= 4th Canadian Folk Music Awards =

2008 music awards ceremony

- Date: November 23, 2008
- Location: Arts and Cultural Centre, St. John's, Newfoundland and Labrador
- Country: Canada
- Hosted by: Shelagh Rogers and Benoit Bourque
- Website: folkawards.ca

The 4th Canadian Folk Music Awards were held on November 23, 2008, at the Arts and Cultural Centre in St. John's, Newfoundland and Labrador.

== Nominees and recipients ==
Recipients are listed first and highlighted in boldface.

Classic Canadian Album	Traditional Album
**Gordon Lightfoot** - **Lightfoot!**; Éritage – La Ronde des Voyageurs; Stan Rogers – Fogarty's Cove; Leonard Cohen – Songs of Leonard Cohen; Kate & Anna McGarrigle – Kate & Anna McGarrigle	**Genticorum** - **La Bibournoise**; Troy MacGillivray & Shane Cook – When Here Meets There; Le Vent du Nord – Dans les airs; Mariam Matossian – In the Light; Yves Lambert & Le Bébert Orchestra – Le Monde à Lambert
Contemporary Album	Children's Album
**Luke Doucet and the White Falcon** - **Blood's Too Rich**; Oliver Schroer - Hymns and Hers; Justin Rutledge – Man Descending; NQ Arbuckle – XOK; Annabelle Chvostek – Resilience	**The Kerplunks** - **The Kerplunks**; Rik Barron – Shine; Celtic Rathskallions – All Around the Circle; Funky Mamas – Rollin' Along; Art Napoleon – Mocikan: Songs for Learning Cree
Traditional Singer	Contemporary Singer
**Enoch Kent** - **One More Round**; Norah Rendell – Wait There Pretty One; Mary Beth Carty - Voici ... Bette et Wallet; Allison Lupton – Fly Like Swallows; Daniel Payne – Chain	**Tannis Slimmon** - **Lucky Blue**; Amos Garrett – Get Way Back: A Tribute to Percy Mayfield; Wyckham Porteous – 3AM; Dave Carroll – Perfect Blue; Rita Chiarelli – Uptown Goes Downtown
Instrumental Solo Artist	Instrumental Group
**Oliver Schroer** - **Hymns and Hers**; Pierre Schryer – Mélange; Sarah Burnell for The Sarah Burnell Band – Return Ticket; Craig Korth – Suspicious Minds; Troy MacGillivray - Live at the Music Room	**Sagapool** - **Episode Trois**; Marc Atkinson Trio – Vol. IV; David Buchbinder's Odessa/Havana – Odessa/Havana; Troy MacGillivray & Shane Cook – When Here Meets There; UCalgary String Quartet - Far Behind I Left My Country
English Songwriter	French Songwriter
**Corb Lund** - **Horse Soldier! Horse Soldier!**; Garnet Rogers – Get a Witness; Tim Hus – Bush Pilot Buckaroo; Wyckham Porteous – 3AM; Lindsay Jane – Lovers Find Reasons	**Tomas Jensen** - **Quelqu'un d'autre**; David Jalbert – Des Histoires; Anique Granger – Pepins; Yves Desrosiers – Chansons indociles; Swing – Tradarnac
Vocal Group	Ensemble
**Sisters of Sheynville** - **Sheynville Express**; The Sojourners – Hold On; Chic Gamine – Chic gamine; Dala – Who Do You Think You Are; Frida's Brow – Frida's Brow	**Yves Lambert et Le Bébert Orchestra** - **Le Monde à Lambert**; Foggy Hogtown Boys – The Golden West; Rita Chiarelli – Uptown Goes Downtown; Le Vent du Nord – Dans les airs; Hungry Hill – Ride
Solo Artist	World Solo Artist
**Michael Jerome Browne** - **Double**; Wyckham Porteous – 3AM; Ken Whiteley - One World Dance; Lindsay Jane – Lovers Find Reasons; Corb Lund - Horse Soldier! Horse Soldier!	**Celso Machado** - **Jogo da Vida**; Musa Dieng Kala – Exile; Ines Canepa – Capricho; Harry Manx – Harry Manx and Friends Live at the Glenn Gould Studio; Eliana Cuevas – Vidas
World Group	New/Emerging Artist
**David Buchbinder's Odessa/Havana** - **Odessa/Havana**; Compadres – Buddy Where You Been?; Marc Atkinson Trio – Vol. IV; Sagapool - Episode Trois; Constantinople et Françoise Atlan – Ay! Amor; Sisters of Sheynville – Sheynville Express	**Chloe Albert** - **Dedicated State**; The Polyjesters – Kitchen Radio; Mariam Matossian – In the Light; Chic Gamine – Chic gamine; David Jalbert - Des Histoires
Producer	Pushing the Boundaries
**Mathieu Dandurand** - **David Jalbert, Des Histoires**; Steve Dawson - Steve Dawson, Waiting for the Lights to Come Up; Erik West-Millette - Bïa Krieger, Nocturno; Oliver Schroer - Oliver Schroer, Hymns and Hers; Othentic - Swing/Tradarnac	**Oliver Schroer** - **Hymns and Hers**; Steve Dawson - Waiting for the Lights to Come Up; Marc Atkinson Trio – Vol. IV; Harry Manx – Harry Manx and Friends Live at the Glenn Gould Studio; Bïa Krieger – Nocturno
Young Performer	
**Emma Beaton** - **Pretty Fair Maid**; Chrissy Crowley – Demo; Kierah – Irish Madness; Drumlin - Mackerel Skies; Paul Cresey - Piece the Picture	
