= 6th Canadian Folk Music Awards =

2010 music awards ceremony

- Date: November 20, 2010
- Location: Pantages Playhouse Theatre Winnipeg, Manitoba
- Country: Canada
- Hosted by: Shelagh Rogers and Benoit Bourque
- Website: folkawards.ca

The 6th Canadian Folk Music Awards were held on November 20, 2010, at the Pantages Playhouse Theatre in Winnipeg, Manitoba.

== Nominees and recipients ==
Recipients are listed first and highlighted in boldface.

Traditional Album	Contemporary Album
**The Once - The Once**; Le Vent du Nord - La Part du Feu; Foggy Hogtown Boys - Scotch and Sofa; David Francey & Mike Ford - Seaway; The Sojourners - The Sojourners	**John Wort Hannam - Queen's Hotel**; Amelia Curran - Hunter, Hunter; Dala - Girls from the North Country; Lennie Gallant - If We Had A Fire / Le coeur hante; Old Man Luedecke - My Hands Are On Fire And Other Love Songs
Children's Album	Traditional Singer
**Andrew Queen - Too Tall**; Kathy Reid-Naiman - Sing The Cold Winter Away; The Kerplunks - Number 3; Madame Diva - Madame Diva; Peter Puffin's Whale Tales - Proud Like A Mountain	**Yves Lambert - Bal à l'Huile**; Emma Beaton and Nic Gareiss - Emma Beaton and Nic Gareiss; Woody Holler and his Orchestra - Western Skies; Rebecca Barclay - Cinnabar; Rik Barron - Never So Far
Contemporary Singer	Instrumental Solo Artist
**Rose Cousins - The Send Off**; James Keelaghan - House of Cards; Justin Rutledge - The Early Widows; Lynn Miles - Black Flowers Volume 1 & 2; Nathan Rogers - The Gauntlet	**Wendell Ferguson - Ménage à Moi**; Brad Keller - House on Fire; Colin Grant - Fun For The Whole Family; Sahra Featherstone - Born of a Summers's Day; Samantha Robichaud - Collected
Instrumental Group	English Songwriter
**Beyond the Pale - Postcards**; Duo Duval-Boulanger - Pièces sur Pièces; Daniel Koulack and Karrnnel - Fiddle and Banjo; Oliver Schroer & Stewed Tomatoes - Freedom Row; Sokoun Trio - Zanneh	**Ian Tamblyn - Gyre**; Amelia Curran - Hunter, Hunter; Lennie Gallant - If We Had A Fire / Le coeur hante; Justin Rutledge - The Early Widows; Chris MacLean - Feet Be Still
French Songwriter	Aboriginal Songwriter
**Francis d'Octobre - Ma bête fragile**; Lennie Gallant - If We Had A Fire / Le coeur hante; David Jalbert - Le Journal; Fredric Gary Comeau - Effeuiller les vertiges; Geneviève Toupin - Geneviève Toupin	**Asani - Listen**; Brenda MacIntyre - Medicine Song; Eagle and Hawk - The Great Unknown; Tom Racine - Three Mile Junction; Wayne Lavallee - Trail of Tears
Vocal Group	Ensemble
**Dala - Girls from the North Country**; The Once - The Once; The Sojourners - The Sojourners; The Marigolds - That's The State I'm In; The Wailin' Jennys - Live at the Mauch Chunk Opera House	**Le Vent du Nord - La Part du Feu**; The Sojourners - The Sojourners; Beyond the Pale - Postcards; Les Tireux d'Roches - Les Tireux d'Roches Cé qu'essé?; Nicolas Pellerin - et les Grands Hurleurs
Solo Artist	World Solo Artist
**Amelia Curran - Hunter, Hunter**; Old Man Luedecke - My Hands Are On Fire And Other Love Songs; Justin Rutledge - The Early Widows; David Myles - Turn Time Off; Matt Andersen - Live From The Phoenix Theatre	**Dominic Mancuso - Comfortably Mine**; Briga - Diaspora; Élage Diouf - Aksil; Jeff Bien - Songs of Forgiveness and Prayer; Jocelyn Pettit - Jocelyn Pettit
World Group	New/Emerging Artist
**Sokoun Trio - Zanneh**; Le Vent du Nord - La Part du Feu; Beyond the Pale - Postcards; Roberto López - Project Soy Panamericano; Apadooraï - Kinda Roots	**The Once - The Once**; Jack Marks - Two of Everything; Jadea Kelly - Eastbound Platform; Jay Aymar - Halfway Home; Peter Katz - First of the Last to know
Producer	Pushing the Boundaries
**Steve Dawson - Various/Things About Comin' My Way**; David Gillis - Arianna Gillis/To Make it Make Sense; Hawksley Workman - Justin Rutledge/The Early Widows; Jory Nash - Jory Nash/New Blue Day; Thom Swift and Charles Austin - Thom Swift/Blue Sky Day	**Beyond the Pale - Postcards**; Daniel Koulack and Karrnnel - Fiddle and Banjo; Oliver Schroer & Stewed Tomatoes - Freedom Row; Mauvais Sort - Droit Devant; Miss Emily Brown - In Technicolor
Young Performer	
**Alexandre Boivin-Caron - La Tradition**; Kierah - A Fiddle Affair; Jocelyn Pettit - Jocelyn Pettit; Lucas Chaisson - No Loitering; Rachel Davis - Rachel Davis	
