= 3rd Canadian Folk Music Awards =

2007 Canadian music awards ceremony

- Date: December 1, 2007
- Location: Canadian Museum of Civilization, Gatineau, Quebec
- Country: Canada
- Hosted by: Shelagh Rogers; Benoit Bourque
- Website: folkawards.ca

The 3rd Canadian Folk Music Awards were held on December 1, 2007, at the Canadian Museum of Civilization in Gatineau, Quebec.

== Nominees and recipients ==
Recipients are listed first and highlighted in boldface.

Traditional Album	Contemporary Album
**La Part du Quêteux - Paye la Traite**; Erynn Marshall & Chris Coole – Meet Me in the Music; Foggy Hogtown Boys – Pigtown Fling; John Reischman & The Jaybirds – Stellar Jays; Les Charbonniers de l'Enfer – À la grâce de Dieu	**The Duhks - Migrations**; Jim Bryson – Where the Bungalows Roam; Oh Susanna – Short Stories; David Francey – Right of Passage; Jenny Whiteley – Dear
Children's Album	Contemporary Singer
**Pied Pumkin - Pumkids: Tuneful Tales for Kids & Kin**; Debbie Carroll – Simply Beautiful; Geneviève Bilodeau & Connie Kaldor – Un Canard à New York; Laura Vinson & Free Spirit – Mossbag Lullaby; Alex Mahé – Wakin' Up the Sunshine	**David Francey - Right of Passage**; Jill Barber – For All Time; Jeremy Fisher – Goodbye Blue Monday; Dawn Tyler Watson – En Duo; T. Nile – At My Table; Bruce Cockburn – Life Short Call Now
Instrumental Solo Artist	Instrumental Group
**Anne Lindsay - News From Up the Street**; Trish Clair-Peck – Dawson's Tumble; Brian Thomas – Prairie Rain; Les Finnigan – Things My Guitar Said; Gordon Quinton – The Yellow Sky	**Creaking Tree String Quartet - The Soundtrack**; Foggy Hogtown Boys – Pigtown Fling; Sultans of String – Luna; Les Chauffeurs à Pieds – Au Studio des Trois Lits; Jaime RT & Andy Hillhouse – Spark
English Songwriter	French Songwriter
**Suzie Ungerleider - Short Stories**; Emm Gryner – The Summer of High Hopes; David Francey – Right of Passage; Bruce Cockburn – Life Short Call Now; Jon Brooks – Ours and the Shepherds; Keri Latimer, Shelley Marshall (Nathan) – Key Principles	**Hugo Fleury of Polémil Bazar - Avale ta montre**; Sylvie Jean – Déjouer le vent; Guillaume Monette, Guillaume Meloche-Charlebois, Nicola Morel of 3 Gars Su'L'Sofa – Des Cobras, des Tarentules; Guillaume Arsenault – Le rang des Îles; Michel Marchildon - Fragments d'Identité
Aboriginal Songwriter	Vocal Group
**Sandy Scofield - Nikawiy Askiy**; Leela Gilday – Sedzé; Ry Moran – Groundwater; Laura Vinson – Mossbag Lullaby; Karen Donaldson Shepherd of The Crow Girls – Where the Green Grass Grows	**Tanglefoot - Dance Like Flames**; Nathan – Key Principles; The Be Good Tanyas – Hello Love; Blackie and the Rodeo Kings – Let's Frolic; Sirens – Look Up
Ensemble	Solo Artist
**Les Charbonniers de l'enfer - À la grâce de Dieu**; Creaking Tree String Quartet - The Soundtrack; The Duhks – Migrations; John Reichman & The Jaybirds – Stellar Jays; Harry Manx & Kevin Breit – In Good We Trust	**Sarah Noni Metzner - Daybreak Mourning**; Jeremy Fisher – Goodbye Blue Monday; Rose Cousins – If You Were For Me; Ian Tamblyn – Superior : Spirit and Light; Bruce Cockburn – Life Short Call Now
World Solo Artist	World Group
**Rita Chiarelli - Cuore : The Italian Sessions**; Duane Andrews – Crocus; Kiran Ahluwalia – Wanderlust; Alex Cuba – Agua del Pozo; Sara Renelik – Aube	**Mighty Popo - Muhazi**; Kobo Town – Independence; Labess – Tout Va Bien; Autorickshaw – So the Journey Goes; Les Gitans de Sarajevo – Opa!
New/Emerging Artist	Producer
**Brigitte Saint-Aubin - Être**; The Gruff – The Gruff; Kim Beggs – Wanderer's Paean; Jacob & Lily – The Cathedral; Notre Dame de Grass – New Canada Road	**Anne Lindsay and Oliver Schroer - News From Up the Street (Anne Lindsay)**; Joby Baker, Alexis Puentes - Agua del Pozo (Alex Cuba); Colin Linden – Let's Frolic (Blackie and the Rodeo Kings); Lewis Melville – Lucky Blue (Tannis Slimmon); Jonathan Goldsmith – Life Short Call Now (Bruce Cockburn)
Pushing the Boundaries	Young Performer
**Creaking Tree String Quartet - The Soundtrack**; Harry Manx & Kevin Breit – In Good We Trust; Joey Wright – Jalopy; The Fugitives – In Streetlight Communion; Autorickshaw – So the Journey Goes	**Kyrie Kristmanson - The Kyrie K Groove**; The Vissia Sisters – Chrysalis; Chrissy Crowley – Chrissy Crowley; Nerea – Footprints; John Fettes – Poor Art for Poor People
