= Things as They Are? =

1992 short story collection by Guy Vanderhaeghe

First edition

Things As They Are? is a short story collection by Guy Vanderhaeghe, published in 1992 by McClelland and Stewart. Like his previous short story collections, Man Descending and The Trouble With Heroes, Things As They Are? deals with themes of masculinity and small-town life in Saskatchewan.
