= Southern Souls =

Canadian music website

Southern Souls is a Canadian music website which features high-definition video recordings of musicians (predominantly but not exclusively Canadian) performing live in non-traditional venues.

The website was launched in 2009 by Mitch Fillion, a filmmaker from Hamilton, with 20 videos he had originally shot with the goal of putting together a documentary film on Hamilton musicians. The site now features over 800 video performances, by artists including Dan Mangan, Alex Cuba, New Country Rehab, David Myles, Whitehorse, Daniel Romano, Gentleman Reg, Aidan Knight, The Luyas, Peter Katz, Emma-Lee, Kae Sun, Justin Rutledge, Two Hours Traffic, Hilotrons, Ron Sexsmith, Martha Wainwright, The Zolas, Old Man Luedecke, Amelia Curran, Skydiggers, Lily Frost, Danny Michel, Bahamas, Tim Chaisson, Cuff the Duke, Jenn Grant and Wax Mannequin. The site also distributed MP3 recordings of a live performance by Jeff Mangum at Toronto's Trinity-St. Paul's United Church in 2011.

In 2011, the site placed second behind Weird Canada in CBC Radio 3's Searchlight competition to name Canada's best music website.

Filion has described the site's style as influenced by the Dogme 95 movement, with all videos filmed with a handheld camera, on location with no props and no special lighting.
