= Ash & Bloom =

Canadian folk pop band

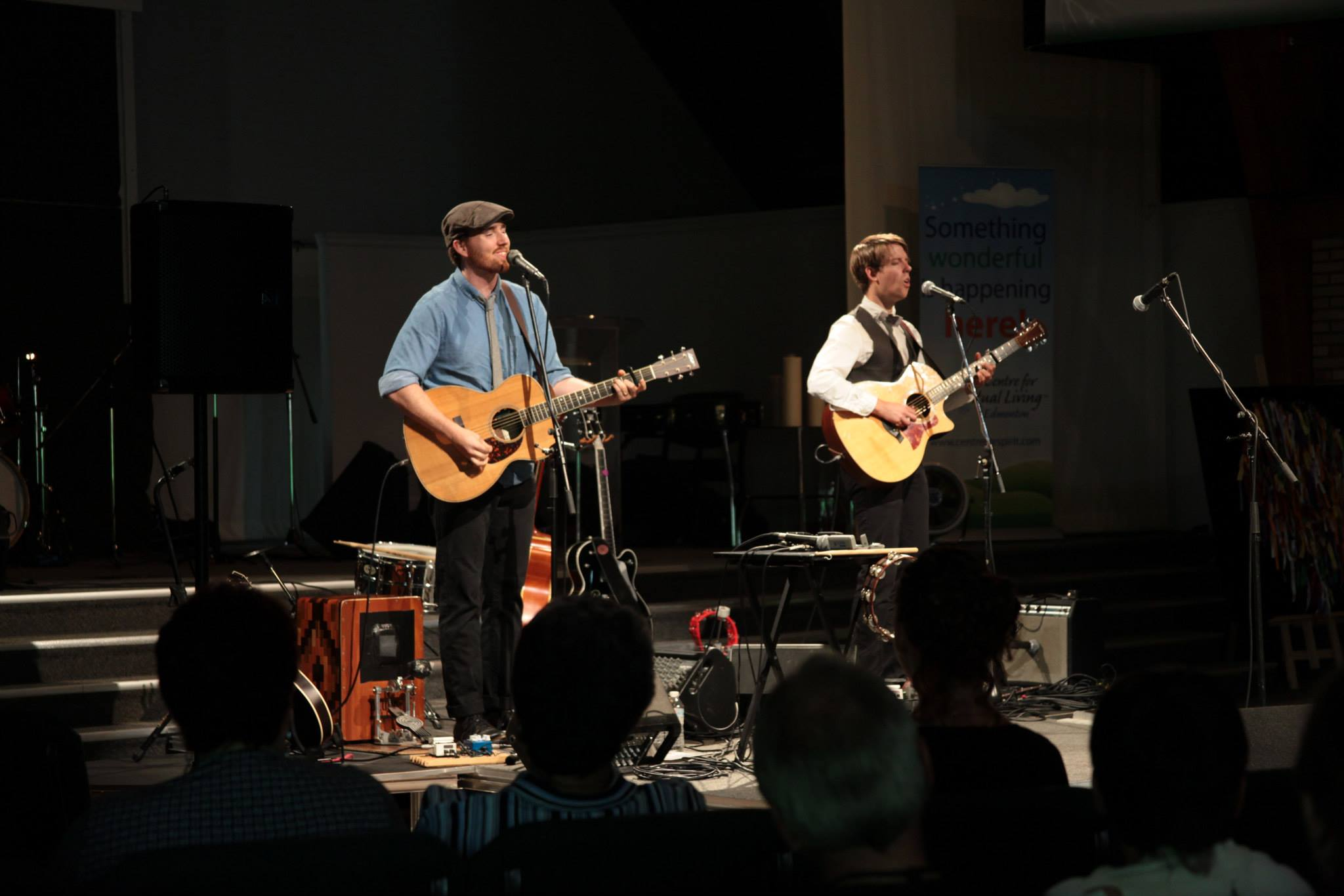

Background information
- Origin: Hamilton, Ontario, Canada
- Genres: folk pop
- Years active: 2013–2015
- Labels: Orange Lounge Recordings, JAD Media
- Spinoff of: Garner
- Members: James Bloemendal; Matt McKenna

Ash & Bloom was a Canadian folk pop duo, from Hamilton, Ontario, consisting of James Bloemendal (vocals, acoustic and electric guitar, percussion) and Matt McKenna (vocals, acoustic guitar, mandolin, percussion).

== History ==
While attending Redeemer University College, McKenna and Bloemendal met in the choir, then joined with other local musicians to form the band Garner. In early 2013, after parting ways with Garner, Ash & Bloom played a show in Port Perry, alongside singer-songwriter Stacey Kaniuk, a longtime friend of singer (and Order of Ontario recipient) Justin Hines. Hines attended the show and asked the duo to join him on his North American "Vehicle of Change Tour". From June to October 2013, Ash & Bloom traveled with Hines across North America. Following the tour, the duo signed with Toronto label Orange Lounge Recordings and JAD Media.

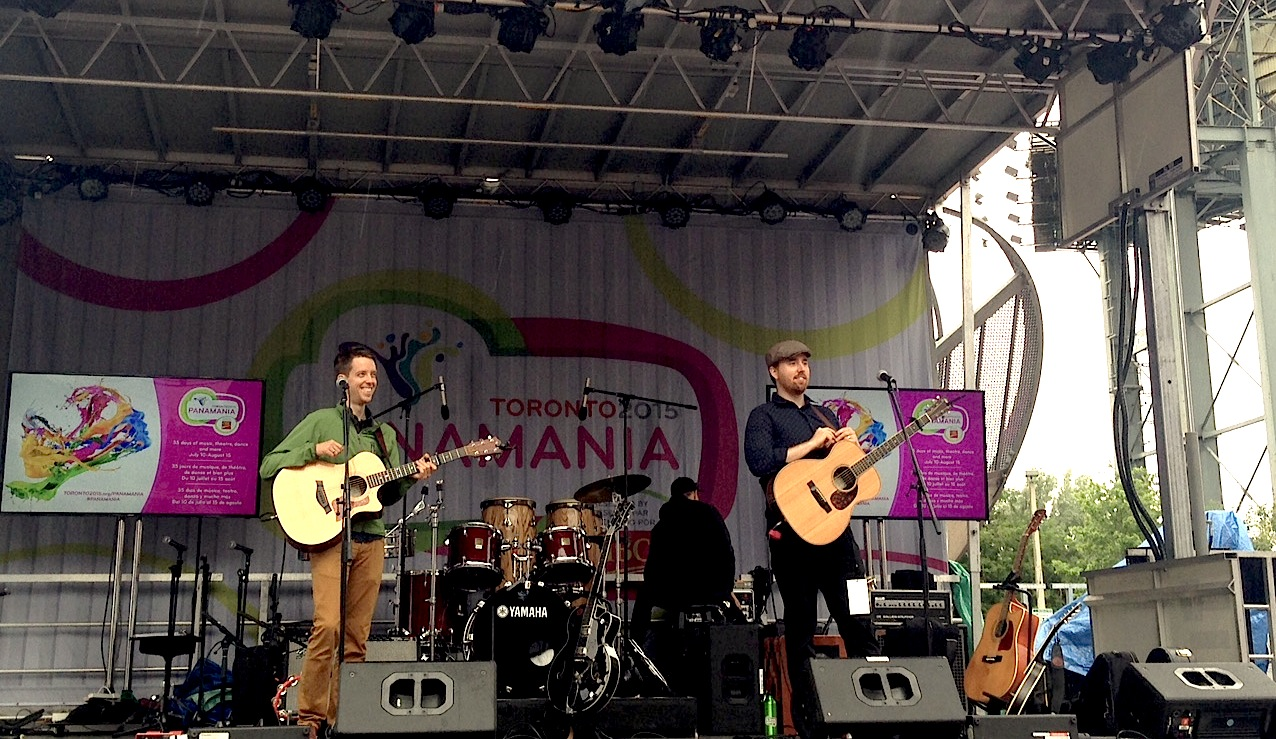
Ash & Bloom Performing at Panamania Toronto 2015

== Ash & Bloom EP ==
Ash & Bloom's self-titled EP was released November 2013, which featured 4 tracks written by McKenna and Bloemendal with Julie Crochetière and Karen Kosowski. An animated music video for the song "Heaven Is A Ghost Town" was released the same month. The video was cited as being controversial for depicting Bono, Oprah, Gandhi and Ellen DeGeneres not making it into heaven. The video received mixed reviews from press.

== Let The Storm Come ==
On June 24, 2014, Ash & Bloom's released their debut studio album Let The Storm Come, featuring songs co-written by Peter Katz, Caroline Brooks (The Good Lovelies), Julie Crochetière and Rob Szabo. The album debuted at No. 10 on the iTunes Singer-Songwriter charts and received praise for its songwriting and production. The day after the album's release, the duo exclusively shared the video for "Your Hero" through Exclaim! magazine. CBCMusic featured the song "Manna for My Soul" as their Song of the Week. Also in 2014, Ash & Bloom appeared with Basia Bulat, and The Wooden Sky, and opened for Christopher Cross at the Canadian National Exhibition.

At the 2015 Hamilton Music Awards, Let The Storm Come was nominated for Folk/Traditional Recording of the Year and Ash & Bloom was nominated for New Artist/Group of the Year.

Let The Storm Come was released in Australia and New Zealand on February 6, 2015 through MGM Distribution. Following the release, Ash & Bloom toured Australia, where they performed at the Port Fairy Folk Festival, then toured Canada, and performed at the Mariposa Folk Festival.

== "This Town (Hamilton)" ==
During the 2015 JUNO Award week, which took place in Hamilton, Ash & Bloom released a video for their song "This Town (Hamilton)". The video featured prominent Hamilton residents or natives, such as Melissa McClelland, Janine Stoll and Lisa Winn from Ladybird Sideshow, Boris Brott, Brandon Bliss from Monster Truck, Peter Dyakowski from the Hamilton Tiger Cats, Mayor Fred Eisenberger as well as cast/crew from CHCH, K-Lite, CHML and writers from The Spectator and Hamilton Magazine. As one of Hamilton's own, Ash & Bloom performed at JUNOfest 2015.

== The Spark ==
In the summer of 2015, Ash & Bloom were in the middle of a tour promoting their six-track EP The Spark, when they decided to part ways. The remainder of the tour was cancelled and although The Spark was released in August 2016, it was not highly publicized.

== Discography ==
- Ash & Bloom (EP) (2013), JAD Media
- Let the Storm Come (2014), JAD Media
- The Spark (EP) (2016), JAD Media

== Additional Singles ==
- River (Live) JAD Media
