= Stranded in Suburbia =

Studio album by Melissa McClelland
- Released: 2004
- Genre: Pop-Noir
- Length: 54:54
- Label: Orange, Universal
- Producer: Luke Doucet

Melissa McClelland chronology
Melissa McClelland (2001)	Stranded in Suburbia (2004)	Thumbelina's One Night Stand (2006)

Stranded in Suburbia is Melissa McClelland's second album. The album was released in 2004 in Canada by the Orange Record Label.

== Track listing ==
1. "Good as Gold" (4:55)
2. "White Lies (Stranded in Suburbia)" (2:49)
3. "Pretty Blue" (4:47)
4. "Jaded" (3:51)
5. "Glimpse into Hell" (3:18)
6. "Rooftop" (5:11)
7. "Factory" (2:39)
8. "Picture Postcard" (3:39)
9. "Encinitas Rainstorm" (4:41)
10. "Little Birds" (4:26)
11. "Blue Farewell" (5:55)
12. "Smoke Signals" (4:45)
13. "Jaded [Ogilve/Fu Remix]" (4:00)

The CD contains enhanced CD content including interview clips, live performance footage, a video clip of "White Lies" and more.

All songs written by Melissa McClelland except:

- "Encinitas Rainstorm" and "Jaded", co-written by Luke Doucet
- "Factory" written by Bruce Springsteen
