= Marie Lannoo =

Canadian artist (born 1954)

- Born: 1954 (age 71–72); Simcoe, Ontario, Canada
- Education: University of Saskatchewan; Banff School of Fine Arts
- Known for: Painter, graphic artist
- Website: http://www.marielannoo.com/

Marie Lannoo (born 1954) is a Canadian artist. Lannoo was born in Simcoe, Ontario in 1954 but raised in Delhi, Ontario. Lannoo moved to Saskatchewan in 1975 and does her work primarily in Saskatoon. Lannoo is known for her abstract paintings. Her current abstract work uses layered colours and the illusion of depth.

== Education ==
In 1978 Lannoo got her Bachelor of Arts Honours and a year later her degree in Fine Arts from the University of Saskatchewan. In 1980, Lannoo studied painting in Virton, Belgium, and attended the Banff School of Fine Arts. Lannoo participated in the Emma Lake Artists' Workshops in 1981, 1983, 1984 and 2000.

Lannoo received the Department of Culture and Youth Multicultural Bursary in 1979, the G. B. Poole Scholarship in 1980 and from 1980 to 1984 she received grants from the Saskatchewan Arts Board.

== Career ==
In The Academy from the fall of 1990 she delved into her personal recollections. The Academy contained figurative paintings which were tied together by narrative. These pieces deal with Marie Lannoo's stay at a convent school. They do not focus on the story of a girl going to convent school but rather are Lannoo's recollections of her time at the school. Her recollections are tied to each other, as Cindy Richmond wrote, "in a narrative form by the painter's specific reactions to those recollections." The Academy was the first time she used herself as her subject. "Her close attention to the evocative power of colour and texture, allow the viewer more than one perspective from which to approach the work," Cindy Richmond, the curator for The Academy, acknowledged.

In Imprints Lannoo dealt with imprinting in its metaphorical implications and also, as Tim Nowlin wrote, "within the material realization of her paintings." These works deal with layering information on the canvas. The paintings are dense and complex; using stenciling, pouring, scraping and brushing paint. They are, as Tim Nowlin has put it, "like palimpsests, surfaces where information is layered upon prior information, both rubbing out and exposing traces of meaning."

Her main subject matter is reflected colour which shows in her Mendel Art Gallery exhibition, Through and Through and Through. In this exhibition she used Transparent and luminescent material. Roald Nasgaard has written that, "Increasingly her work has disembodied colour, casting it out into space as pure spectral display." This show was an experience and not simply something to be viewed. As Vincent Varga wrote, "It allows the viewer to get inside the dynamic colours."

Her interest in form and optical effects of colour and surface is particularly evident in her exhibition with Margaret Elizabeth Vanderhaeghe, The Source of Things. Dan Ring, the curator, for The Source of Things, explains Lannoo's recent work uses abstract language to show both, "the embodied and the disembodied, forming meaning out of pattern and repetition, alluding to both the world we live in and to a history of abstraction." In the early 2000s Marie Lannoo was an artist mentor at the Saskatoon Mendel Art Gallery.

Her work is currently in many public collections including Canada Council Art Bank, Government of Alberta, Saskatchewan Arts Board, SaskTel and the University of Saskatchewan. She exhibits locally, nationally and internationally and is represented by Galerie de Bellefeuille in Montreal, Newzones Gallery of Contemporary Art in Calgary, Alberta and Galerie Lausberg in Toronto.

== Exhibitions ==
=== Solo exhibitions ===
- 1990 - The Academy
- 1997 - Imprints
- 1997 - Seeking Identity
- 1997 - Merger
- 1999 - Ricochet
- 2001 - Recent Work
- 2001 - Talking in Circles
- 2001 - Immersed
- 2010 - Through and Through and Through

=== Selected group exhibitions ===
- 1980 - Saskatchewan Open
- 1982 - Emma Lake Now
- 1983 - Emerging Saskatchewan Artists
- 1985 - The Second Generation: Fourteen Saskatchewan Painters
- 1987 - Saskatchewan Art, Tradition and Diversity
- 1988 - Talking Through Time
- 1993 - Recent Acquisitions
- 1994 - Recent Acquisitions
- 1995 - Pictures For Words
- 1996 - All About Colour
