= Valleyheart (Justin Rutledge album) =

Studio album by Justin Rutledge
- Released: February 12, 2013
- Genre: Alternative country
- Label: Outside Music
- Producer: Justin Rutledge

Justin Rutledge chronology
The Early Widows (2010)	Valleyheart (2013)	Daredevil (2014)

Valleyheart is the fifth studio album by Canadian singer-songwriter Justin Rutledge, released February 12, 2013 on Outside Music.

Rutledge has described the album as having been inspired by the process of remastering and rereleasing his debut album, 2004's No Never Alone, in 2012. During the process, he decided to make a new album that revisited the themes and creative inspirations of No Never Alone, this time from his contemporary perspective as an older, more mature adult, and a more experienced musician, revisiting his life at the time of the original album via memory. To that end, the album includes two songs, "Kapuskasing Coffee" and "Heather in the Pines", which he began writing around the time of the original album, but set aside and never finished until the recording sessions for Valleyheart; he has described the two songs as "co-writes with my younger self and older self", and the full album as "a response to that young kid who just wrote what he felt".

British singer-songwriter Carina Round provides backing vocals on several songs.

The iTunes edition of the album includes three exclusive bonus tracks, cover versions of Bob Dylan's "Tomorrow Is a Long Time", Ewan MacColl's "Dirty Old Town" and The Tragically Hip's "Nautical Disaster". Around the time of the album's release, Rutledge also recorded a performance video of "Nautical Disaster" for the website Southern Souls. In 2014, Rutledge released Spring Is a Girl, an EP which collected these three tracks along with a cover of the Tragically Hip's "Bobcaygeon" which was recorded for but not included on his 2014 album Daredevil, for sale on the Canadian web label Zunior.

The album won the Juno Award for Roots & Traditional Album of the Year – Solo at the Juno Awards of 2014.

== Track listing ==
1. "Amen America"
2. "Four Lean Hounds"
3. "Getting Away"
4. "Out of the Woods"
5. "Travel Light"
6. "Kapuskasing Coffee"
7. "Through with You"
8. "Downtown"
9. "Intro"
10. "Heather in the Pines"
11. "Tomorrow Is a Long Time" (iTunes Bonus Track)
12. "Dirty Old Town" (iTunes Bonus Track)
13. "Nautical Disaster" (iTunes Bonus Track)
