= Passages (Justin Rutledge album) =

Studio album by Justin Rutledge
- Released: May 31, 2019
- Recorded: 2018
- Studio: Union Sound
- Genre: Alternative country
- Label: Outside Music
- Producer: Chris Stringer, Justin Rutledge

Justin Rutledge chronology
East (2016)	Passages (2019)	Islands (2021)

Passages is the eighth studio album by Canadian singer-songwriter Justin Rutledge, released on May 31, 2019.

Rutledge has acknowledged that while he usually writes songs from a fictional perspective rather than writing about his own life, the album's title track is a love song to his wife, designer and HGTV host Sarah Keenleyside, whom he married in 2018. The album features a songwriting collaboration with novelist Michael Ondaatje, with whom he first collaborated on his 2010 album The Early Widows, on the song "Boats", and includes guitar contributions by former Tragically Hip guitarist Rob Baker.

"Good Man" was released in March as the album's first preview single.

== Track listing ==
1. "Captive"
2. "Allisonville"
3. "Passages"
4. "Good Man"
5. "Not Enough"
6. "One Winter's Day"
7. "Weight of the World"
8. "Belleville Breakup"
9. "Chains"
10. "Boats"
