= Tannis =

Tannis may refer to:

- Tannis Slimmon, a Canadian musician
- Tannis Vallely, an American former child actress
