= West Point Grey Academy =

Private school in Vancouver, British Columbia

Location
- 4125 West 8th Avenue; Vancouver, British Columbia, V6R 4P9; Canada; 49°15′59.6″N 123°12′1.2″W

Information
- School type: Independent, Co-ed, Day
- Motto: "Progredimini Confidenter" (Go Forth with Confidence)
- Founded: 1996
- Head of School: Stephen Anthony
- Grades: JK-12
- Enrollment: 940
- Language: English
- Colours: Uniform: Dark green, navy blue, black, white
- Team name: Wolves
- Yearbook: The View
- Website: wpga.ca

West Point Grey Academy is an independent, co-educational, day school founded in 1996 located in Vancouver, British Columbia, Canada. It delivers the British Columbia Ministry of Education curriculum from Junior-Kindergarten to Grade 12.

== History ==
West Point Grey Academy was founded in 1996 by Andrew Chan, Peter Wong, Michael Choi, and Clifford Mirikitani.

== Notable staff ==
- Justin Trudeau, Prime Minister of Canada; taught math, humanities, social studies, French and drama at the school from 1999 to the summer of 2001. Trudeau was photographed in black-face during his time as a teacher at WPGA.
- Mariam Matossian, Armenian folk music singer.

== Athletics ==
All students from Junior-Kindergarten to Grade 12 are enrolled in Physical Education classes. The WPGA campus features a gymnasium, pool, fitness centre, two outdoor tennis courts, multi-sport fields, and a 1.5 km outdoor running/walking trail. Main sports include soccer, basketball, volleyball, cross-country, swimming, track and field, golf, and tennis.

WPGA fields a variety of athletic teams from grade 5 through grade 12 competing as members of the Canadian Association of Independent Schools. School teams also compete in local city and independent school leagues and are also registered in the 'A' and 'AA' divisions of the BC School Sports Provincial Championships.

WPGA won their first high school provincial championship banner in fall 2010 with their varsity girls cross-country team capturing the 'AAA' BC High-School Cross-Country Championships title. The varsity girls cross-country team brought home their second consecutive banner after successfully defending their title on November 5, 2011.

== Film and performing arts ==
West Point Grey Academy's Fine and Performing Arts faculty is hosted in a dedicated Arts Wing (made up of several visual arts studios, a ceramics room, band room, drama room, choir room, recording studio, and wood-shop).

Since 1997 the school's drama program has annually produced a large scale production with ticket sales open to the Greater Vancouver community. In 2005, the school produced its first musical, The Sound of Music, and has since strived to produce a musical every other year. In 2007 it put on The Wizard of Oz at the Richmond Gateway Theatre. The department put on Jane Austen's Pride and Prejudice as adapted for the stage in 2009 with a production of Anne of Green Gables in 2010. In 2014, WPGA produced the musical, Grease. Their production in 2017 was Auntie Mame. In 2018, it was "Into The Woods." In 2020, it was "The 25th Annual Putnam Country Spelling Bee."

The school's band and strings programs are quickly growing, regularly performing in the community. In April 2007 the school's concert band and choirs undertook their first international band trip to Disneyland in Anaheim, California. They've been going to numerous festivals and competitions every year including Kiwanis and Con Brio.

Every May the school hosts a week-long celebration of the arts called Arts Week. During this week, classes are shortened to allow for artistic workshops and guest artists to give presentations. The evenings also feature large scale musical productions, including Coffee House Night, Mic-Night, and Cabaret Night.

== Community service ==
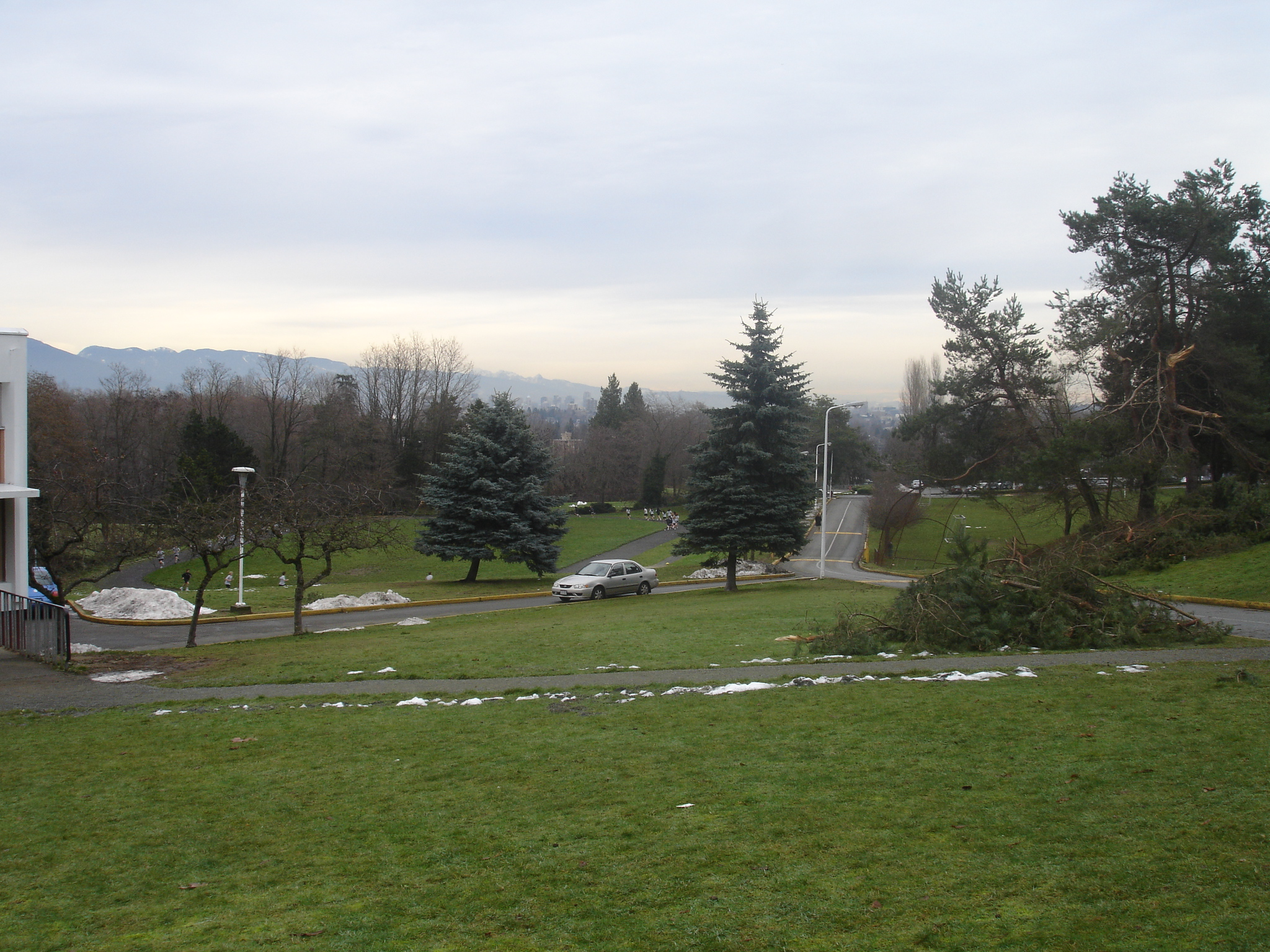
The West Point Grey Academy campus

The school and its student body continually stress the importance of community stewardship. The school hosts groups which regularly volunteer at the Union Gospel Mission as well as other local community based initiatives. In March 2006, six students and two teachers joined a Canadian team to travel to Tanzania to summit Mount Kilimanjaro in order to raise funds for the Stephen Lewis Foundation. They worked to generate HIV/AIDS Awareness in schools around the Lower Mainland, and succeeded in raising over $40,000 for charity. West Point Grey Academy was also responsible for reinstating the Vancouver Independent Schools' Charity Ball in February 2005, and in July 2007 successfully completed a school-building service trip to Ecuador. During the 2006-2007 school year, a number of WPGA students collaborated to plan, organize, and run Urban Aid, a benefit concert to raise money for Covenant House Vancouver. The concert showcased a number of Vancouver independent groups and artists, and was attended by over 300 high school students from around the Lower Mainland. The event raised over $5,000 for charity.

== Debate and public speaking ==
WPGA's senior school competitive debate team is one of the most decorated teams on the national circuit. As the current home of the 2015 Canadian national champions, WPGA has won the national title more times than any other school. WPGA debaters have also qualified as one of two Canadian teams at the Oxford Finals (U.K. championships) five times in the past seven years, and six national debate squad teams, which represent Canada at the World Schools Debate Championships, have included WPGA students.

The school's Model UN team has competed at a number of international competitions including the National High School MUN (New York), Harvard Model UN (Cambridge), SSUNS McGill, and Harvard Model Congress in Athens, Greece and Brussels, Belgium. In addition to receiving a number of delegate awards, the team has also received notable acclamation as the Top International Delegation at the Harvard Model United Nations in both 2005 and 2006 and McGill's SSUNS in 2008. The school's Model UN program hosts its own conference, the Vancouver Youth Model United Nations (VYMUN) every October.
