= Matossian =

Matossian may refer to:

- 22776 Matossian, a minor planet

== People with the surname ==
- Alexander Matossian, Lebanese politician
- Mariam Matossian, Canadian musician
- Mary Kilbourne Matossian (1930–2023), American historian
- Nouritza Matossian (born 1945), British Cypriot writer, actress, broadcaster and human rights activist
- Matossian family, tobacco merchants established in Belgium; see Armenians in Belgium
