= Vira Lozinsky =

Israeli musical artist

Vira Lozinsky וירה לוזינסקי
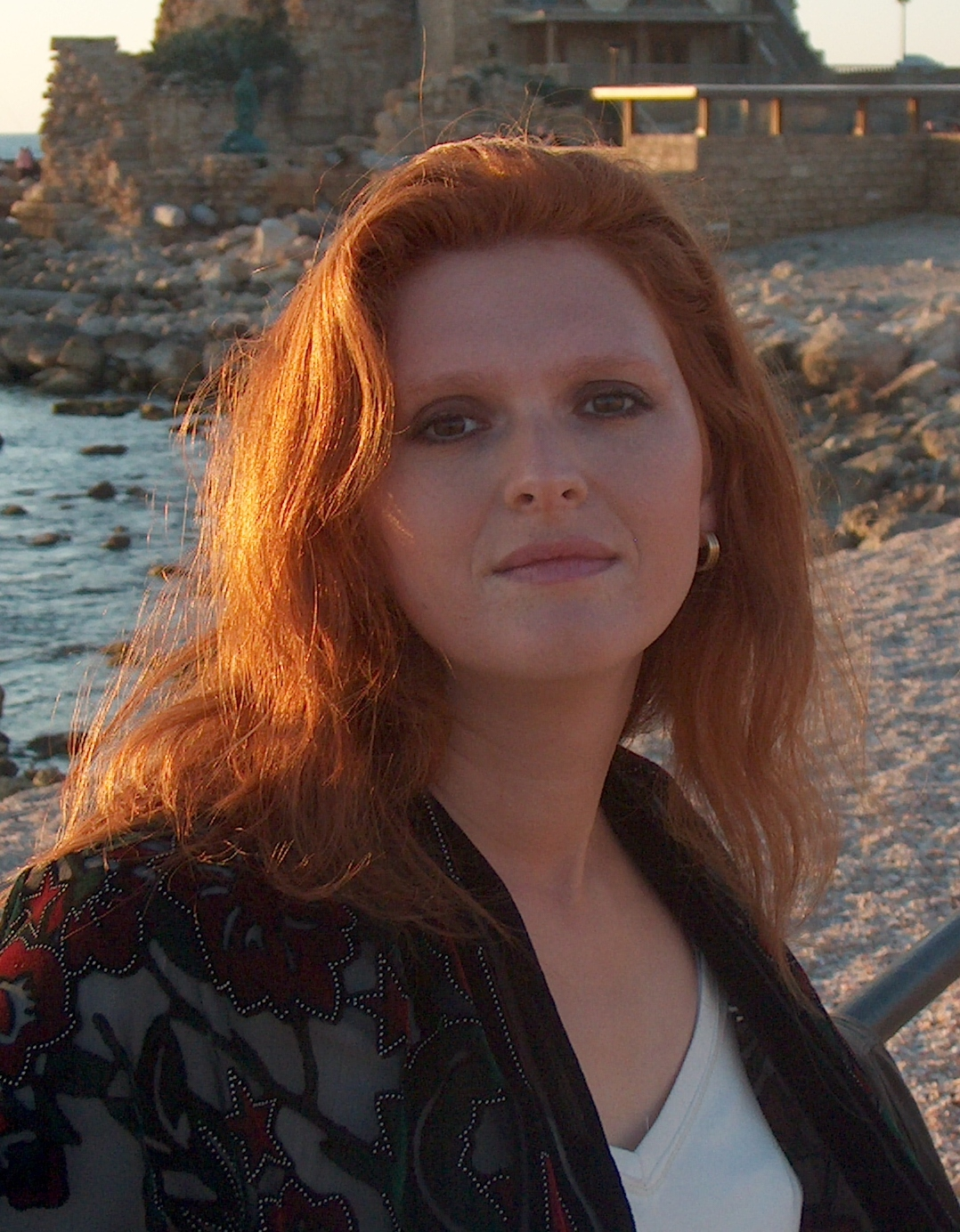
- Lozinsky in Caesarea in 2012

Background information
- Born: 1974 (age 50–51); Bălți, Moldavian SSR, USSR
- Origin: Israel
- Genres: Folk; world
- Occupation: Singer
- Instrument: Vocals
- Years active: 2005–present
- Website: viralozinsky.com

Vira Lozinsky (Hebrew: וירה לוזינסקי; born 1974) is an Israeli-Moldovan musician and Yiddish language singer.

== Biography ==
Vira Lozinsky was born in 1974 in Bălți, Moldova (Bessarabia) to a family of Jewish artists. As a child, Vira studied music and played the violin at the city music school. She participated in the local Yiddish theater led by her father Mikhoel Felsenbaum. She was exposed at an early age to the cultures and musical styles of the many ethnic groups living in Moldova: Moldovans, Romanians, Jews, Roma, Russians and others. Her repertoire includes new material written mainly by her father, Mikhoel Felsenbaum, as well as classical Yiddish folk songs, Romanian folk songs translated to Yiddish, songs of classical and modern Yiddish poets. After immigrating to Israel at age 16, she pursued Yiddish and Musicology studies in Bar Ilan University, and vocal studies in the Rimon School of Jazz and Contemporary Music in Ramat HaSharon. For several years was a student of Nechama Lifshitz's Yiddish song workshop.

Vira Lozinsky has toured several countries and participated in klezmer events in Israel, Europe, and the Americas.

== Discography ==
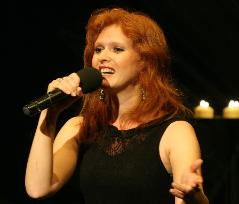
Vira Lozinsky performs at the Festival of Jewish Culture in Warsaw, September 6, 2007.

=== Album ===
- Wunderweg (Wondrous Way) (2011)
- Vayte Shtern (Distant Stars) (2007)

=== Participation ===
- A Jewish Celebration , (Putumayo World Music, 2012)
- Postcards (Beyond the Pale, 2009) (winner of two Canadian Folk Music Awards for 2010

== Awards ==
- Grand Prize: International Jewish Music Competition in Amsterdam – 2012

- Mira Rafalowicz Prize (best Yiddish): International Jewish Music Competition in Amsterdam – 2012
- Independent Music Awards nominee 2012 World Traditional album category

- Just Plain Folks Music Awards 2009 winner – for the song Malokhim Lid
- Vira Lozinsky has been nominated for the 7th Annual Independent Music Awards / Best World Music album (2008) World Music Central
- Nester Mayner composed by Yuri Povolotsky, with the lyrics by Michael Felsenbaum won the Jury Prize at the 2022 Bubbe Awards for "Best New Original Yiddish Song"

== Musical Reviews ==
- Review by Keith Wolzinger
