= Man Descending (album) =

Studio album by Justin Rutledge
- Released: April 8, 2008
- Genre: Alternative country
- Label: Six Shooter Records

Justin Rutledge chronology
The Devil on a Bench in Stanley Park (2006)	Man Descending (2008)	The Early Widows (2010)

Man Descending is the third album by Canadian singer-songwriter Justin Rutledge, released April 8, 2008 on Six Shooter Records.

Rutledge has stated to CBC Radio 3 that the album is titled for, and to an extent thematically inspired by, Guy Vanderhaeghe's short story collection Man Descending.

== Track listing ==
All tracks are written by Justin Rutledge

No.	Title	Length
1.	"St. Peter"	3:36
2.	"The Wire"	5:47
3.	"A Penny for the Band"	5:27
4.	"This Too Shall Pass"	4:04
5.	"Greenwich Time"	4:31
6.	"San Sebastian"	3:46
7.	"Waterloo"	3:56
8.	"Everyone's in Love"	4:28
9.	"Honey Houses"	2:51
10.	"Alberta Breeze"	6:09
