= Mikhoel Felsenbaum =

Mikhoel Felzenbaum (Yiddish: מיכאל פֿעלזענבאַום, Russian: Михо́эл Фельзенба́ум; born 1951 in Vasylkiv, Ukraine, USSR) is a postmodernist Yiddish novelist, poet and playwright.

He grew up in the Bessarabian city of Florești. He studied stage directing, theatre and art history in Leningrad and, from 1969 to 1973, worked as a director in the national theater of Bălți. In the mid-1980s, he began to publish his work in the Yiddish journal Sovetish Heymland. In 1988, he founded the Jewish theater of Bălți, for which he directed a number of plays in Yiddish. He was first chairman of the city's Jewish cultural society. His plays have been discussed in a conference in Alsace

After immigrating to Israel in 1991, Felsenbaum published several volumes of poetry and prose in Yiddish, and was co-founder of the almanac, Naye Vegn. He has had work published in various Yiddish journals: Di Goldene Keyt and ToplPunkt (Israel), Di Pen (Oxford), Oyfn Shvel and Yidishe Kultur (New York). His novel, Shabesdike Shvebelekh, is one of the only postmodern works written in Yiddish, and is about to be translated into Hebrew, English, German, Russian and French. It was discussed at a conference in Oxford

Mikhoel Felzenbaum has programmes on the weekly Yiddish language series broadcast on the Reka radio station based in Israel.

Mikhoel Felzenbaum is the father of the singer Vira Lozinsky.

== Awards ==
A lifetime achievement award from the National Authority for Yiddish Culture for 2024

== Bibliography ==
- עס קומט דער טאָג (Es kumt der tog: lider; Day arrives: Poems). Jerusalem; Tel-Aviv: Šmuel un Riwke Hurwitz Literatur-Fond, 1992.
- אַ ליבע-רעגן (A libe regn: lider; Rain of love: Poems). Tel Aviv: I. L. Peretz Farlag, 1995.
- דער נאַכט-מלאך (Der nakht-malekh; Angel of the night). Short stories and plays. Tel Aviv: I. L. Peretz Farlag, 1997.
- און איצט איך בין דײַן ניגון (Un itst ikh bin dayn nign; And now I am your melody). Poems. Bilingual edition in Yiddish and in Hebrew translation. Tel Aviv: H. Leyvik Farlag, 1998.
- Jiddische Texte: Solothurner Literaturtage, 10-12 Mai 2002. Conversation among Michael Felsenbaum, Lev Berinsky, and Gennady Estraikh. Edited and with an introduction ("Einführung zur Jiddischen Literatur") by Astrid Starck. Solothurn: Solothurner Literaturtage, 2002. In Yiddish and German. ISBN 9783952000465.
- שבתדיקע שװעבעלעך (Shabesdike shṿebelekh: roman; Sabbath matches: Novel). Tel Aviv: H. Leyvik Farlag, 2004.
- אין דרעזדען בײַ דער לאַבע (In Drezden, bay der Labe =Dresden an der Labe; In Dresden on the Elbe). Poems. Bilingual edition in Yiddish and in German translation. Tel Aviv: Menora Verlag, 2006.
- Субботние спички (роман, перевёл с идиша Вэлвл Чернин), РИЦ Медиа Формат: Moscow, 2006.
- בענקשאַפֿט (Benkshaft; Longing). Poems. Tel Aviv: Menora Verlag, 2007.
