= Victoria Day (album) =

Studio album by Melissa McClelland
- Released: 2009
- Genre: Americana, Canadiana, pop rock
- Label: Six Shooter Records
- Producer: Luke Doucet

Melissa McClelland chronology
Thumbelina's One Night Stand (2006)	Victoria Day (2009)

Victoria Day is Melissa McClelland's fourth album. The album was released in 2009 in Canada by Six Shooter Records.

== Track listing ==
All songs written by Melissa McClelland, except "A Girls Can Dream" written by Luke Doucet & Melissa McClelland and "Money Shot" written by JD Ormond.

1. "A Girl Can Dream"
2. "Glenrio"
3. "Segovia"
4. "God Loves Me"
5. "Victoria Day (April Showers)"
6. "Victoria Day (May Flowers)"
7. "I Blame You"
8. "Cry On My Shoulder"
9. "When The Lights Went Off In Hogtown"
10. "Seasoned Lovers"
11. "Brake"
12. "Money Shot"

== Personnel ==
- Melissa McClelland – vocals, backup vocals, acoustic guitar, piano on "Segovia"
- Luke Doucet – electric and acoustic guitars, Rhodes piano, lap steel, banjo, piano on "Brake", background vocals
- Rich Levesque – upright bass, electric bass guitar, background vocals
- Al Cross – drums and percussion on tracks #2, 3, 4, 5, 6 and 9
- Glen Milchem – drums on tracks #, 10, 11 and 12
- Barry Mirochnick – drums on tracks #7 and 8
- Horns – Jim Bish on saxophone, Bryden Baird on trumpet, William Carn on trombone
- Steve O'Connor – piano on "A Girl Can Dream" and B3 organ on "God Loves Me"
- Ron Sexsmith – vocals on "Seasoned Lovers"
- David Travers-Smith – horns and vibes on "Seasoned Lovers"
- Kevin Fox – string arrangements, cello
- Karen Graves – violin
- Kathryn Sugden – violin
- Johann Lotter – viola
