= Daredevil (Justin Rutledge album) =

Studio album by Justin Rutledge
- Released: April 22, 2014
- Genre: Alternative country
- Label: Outside Music
- Producer: Dean Drouillard

Justin Rutledge chronology
Valleyheart (2013)	Daredevil (2014)	East (2016)

Daredevil is the sixth studio album by Canadian singer-songwriter Justin Rutledge, released April 22, 2014 on Outside Music.

The album consists entirely of cover versions of songs by The Tragically Hip. Guest musicians appearing on the album include Mary Margaret O'Hara, Andy Maize, Jenn Grant and Brendan Canning.

Later in 2014, Rutledge released Spring Is a Girl, an EP which included a cover of the Tragically Hip's "Bobcaygeon" which was recorded for but not included on the album, for sale on the Canadian web label Zunior. The EP also included the three formerly iTunes-exclusive bonus tracks from his 2013 album Valleyheart, one of which was also a Tragically Hip cover ("Nautical Disaster").

== Track listing ==
1. "Looking for a Place to Happen"
2. "Springtime in Vienna"
3. "Thugs"
4. "Escape Is at Hand for the Travellin' Man"
5. "Grace, Too"
6. "Locked in the Trunk of a Car"
7. "Courage (for Hugh MacLennan)"
8. "Long Time Running"
9. "Put It Off"
10. "Fiddler's Green"
