= The Last Crossing =

2002 novel by Guy Vanderhaeghe

- First edition cover
- Author: Guy Vanderhaeghe
- Publisher: McClelland & Stewart
- Publication date: 2002
- ISBN: 978-0-771-08737-0

The Last Crossing is a novel by Canadian writer Guy Vanderhaeghe, first published in 2002 by McClelland and Stewart.

A rethinking of the genre of the "western", The Last Crossing is a tale of interwoven lives and stories taking place in the last half of the 19th century, travelling from England to the United States and the Canadian west.

The Last Crossing received starred reviews from Booklist, Kirkus Reviews, and Publishers Weekly.

In 2004, it was nominated for the International Dublin Literary Award, and won the 2004 edition of Canada Reads, championed by musician Jim Cuddy.
