= My Present Age =

1984 novel by Guy Vanderhaeghe

- 1989 paperback edition
- Author: Guy Vanderhaeghe
- Language: English
- Genre: Novel
- Publisher: Macmillan of Canada
- Publication date: 1984
- Publication place: Canada
- Media type: Print (Hardback & Paperback)
- ISBN: 0-7715-9211-6 (1989 paperback edition)
- OCLC: 19513362

My Present Age is the title of a Canadian novel by Guy Vanderhaeghe which was first published in 1984. It is Vanderhaeghe's first full-length novel.

The novel has been translated into several languages.

== Plot ==
My Present Age is a continuation of the last two stories in Vanderhaeghe's Governor General's Award-winning debut, the short story collection Man Descending. It focuses on the character Ed, from "Sam, Soren and Ed". In the novel, Ed is trying to rebuild his life after his wife, Victoria, pregnant by another character, leaves him. He quarrels with neighbours, colleagues, and friends, forges letters, and is briefly hospitalised as a result of a revenge prank. He searches for Victoria, eventually finding her and giving her advice on her dilemma over whether to have an abortion. She then leaves him again, and he returns to his quarrelsome life.

== Critical reception ==
Canadian Review of Materials praised the interesting premise and the humour but concluded that readers would not identify with the protagonist: "Ed is too small-minded for the reader to hope he gets his wife back, but too pathetically dependent for the reader to hope he doesn't".

Kirkus Reviews found it unoriginal: "Its characters lack personality; its social criticism is jejune; and its humor seems aimed at the sophomoric, jock-fraternity set."
