= No Never Alone =

Studio album by Justin Rutledge
- Released: May 17, 2004
- Genre: alternative country
- Label: Six Shooter Records

Justin Rutledge chronology
No Never Alone (2004)	The Devil on a Bench in Stanley Park (2006)

No Never Alone is the debut album by Canadian singer-songwriter Justin Rutledge, released in 2004 on Six Shooter Records.

A remastered "deluxe edition" was released in 2012 on Outside Music. The process of revisiting the album's material in turn inspired his 2013 album Valleyheart, which he described in interviews as a response from his older, more mature and more experienced self to No Never Alone's "young kid who just wrote what he felt".

== Track listing ==
No.	Title	Length
1.	"Too Sober to Sleep"	4:56
2.	"A Letter to Heather"	5:20
3.	"1855"	5:51
4.	"Lay Me Down Sweet Jesus"	4:19
5.	"Sleeveless in Vancouver"	5:41
6.	"Year of Jubilo"	1:37
7.	"Federal Mail"	5:26
8.	"Special"	3:47
9.	"The Suffering of Pepe O'Malley, Pt. 3"	6:27
10.	"The Blackest Crow"	6:42
