= Roberto López (musician) =

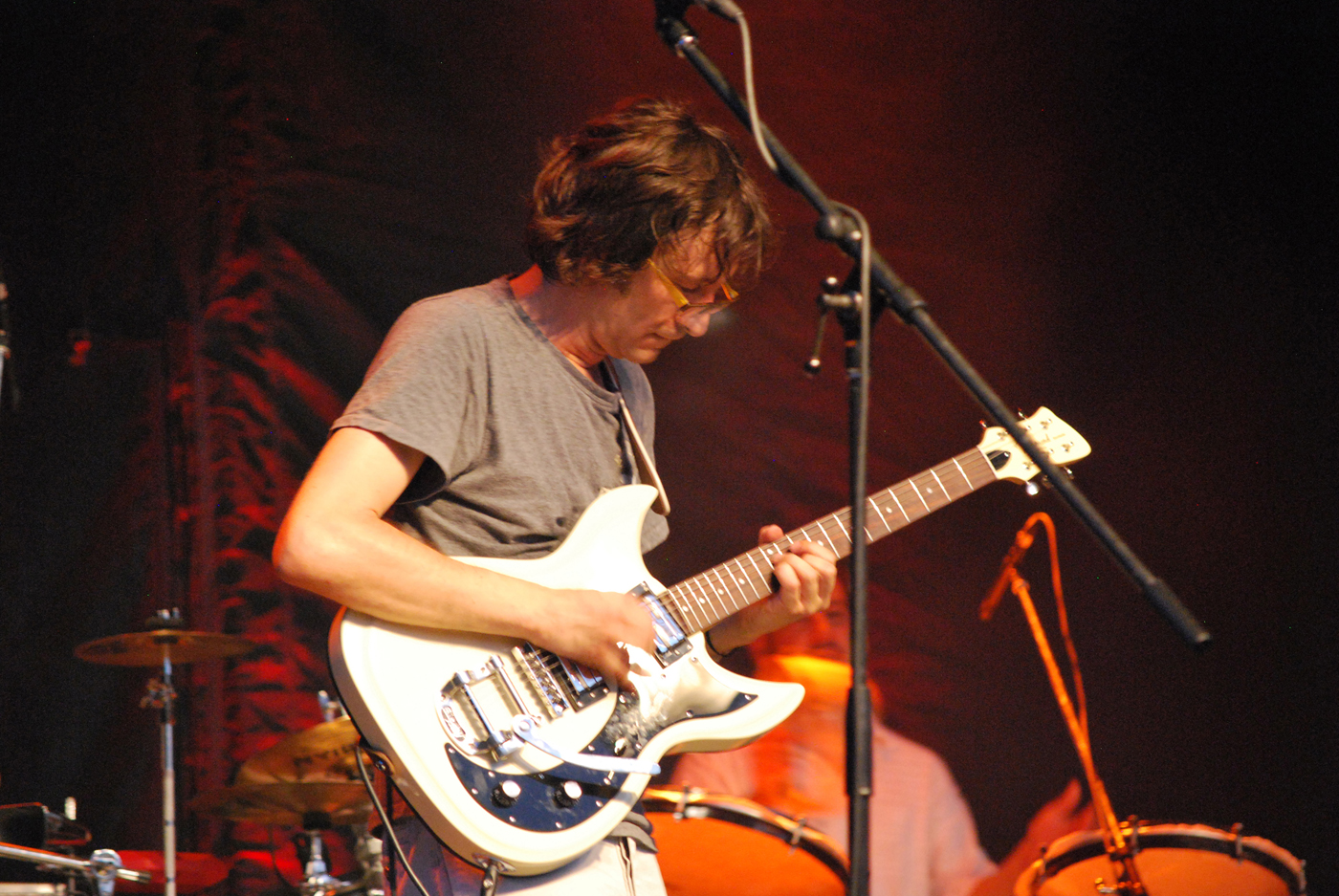
- Roberto López performing live

Background information
- Origin: Montreal, Quebec
- Genres: Cumbia, porró, mapalé, chandé, champeta, currulao, funk, jazz, rock, afrobeat
- Occupations: Composer, musician and producer

Roberto C. López is a Colombian-Canadian composer, musician and producer from Montreal, Quebec, whose style blends Afro-Colombian rhythms such as cumbia, porró, mapalé, chandé, champeta and currulao with urban styles such as funk, jazz, rock and afrobeat. He has released albums both under his own name and with the bands Roberto López Project and Roberto López Afro-Colombian Jazz Orchestra.

== Biography ==
His Roberto López Project albums were Que Pasa? (2006) and Soy Panamericano (2009), In 2012 he released Azul with the Roberto López Afro-Colombian Jazz Orchestra.

Under his own name he released Criollo Electrik in 2017, produced by Belizean producer Ivan Duran.

López has also composed for documentary films, and was nominated at the Prix Gémeaux for best original score for his work on the documentary program Esperanza. He was one of the composers of the music for the MLB Front Office Manager video game.

== Awards ==
He was named a Revelation of the Year in World Music by Ici Musique in 2011, alongside Alex Nevsky, Radio Radio and Samian in pop music, Rafael Zaldivar in jazz, Bambara Trans in world music and Jan Lisiecki in classical music.

He received a Juno Award nomination for World Music Album of the Year at the Juno Awards of 2011 for Soy Panamericano, a GAMIQ nomination for World Music Album of the Year in 2010 for Soy Panamericano and in 2012 for Azul, a Prix Félix nomination for World Music Album of the Year in 2013 for Azul and in 2018 for Criollo Electrik. Nominated at the Canadian Folk Music Award for World Artist of the Year - Group at the 6th Canadian Folk Music Awards for Soy Panamericano in 2010 and at the 8th Canadian Folk Music Awards for Azul in 2012, and for Best Instrumental Solo Artist at the 13th Canadian Folk Music Awards in 2017 for Criollo Electrik.
