= Something Easy =

Studio album by Justin Rutledge
- Released: May 19, 2023
- Genre: Alternative country
- Label: Encore Records

Justin Rutledge chronology
Islands (2021)	Something Easy (2023)

Something Easy is the tenth studio album by Canadian singer-songwriter Justin Rutledge, released May 19, 2023, on Encore Records.

Rutledge noted that as he is now a father to two young boys, the album was marked by a very different creative process than his past work, as the increased demands on his time have made it much harder to set aside time for writing and recording music. It was also his first fully self-produced album, marked in part by his efforts to learn some of the technical aspects of recording that he had not fully mastered working with co-producers in the past, as well as taking guitar lessons to refine his established self-taught guitar technique. The process ultimately took him two full years.

According to Rutledge, "a song like 'Cowards', for example, is a song that was a series of fuck-ups until I didn't fuck up anymore."

== Critical response ==
Ben Rayner of the Toronto Star wrote that "it's not quite his Kid A, but it does a nice job of refreshing his sound for the future, whatever that future might hold. All those sleepless nights and frustrating dead-ends did bear fruit in the end."

For Le Devoir, Sylvain Cormier rated the album three-and-a-half stars, comparing it favourably to the work of Patrick Watson and Half Moon Run.

For Great Dark Wonder, Douglas McLean wrote that "the lyrics are sparse and cryptic, more like pencil outlines, hinting more than fully explaining, teasing the imagination, inviting speculation, more like haiku than biography. The lyrical poetry sung by Rutledge in a honeyed, tender whisper, is fortified by a wide array of musical components- beguiling electric guitar, a dazzling mixture of natural and electronic drumming, glistening, swooping pedal steel, horns and strings, sonic flourishes, backing vocals, soft as summer rain. All combined to take your breath away."

== Track listing ==
No.	Title	Length
1.	"Angry Young Man"	5:39
2.	"Seventeen"	4:30
3.	"Cowards"	3:28
4.	"Head for the Hills"	4:39
5.	"Not Myself"	4:52
6.	"Easy"	4:21
7.	"Lioness"	4:31
8.	"Mary"	2:45
9.	"London"	6:07
