= Thumbelina's One Night Stand =

Studio album by Melissa McClelland
- Released: 2006
- Genre: Pop-Noir
- Label: Orange, Universal
- Producer: Luke Doucet

Melissa McClelland chronology
Stranded in Suburbia (2004)	Thumbelina's One Night Stand (2006)	Victoria Day (2009)

Thumbelina's One Night Stand is Melissa McClelland's third album. The album was released in 2006 in Canada by the Orange Record Label.

== Performers ==
- Melissa McClelland: vocals, backup vocals, guitars
- Luke Doucet: guitars, vibes, wurlitizers, rhodes, backup vocals, piano, pedal steel, percussion, pump organ, harmonica
- Rick May: electric and acoustic bass guitars, chamberlain, melotron, vibes, organ
- Paul Brennan: drums and percussion
- Janine Stoll, Lisa Winn, Katie McClelland, Chris Sheenan-Dyck: backing vocals

== Track listing ==
1. "Passenger 24"
2. "Iroquois Street Factory"
3. "Solitary Life"
4. "A Price To Pay"
5. "You Know I Love You Baby"
6. "The Taxi Ride"
7. "Intermission"
8. "Go Down Matthew"
9. "Goodbye To You"
10. "Skyway Bridge"
11. "Come Home, Suzie"
12. "Dayton, Ohio 1903"
13. "Oh, Love!"
14. "Whisper (Jeff Trott mix)" - Bonus Track
15. "You Know I Love You Baby (Jeff Trott mix)" - Bonus Track
16. "Outro"
- All songs written by Melissa McClelland, except Track 15 (by Ali Bartlett) and Track 12 (by Randy Newman)
- Chloe Doucet-Winkelman performs vocals on "Oh Love!"
- Greg Keelor performs vocals on "Skyway Bridge"
- Sarah McLachlan performs vocals on "Go Down Matthew"
