= Orange Record Label =

- Founded: 2003
- Founder: Steven Ehrlick; Jill Snell; Aubrey Winfield
- Distributor: Universal Music Canada
- Genre: Various
- Country of origin: Canada
- Location: Toronto, Ontario
- Official website: orangerecordlabel.com

Orange Record Label was a Canadian independent record label, located in Toronto, Ontario, Canada. Orange recordings were distributed in Canada by Universal Music Canada, which was also a minority stakeholder in the label.

Orange is also used to record and distribute the songs featured on the Instant Star television series starring Alexz Johnson. Stephen Stohn, executive Producer of Instant Star, is also a minority stakeholder and director of Orange.

Orange also plays host to the Live @ Orange Sessions which are recorded in the Orange Lounge Recording Studio for webcasting on Bell Sympatico. Orange's distribution arm, Starcana Distribution, facilitates the national distribution of independent labels and artists. Artists who have performed in Live @ Orange Sessions include Katy Perry, Alexz Johnson, All American Rejects, Hedley, Pussycat Dolls, OneRepublic, Nelly Furtado, Creed, Emily Osment, Chris Cornell, Amy Winehouse, Keith Urban, Sugarland, The Fray, and Colbie Caillat.

Orange Record Label is directly linked to The Orange Lounge Recording Company, the active record label home to artists such as Justin Hines and Ash & Bloom, and holds the catalogues of Alexz Johnson, Johnny Hollow, Tyler Kyte, and Robyn Dell’Unto.

== Former Orange artists ==
- Paul Brandt
- Jim Bryson
- Johnny Hollow
- Jakalope
- Billy Klippert
- Chris Koster
- Tyler Kyte
- Maestro
- Melissa McClelland
- Money Money
- Louise Pitre
- Tara Slone

== See also ==
- List of record labels
