= Islands (Justin Rutledge album) =

Studio album by Justin Rutledge
- Released: March 26, 2021
- Recorded: 2020
- Genre: Alternative country
- Label: Outside Music

Justin Rutledge chronology
Passages (2019)	Islands (2021)	Something Easy (2023)

Islands is the ninth studio album by Canadian singer-songwriter Justin Rutledge, released on March 26, 2021 on Outside Music. The album comprises new re-recordings of songs from throughout his career, in a project meant to provide insight into his songwriting process by redoing each song in a manner reflective of how it was originally conceived and written, and structured to resemble one of his live concerts.

"Jellybean", a song which Rutledge wrote in his early 20s and has regularly performed live as the conclusion to most of his concerts but has never previously recorded for an album, was released in February 2021 as the album's first single. According to Rutledge, he has tried to record the song for commercial release before, but found it difficult to get right in a studio context as it's a song designed for a large room full of people to sing along. With the album's recording taking place during the COVID-19 pandemic, he arrived at the recorded version of "Jellybean" by recording a vocal and guitar track on his own, and then sending it to several other friends with home recording studios so that they could record themselves singing along to it, and then adding each vocal performance to the mix to create the group vocals. Participants in the recording included Matthew Barber, David Baxter, Rebecca Hunt, Dan Mangan, Blake Manning, Kara Manovitch, Annelise Noronha and Kate Rogers.

== Track listing ==
1. "Come Summertime" – 5:19
2. "Good Man" – 4:47
3. "This Is War" – 5:18
4. "Out of the Woods" – 4:32
5. "Federal Mail" – 4:11
6. "Nautical Disaster" – 5:00
7. "Alberta Breeze" – 6:40
8. "St. Peter" – 3:46
9. "Jellybean" – 4:38
