= The Devil on a Bench in Stanley Park =

Studio album by Justin Rutledge
- Released: October 2, 2006
- Recorded: The Woodshed, The Rogue, Toronto
- Genre: Alternative country
- Label: Six Shooter
- Producer: David Baxter, Justin Rutledge

Justin Rutledge chronology
No Never Alone (2004)	The Devil on a Bench in Stanley Park (2006)	Man Descending (2008)

The Devil on a Bench in Stanley Park is the second album by Canadian alt-country singer-songwriter Justin Rutledge, released on October 2, 2006, on Six Shooter Records. Recorded at a number of studios in Toronto, the album was produced by David Baxter and Justin Rutledge.

The album's positive critical reception prompted NOW magazine to name Rutledge as Toronto singer-songwriter of the year in 2006.

== Track listing ==
All tracks are written by Justin Rutledge

No.	Title	Length
1.	"Robin's Tune"	4:49
2.	"I'm Your Man, You're My Radio"	4:23
3.	"Does It Make You Rain?"	4:44
4.	"Come Summertime"	4:50
5.	"Backseat Honeymoon/Blue Is What I Do"	6:00
6.	"The Suffering of Pepe O'Malley, Pt. 4"	6:04
7.	"Emily Returns"	5:28
8.	"I Am with Her Where the Avalanche Begins"	5:17
9.	"This Is War"	6:45
10.	"I'm Gonna Die (One Sunny Day)"	4:04
