= Foggy Hogtown Boys =

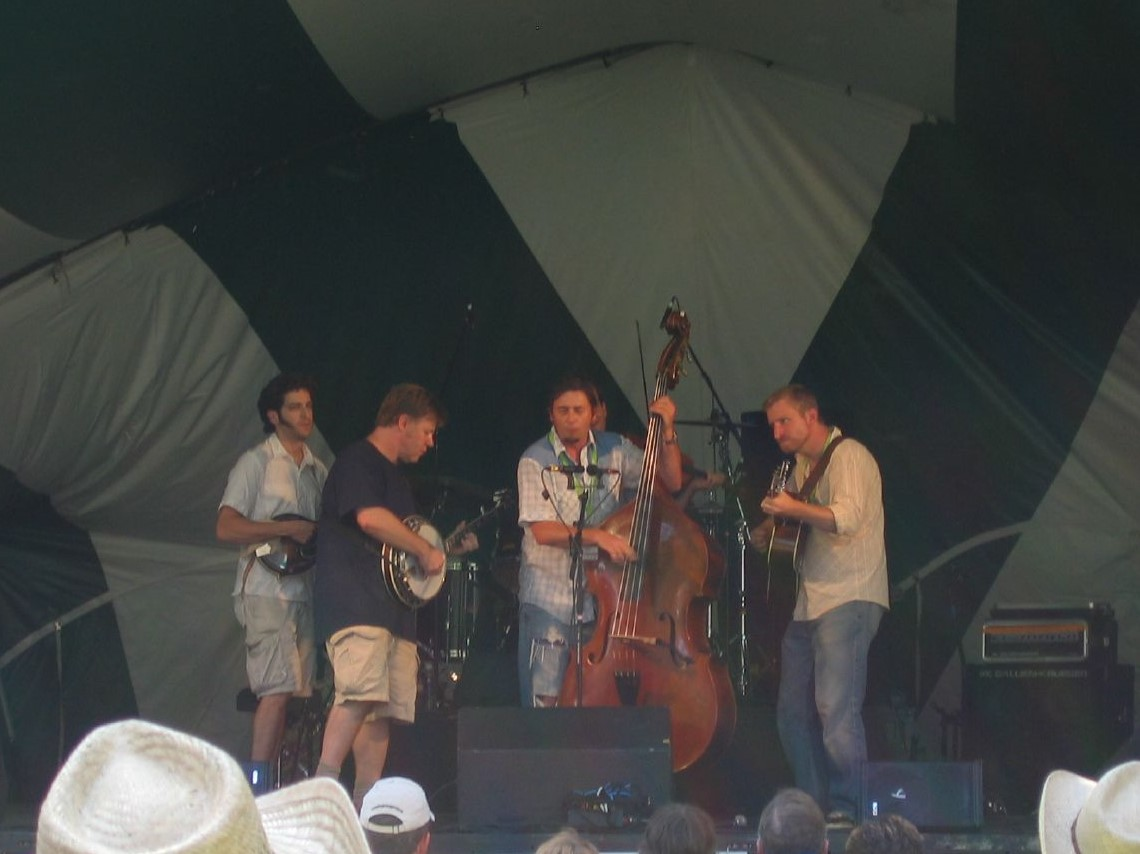
- Foggy Hogtown Boys, July 2007

Background information
- Origin: Toronto, Ontario, Canada
- Genres: bluegrass music
- Years active: 2001–present
- Members: John Showman; Andrew Collins; Chris Coole; Chris Quinn
- Past members: John McNaughton; Max Heineman

The Foggy Hogtown Boys is a Canadian bluegrass band, based in Toronto, Ontario.

The band recorded their first CD live at the Lula Lounge in Toronto in 2004. They have since recorded several more critically acclaimed CDs. Their album "Pigtown Fling" was nominated for two awards at the 3rd Canadian Folk Music Awards, and were nominated again at the 4th and 6th Awards.

In 2005, when the band was playing weekly at the Dominion Tavern in Toronto, they were considered to be the best traditional bluegrass band in the city.

In 2006, the band toured western Canada, performing at Millennium Place in Whistler, British Columbia, and at the Kootenay Bluegrass Society.

In 2007, the Foggy Hogtown Boys played a double bill with the American band the Grascals at the Silver Dollar tavern in Toronto. That year they also performed at a concert organized by the Pineridge Bluegrass Folklore Society in Oshawa, Ontario, and at the Calgary Folk Music Festival in Alberta.

In 2011, the band took part in the Hudson Music Festival in Quebec.

Members of the Foggy Hogtown Boys include John Showman on fiddle, Andrew Collins on mandolin, Chris Coole on guitar, and Chris Quinn on banjo. Bass was played until 2007 by John McNaughton, and after that by Max Heineman. Showman, Collins and Quinn also play in Creaking Tree String Quartet, a less traditional group, and Showman also plays in New Country Rehab.
