= East (Justin Rutledge album) =

Studio album by Justin Rutledge
- Released: 2016
- Genre: Alternative country
- Label: Outside Music
- Producer: Daniel Ledwell

Justin Rutledge chronology
Daredevil (2014)	East (2016)	Passages (2019)

East is the seventh studio album by Canadian singer-songwriter Justin Rutledge, released in 2016 on Outside Music. The album's title has a dual meaning, reflecting both Rutledge's move from Toronto to a new home in the Prince Edward County region of Ontario following his 2014 album Daredevil, and the fact that the album was recorded in Halifax, Nova Scotia.

The album was produced by Daniel Ledwell.

== Track listing ==
1. "Unsettled"
2. "The Great Ascension"
3. "North Wind"
4. "Blue Jeans"
5. "Heaven Help Us"
6. "Almost Gone"
7. "No One Knows"
8. "The Old Oak"
9. "Hey Little Boy"
10. "Queen Street Lost"
