= Melissa McClelland =

American-born Canadian singer-songwriter (born 1979)

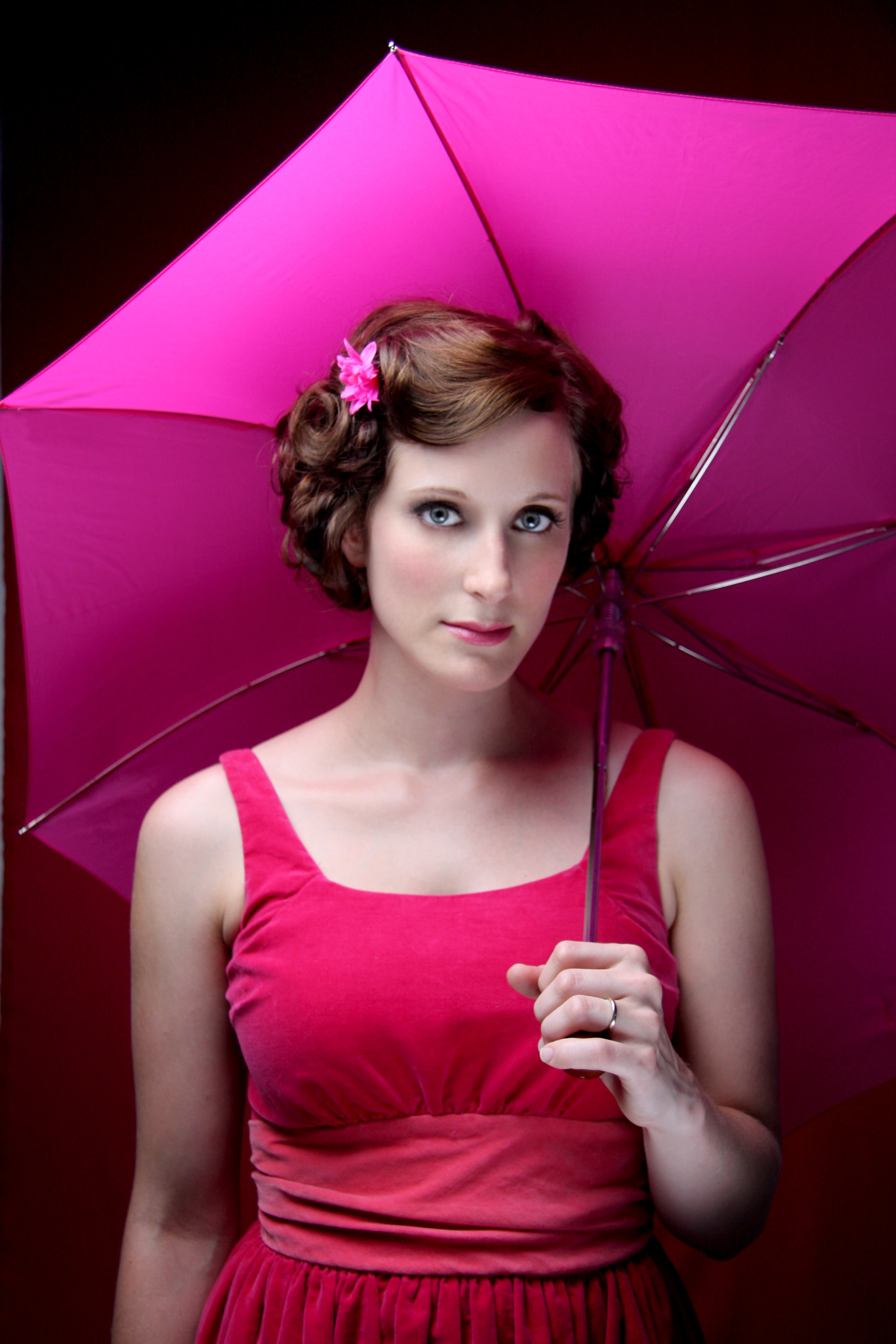
- Melissa McClelland

Background information
- Born: 18 May 1979 (age 46); Chicago, Illinois, United States
- Origin: Toronto, Ontario, Canada
- Genres: Pop, rock, folk rock, pop rock
- Occupation: Singer-songwriter
- Instruments: Vocals, guitar, bass
- Labels: Six Shooter Records, Orange

Melissa McClelland (born 18 May 1979) is an American-born Canadian singer-songwriter who lived in Hamilton, Ontario, in her youth and now bases her career from Toronto, Ontario. McClelland's music is influenced by blues and Americana. A writer on CMJ's staff blog wrote that McClelland has "a persona reminiscent of a female Tom Waits."

== Biography ==
Melissa McClelland was born in Chicago, Illinois. She spent her youth in Burlington, Ontario, before developing her career in Toronto, Ontario. McClelland married Luke Doucet on 24 June 2006; the two have played together on numerous stages, including at the 2006 Calgary Folk Music Festival. He has produced three of her records, Stranded in Suburbia, Thumbelina's One Night Stand, and Victoria Day.

In 2006, McClelland opened for Matthew Good's solo acoustic tour across Canada. During the tour the two singers closed Matthew Good's set with a duet performance of the Nine Inch Nails song "Hurt".

She also works with Sarah McLachlan, playing guitar and bass and providing backing vocals at her live shows. McLachlan makes a guest appearance on the song "Go Down Matthew" from McClelland's album Thumbelina's One Night Stand.

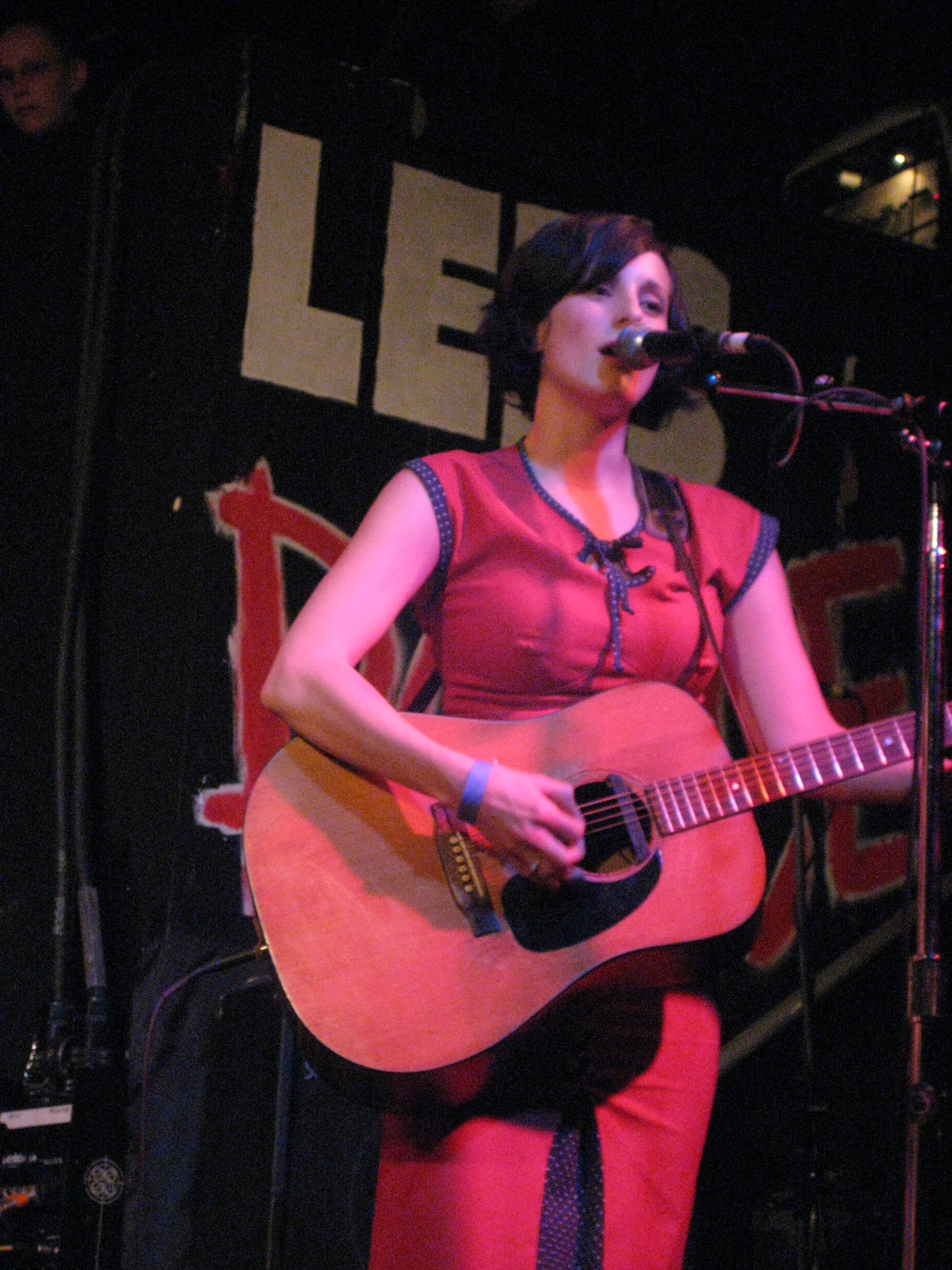
Performing live

"Skyway Bridge" (off of Thumbelina's One Night Stand) features Greg Keelor from Blue Rodeo. Additionally, McClelland is the only guest artist on Blue Rodeo's 2008 live album, Blue Road.

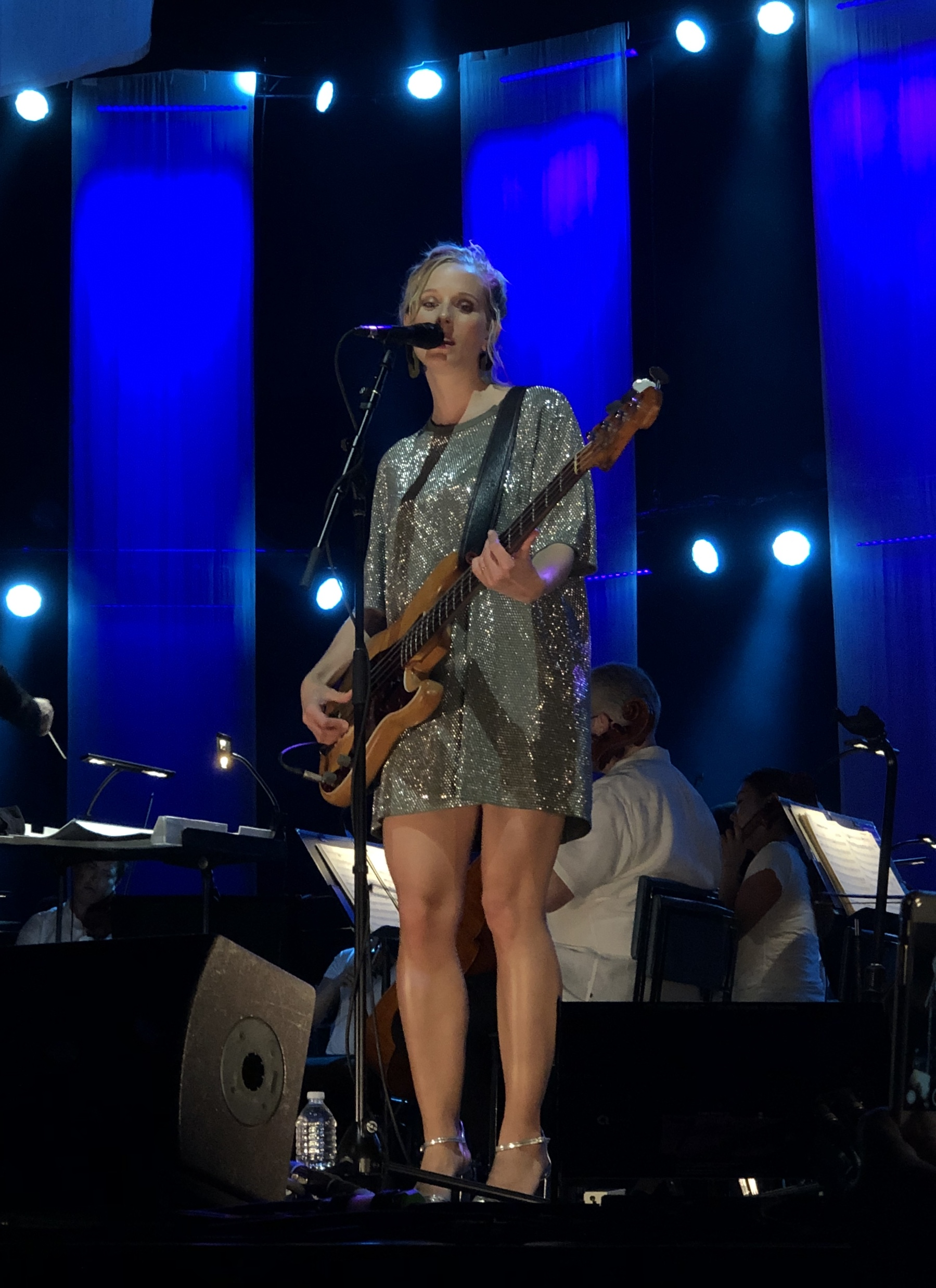
Melissa McClelland at Wolf Trap 2019

In 2007, McClelland opened a tour with Jesse Cook and sang on his recording of "It Ain't Me Babe" (a Bob Dylan cover) which was released on his 2007 album Frontiers. "It Ain't Me Babe" was released as a single from that album, which spent three weeks in the top position on Billboard's world music charts.

Also in 2007, McClelland's "Passenger 24" won in the 6th Annual Independent Music Awards for Best Americana Song.

McClelland's song "Rooftop" was featured on the 2005 soundtrack CD of the television series Degrassi: The Next Generation. The song was played on the ending montage of the 2004 episode "Time Stands Still Pt. 2", in which a main character, Jimmy Brooks (Aubrey Graham) was shot by a bullied student, Rick Murray (Ephraim Ellis). She also performed the theme song for the children's reality show This Is Daniel Cook. In 2008, she contributed to the soundtrack of the film One Week.

== Discography ==
As a solo artist

- 2001: Melissa McClelland (Daddy Warbucks Records/independent)
- 20 April 2004: Stranded in Suburbia (Orange/Universal)
- 23 May 2006: Thumbelina's One Night Stand (Orange/Universal)
- 14 April 2009: Victoria Day (Six Shooter Records)

As a member of Whitehorse

- 30 August 2011: Whitehorse (Six Shooter Records)
- 28 August 2012: The Fate of the World Depends on This Kiss (Six Shooter Records)
- 17 February 2015: Leave No Bridge Unburned (Six Shooter Records)
- 7 July 2017: Panther in the Dollhouse (Six Shooter Records)
- 2 November 2018: A Whitehorse Winter Classic (Six Shooter Records)
- 19 March 2021: Modern Love (Six Shooter Records)
- 8 September 2021: Strike Me Down (Six Shooter Records)
- 13 January 2023: I'm Not Crying, You're Crying (Six Shooter Records)

=== Stranded in Suburbia ===
In 2004, McClelland released Stranded in Suburbia on Orange Record Label. In the same year, her side-band Ladybird Sideshow released a live album entitled Ladybird Sideshow Live at the Orange Lounge.

=== Thumbelina's One Night Stand ===
McClelland's follow-up album, Thumbelina's One Night Stand was released in 2006. Reviews drew attention to the eclectic nature of the album. Exclaim! Magazine described the album as "impossible to pin down stylistically, as it segues from roots-y rock ("Passenger 24") to country ("Taxi Ride") to chamber pop ("Solitary Life") to folk (a cover of Randy Newman's "Dayton Ohio") and blues ("Go Down Matthew")."

=== Victoria Day ===
In late 2008, Melissa McClelland began work on Victoria Day, her fourth album, and first for Six Shooter Records. Victoria Day was scheduled for release on 14 April 2009. The album was recorded at Canterbury Music by Jeremy Darby, and was produced by Luke Doucet.

Victoria Day has a vintage 1950s sound, combining dixieland with "high lonesome twang". "Seasoned Lovers", from Victoria Day, features vocals from Canadian singer-songwriter Ron Sexsmith.

=== Whitehorse ===
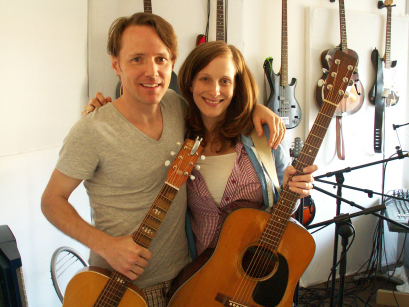
Whitehorse

In 2011, McClelland and her husband Luke Doucet released a self-titled album under the moniker Whitehorse on Six Shooter Records. It included reworked versions of McClelland's hit "Passenger 24" and Doucet's hit "Broken" and was recorded at the Catherine North studio in Hamilton, Ontario, Sarah McLachlan's house in Vancouver, British Columbia and a studio located at McLelland's and Doucet's house.

=== Collaborations ===
- 2004: Outlaws (Live & Unreleased) by Luke Doucet (Providing vocals on "Gun St. Girl")
- 2004: Ladybird Sideshow Live at the Orange Lounge by Ladybird Sideshow
- 2006: Do You Hear What I Hear? (Providing vocals on "O Holy Night")
- 2007: This is Daniel Cook – Here We Are! (Providing vocals on "This Is Daniel Cook Theme Song")
- 2007: Frontiers by Jesse Cook (Providing vocals on "It Ain't Me Babe")
- 2007: Borrowed Tunes II: A Tribute to Neil Young (Providing vocals on "Cinnamon Girl")
- 2008: Blood's Too Rich by Luke Doucet and the White Falcon
- 2008: Blue Road (Live at Massey Hall) by Blue Rodeo (Providing vocals on "Know Where You Go" and "Tell Me Your Dream")
- 2008: One Week Soundtrack (Providing vocals on "Un Canadien errant")
- 2010: First of the Last to Know by Peter Katz (Providing vocals on "Let Me Know")
- 2010: Steel City Trawler by Luke Doucet and the White Falcon

=== DVDs ===
- 2007: Pedal to Steel
- 2007: Jesse Cook: One Night at the Metropolis (Special Guest Appearance)
- 2008: Blue Road (Live at Massey Hall Bootleg) by Blue Rodeo (Providing vocals on "Know Where You Go" and "Tell Me Your Dream")

=== Covers ===
- 2001: Rob Lamothe covered "Whisper" on Steering with My Knee
