= Beyond the Pale (band) =

Canadian world/roots fusion band

- Origin: Toronto, Ontario, Canada
- Genres: Klezmer; Balkan; Romanian; bluegrass; jazz; reggae; funk
- Years active: 1998–present
- Labels: Borealis
- Members: Eric Stein; Martin van de Ven; Milos Popovic; Bogdan Djukic; Aleksandar Gajic; Bret Higgins
- Past members: Anne Lindsay; Sasha Luminsky; Joshua Engel
- Website: www.beyondthepale.net

Beyond the Pale is a Toronto-based Canadian world/roots fusion band. Their style is rooted in klezmer, Balkan and Romanian music but heavily accented with contemporary and North American styles including bluegrass, jazz, reggae, funk and classical chamber music. They are known for unique songcraft, virtuosic musicianship, meticulous dynamics, and exuberant live performances. They are widely regarded as one of Canada's most accomplished and innovative acoustic ensembles. Some have described their sound as being in the same spirit as "New Acoustic Music" and David Grisman's "Dawg" music, but tinged more heavily with an east European accent. The name of the band is a reference to the Eastern-European Jewish Pale of Settlement, from where their music is partially inspired.

== History ==
Beyond the Pale was formed in 1998. Original members included mandolinist Eric Stein, bassist Bret Higgins and guitarist Joshua Engel. They were joined by violinist Anne Lindsay the following year. Dutch Clarinetist Martin van de Ven joined the group in 2000 while Engel left the same year. Serbian-born violinist Bogdan Djukic gradually replaced Lindsay over 2000-2001.

The band released its first CD, Routes, in 2001 through Borealis Records; the recording was nominated for a Canadian Independent Music Award.

In 2002, Serbian-born accordionist Milos Popovic joined the group, replacing Sasha Luminsky, who had played with the group the previous two years. A second album, Consensus, was recorded live at the Al Green Theatre in Toronto in 2003 and released the following year. This album received great acclaim and captured a Canadian Folk Music Award for "Instrumental Group of the Year." "Consensus" was also nominated for a Toronto Independent Music Award, and Eric Stein's composition "Reunion" from that album won the Folk Music Ontario Song from the Heart award for songwriting. In fall 2004, the group was joined by Serbian-born violinist Aleksandar Gajic.

Between 2001–2010, Beyond the Pale toured across North America and Europe, including performances at Carnegie Hall, the Jewish Culture Festival in Kraków, and the Governor General's Performing Arts Awards at the National Arts Centre in Ottawa. During this period the band was involved in many collaborative projects, including a series of concerts with legendary singer/actor Theodore Bikel, numerous collaborations with Josh "Socalled" Dolgin, two separate stints as guest accompanists with the Toronto Jewish Folk Choir on world premieres of ambitious choral works, guest soloist turns with the Toronto Children's Chorus on a world premiere composition by clarinetist van de Ven, and performances alongside CBC radio personality Barbara Budd with the National Arts Centre Orchestra, the Toronto Philharmonic Orchestra and the Kitchener-Waterloo Symphony. There were also self-initiated collaborations with other world music ensembles such as Creaking Tree String Quartet and L'Orchestra di Piazza Vittorio. The group was also featured in a number of national radio broadcasts for CBC's Canada Live, including the performance of interpretations for the CBC's A New World of Mozart, which honoured the 250th birthday of Wolfgang Amadeus Mozart.

In 2009, the group released its third album Postcards, which featured guest appearances by Israeli Yiddish singer Vira Lozinsky Postcards received four nominations from the 2010 Canadian Folk Music Awards and won for "Instrumental Group of the Year" and "Pushing the Boundaries". In 2011, the group toured in Australia, and in Brazil in 2012.

In 2017, Beyond the Pale released a new album, Ruckus, and was nominated at the Canadian Folk Music Awards for Instrumental Group of the Year.

== Members ==
- Eric Stein (mandolin)
- Martin van de Ven (clarinet)
- Milos Popovic (accordion)
- Bogdan Djukic (violin, percussion)
- Aleksandar Gajic (violin)
- Bret Higgins (bass)

== Discography ==
- 2001 – Routes (Borealis)
- 2004 – Consensus (Borealis)
- 2009 – Postcards (Borealis)
- 2017 – Ruckus (Borealis)
