= Man Descending =

Collection of short stories by Guy Vanderhaeghe

- First edition
- Author: Guy Vanderhaeghe
- Cover artist: Nick Bantock (first edition)
- Language: English
- Genre: Short Stories
- Publisher: Macmillan of Canada (first edition), Bodley Head (first UK edition), Ticknor & Fields (first American edition)
- Publication date: 1982
- Publication place: Canada
- Media type: Print (hardback & paperback)
- Pages: 230 (first edition)
- ISBN: 0-7715-9713-4 (first edition, hardcover) ISBN 0-7715-9261-2 (1986 paperback edition)
- OCLC: 9154604
- Dewey Decimal: 813/.54 19
- LC Class: PR9199.3.V384 M3 1982

Man Descending is a collection of short stories written by Saskatchewan-born writer Guy Vanderhaeghe. The book was first published by Macmillan of Canada in 1982 and Vanderhaeghe went on to become one of the few first-time authors to win the coveted Governor General's Award for Fiction for this work. It also won the Geoffrey Faber Memorial Prize.

The book consists of 12 stories covering different ages in people's lives, ranging from teenage romance to the onset of Alzheimer's disease. Among the more often-quoted stories in this work are "Sam, Soren and Ed" which introduced characters Vanderhaeghe would later feature in his first novel, My Present Age, and "The Expatriates' Party" in which a high school teacher launches a profanity-laced tirade against a troublesome student.

Several stories in this collection were previously published in Canadian literary journals, magazines, and compilations. One story, "Reunion", was later reprinted in an edition of Best American Short Stories, even though its author was Canadian.

A short film by Raymond Lorenz and Neil Grieve, based upon the story "Man Descending", was nominated for the Genie Award for Best Theatrical Short Film at the 12th Genie Awards. Canadian singer-songwriter Justin Rutledge's 2008 album Man Descending was also named for the book.

== Story list ==
1. The Watcher
2. Reunion
3. How the Story Ends
4. What I Learned from Caesar
5. Drummer
6. Cages
7. Going to Russia
8. A Taste for Perfection
9. The Expatriates' Party
10. Dancing Bear
11. no
12. Sam, Soren and Ed
