= Paul Cresey =

Canadian singer-songwriter

- Born: December 20, 1989 (age 36)
- Origin: Edmonton, Alberta
- Genres: Folk rock
- Years active: 2007–present
- Label: Indie

Paul Cresey (born December 20, 1989) is a Canadian singer-songwriter, born in Edmonton, Alberta. Cresey has received national attention on the Canadian folk music scene and was nominated for Young Performer of the Year at the 2008 Canadian Folk Music Awards.

== Biography ==
Born in Edmonton, Alberta, Paul attended W. P. Wagner High School and finished an Education degree at the University of Alberta. Paul received his first acoustic guitar at the age of 10, but was unable to play it because it was right-handed. Frustrated, Paul did not take up the guitar again until age 12, when his family purchased him a left-handed guitar. After two years of lessons, Cresey began to work on finger-picking techniques and new strumming patterns and groomed his passion for folk music. Cresey formed a two-person acoustic guitar duo called The Lefties and subsequently joined a four-person band called Four Leaf Clover (the name was not completely decided upon by all members). These bands performed mostly acoustic and classic rock cover songs. Cresey's first on stage performance was not a success and left him unable to perform in front of an audience for quite some time. With some gentle prodding from friends and family, Cresey was able to take to the stage once again. The first gig that really sparked his interest in performing was at a Kenilworth Junior High School talent show in front of an audience of around 500 people.

Cresey has since pursued a solo career, and writes and performs all of his material at coffee houses and open stage performances. Not completely exclusive to folk music, Cresey performs many other musical genres including rock, blues, Celtic and folk rock. Cresey's influences include Gordon Lightfoot, Bob Dylan, Neil Young and Leonard Cohen among others. Cresey's voice has been compared to other artists like Dave Grohl and Jack Johnson. Cresey initially found songwriting difficult, but his first song "The Letter" was the catalyst for his songwriting ability and he soon penned multiple other songs. He released his debut album Piece the Picture in October 2007, and it was widely received on Edmonton airwaves. The Edmonton Journal wrote, "It's a diverse album with blues, Celtic and pop-folk angles alongside the romantic balladry you might expect."

Cresey is also a featured musician in A Night of Artists. He became a featured artist in the Under-22 Songwriters’ Circle on CKUA Radio Alberta and received a nomination for Young Performer of the Year at the Canadian Folk Music Awards in St. John's, Newfoundland.

== Discography ==
- Piece the Picture (2007)
- When Beauty Has Passed (2009)
- Paul Cresey (2011)
