= Justin Hines =

Canadian singer-songwriter

- Origin: Newmarket, Ontario
- Genres: Pop rock, acoustic rock Folk rock, folk,
- Occupations: Singer-songwriter, poet
- Instruments: Vocals, guitar, harmonica, keyboards/piano
- Website: www.justinhines.com

Justin Hines is a Canadian singer-songwriter who was born in Newmarket, Ontario.

Hines has a rare genetic joint condition called Larsen's syndrome and uses a power wheelchair. He is a strong supporter of numerous charities and has performed at many fund raising events. He founded the Justin Hines Foundation, a charitable foundation for people with disabilities.

== Life and career ==
From a very early age, Hines was enthralled with music. He would spend hours listening to his father's jukebox, and sang often. His first glimmer of success came when he was at the young age of 14. After winning a radio contest against hundreds of participants, Hines got the privilege to sing at a Toronto Raptors game.

Hines' musical career continued to grow as a teenager while performing on YTV and Treehouse TV. His work there included the video 'Tomato Hat'. That video was included on the 1997 children's program Ants in Your Pants.

He collaborated with producer Justin Abedin on his first album entitled Sides. In reference to the album, Justin says "I made a conscious effort to abandon any trends, I just wanted to do something that was very honest. I wanted to just be Justin, whatever that was."

His second album Chasing Silver was released on 2 June 2009. It includes the hit single "Say What You Will". It became the No. 1 downloaded singer-songwriter track within 48 hours of releasing it online. The video was also an instant success, as it became one of the favourite and most emailed videos on Sympatico/MSN.

In 2009, Hines sang "There's No Place Like This" on a television commercial for Tourism Ontario.

On 4 March 2010, Justin was part of the first-ever Canadian Paralympic Torch Relay. "As Canada gets ready to host the world's best Paralympic winter athletes starting on March 12, the inspirational 10-day journey of the Vancouver 2010 Paralympic Torch Relay is officially underway with the first group of Paralympic Torchbearers – one from each province and territory – gathering in the nation's capital to create stories that will inspire the nation. More than 600 torchbearers will proudly carry the flame as the Vancouver 2010 Paralympic Torch Relay, presented by Coca-Cola and RBC and supported by the Government of Canada and the Province of BC, visits 11 communities over the next 10 days, culminating in the lighting of the Paralympic Cauldron at BC Place in downtown Vancouver on March 12, 2010."

In 2013 after the release of his studio album "How We Fly", Hines embarked on the Vehicle of Change Tour alongside Hamilton duo Ash & Bloom. The two acts traveled across North America, partnering with charities in each city and donating 100% of ticket sales back to the charity. Justin is managed by JAD Media in Toronto, Ontario, Canada. In 2014, he was made a Member of the Order of Ontario in recognition for being a gifted singer and songwriter who has performed across the globe using his success to raise millions of dollars through the Justin Hines Foundation for dozens of charities throughout the world.

Hines has entertained audiences from China to the Middle East and toured throughout Canada and the United States. He played at the 2008/2009 Clifton Hill New Years Party in Niagara Falls, Ontario, Canada alongside Kim Mitchell and Supertramp lead singer Roger Hodgson.

== Discography ==
=== Albums ===
- Sides
- Seasons Greetings
- Chasing Silver (2009)
- Days to Recall (2011) CAN No. 100
- How We Fly (2013)

=== Singles/videos ===
- "Tomato Hat"
- "Say What You Will"
- "Wish You Well"
- "April on the Ground"
- "Courage (Come Out to Play)"
- "Tell Me I'm Wrong

== TV appearances ==
- CBS News Sunday Morning – 18 December 2011
