= Justin Rutledge =

Canadian musician (born 1979)

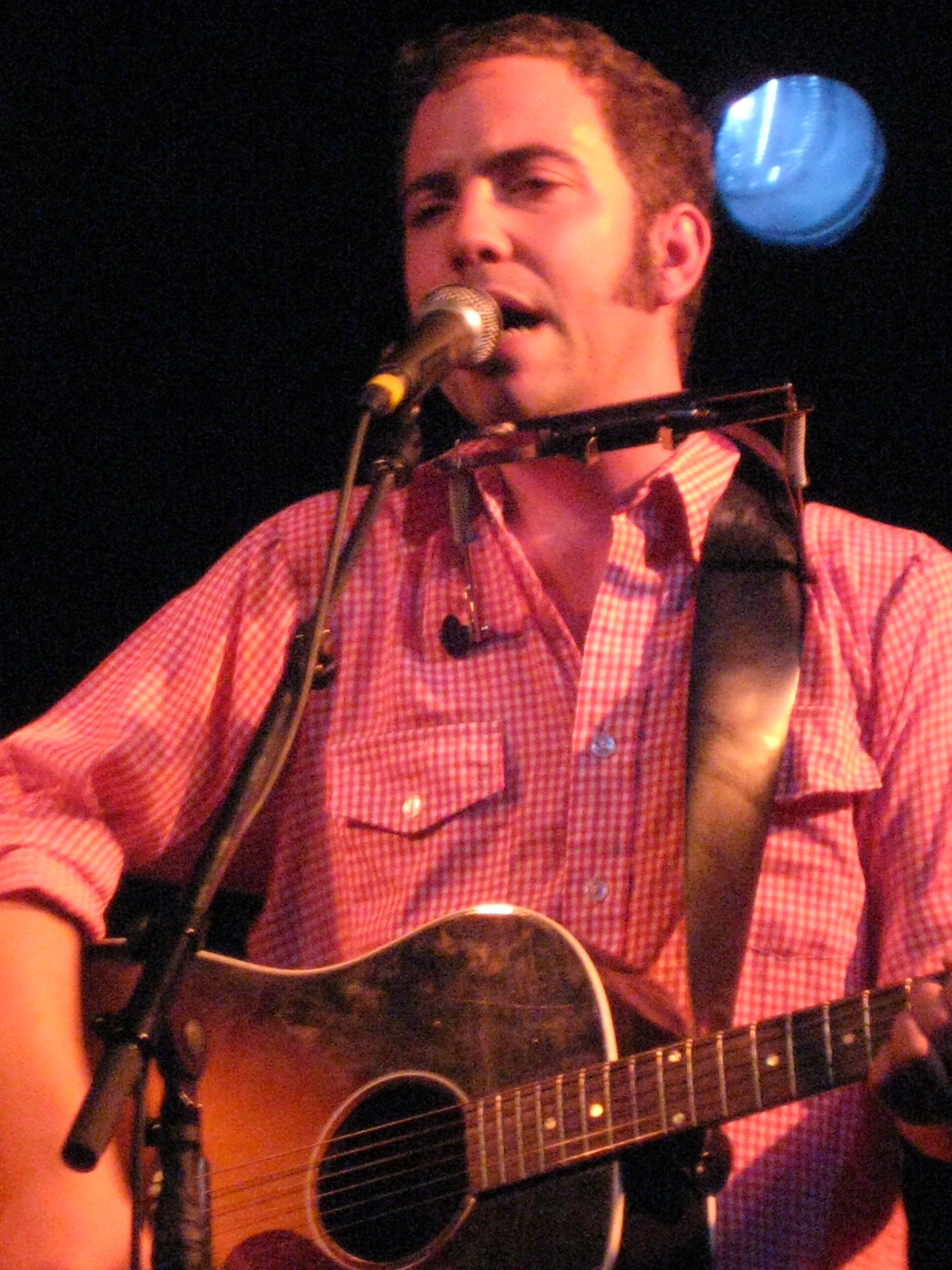
- Rutledge performing in 2007

Background information
- Born: January 3, 1979 (age 47)
- Origin: Toronto, Ontario, Canada
- Genre: Alternative country
- Occupation: Musician
- Instruments: Vocals; guitar; harmonica
- Labels: Six Shooter Records; Outside Music
- Member of: Early Winters
- Spouse: Sarah Keenleyside
- Website: justinrutledge.com

Justin John Rutledge (born January 3, 1979) is a Toronto-based Canadian alternative country singer-songwriter signed to Outside Music.

Rutledge's musical style is often compared to that of American alt-country singer Ryan Adams.

In 2006, Justin Rutledge was named Toronto singer-songwriter of the year by NOW magazine.

Rutledge has toured Canada, the UK, the United States, and Europe, and has played shows with Kathleen Edwards, Jim Cuddy, Blue Rodeo, Hawksley Workman, Luke Doucet, and Dolly Parton.

== Biography ==
=== Early life ===
Rutledge was born and grew up in the Junction neighbourhood of Toronto, a working-class community. He was raised in an Irish-Catholic family and grew up with aspirations of becoming a writer. To that end, he studied English literature, with a major in modern poetry, at the University of Toronto. He dropped out after three years of school, as his musical career got in the way. Rutledge told Maclean's in an interview that his backup plan would be to finish his university studies in English "if this music thing doesn't work".

=== No Never Alone (2004–2005) ===
No Never Alone is Rutledge's first album. To pay for its recording, he worked as a bartender. Rutledge has remarked that, "I would often do a studio session during the day and then head straight to work until 4 or 5 in the morning".

The album earned Rutledge considerable praise, particularly in the UK, where he was compared to Ryan Adams by Comes with a Smile, who also proclaimed that "A major new talent has landed". Additional UK praise came from Uncut magazine, who referred to Rutledge as "a master of gothic understatement", and NME describing the album as "an incredible breakthrough".

After gaining prominence in the UK, No Never Alone was released in Rutledge's native Canada.

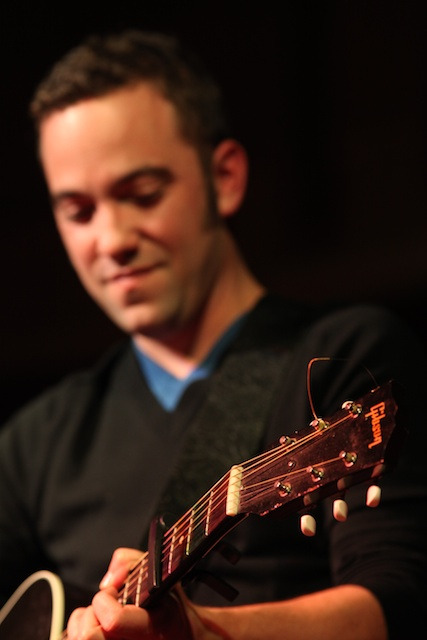
Justin Rutledge performing at Vancouver's St. James Community Square

=== The Devil on a Bench in Stanley Park (2006–2007) ===
Rutledge's second album, The Devil on a Bench in Stanley Park, was released through Six Shooter Records on October 6, 2006. The record is actually Rutledge's second attempt at a second album; he spent a year recording his first attempt, tentatively titled In the Fall, before he scrapped it. He was unsatisfied with the album and has explained, "I thought a second album should have just a bit more of an assured sense about it. A second step forward should be a step up the ladder as opposed to just asserting your presence. You're not just saying, "hey, I'm still here". You're saying, "hey I'm here and I've challenged myself and I've hopefully done something that I haven't done already". To challenge himself and create the album he wanted, Rutledge wrote a new batch of songs and recorded them in eight days with his band, opting for a more live recording style.

The Devil on a Bench in Stanley Park was nominated for a Juno Award in the category Roots & Traditional Album of the Year: Solo and received the Galaxie Rising Star Award at the Edmonton Folk Music Festival.

=== Man Descending (2008) ===
Rutledge's third album, Man Descending, was released on April 8, 2008, through Six Shooter Records. The record is named after a 1982 collection of short stories by Guy Vanderhaeghe, also called Man Descending. Rutledge was inspired by a line from Vanderhaeghe's book, "A man descending is propelled by inertia; the only initiative left him is whether or not he decides to enjoy the passing scene." He says of the line, "It really resonated with me. As I continued to read the stories, I realized that all these characters in the book were dealing with the same kind of static or inertia in their lives. I kind of took little threads and wove them into songs".

The album features guest performances by Ron Sexsmith, Jenn Grant, Catherine MacLellan, Hawksley Workman, Melissa McClelland, Joey Wright, and Jim Bryson.

Man Descending was longlisted for the Polaris Music Prize. Other praise for the album in 2008 included the No. 5 spot on Exclaim!'s Wood, Wires & Whiskey top 10 and a nomination for Contemporary Album of the Year at the Canadian Folk Music Awards.

According to an interview, "Compared to 2006's The Devil on a Bench in Stanley Park, Rutledge feels Man Descending is a much more patient, intimate and mature album, despite recording it in just three days".

The songs "Alberta Breeze" and "San Sebastian" were written for In the Fall, the album that Rutledge scrapped in 2006, and were rerecorded for Man Descending.

In 2009, Rutledge took part in an interactive documentary series called City Sonic. The series, which featured 20 Toronto artists, had him reflecting on his time performing at the Cameron House.

=== The Early Widows (2010) ===
The Early Widows is Rutledge's fourth album, released May 4, 2010, on Six Shooter Records. Rutledge wrote several songs with a single character in mind from author Michael Ondaatje's novel Divisadero after collaborating with Ondaatje on a theatrical adaptation of the novel. Ondaatje also co-wrote several of the songs, receiving official credit for the single "Be a Man".

The album was produced by Canadian singer-songwriter Hawksley Workman (also credited as a musician on the album) and also features Canadian singer-songwriter Oh Susanna and an additional co-writer credit to Nashville singer-songwriter Darrell Scott.

=== Valleyheart and subsequent albums (2013–present) ===
Valleyheart is Rutledge's fifth album, released February 2013 on his new label, Outside Music. The artist has since released further albums, including Daredevil (2014), East (2016), Passages (2019), Islands (2021), and Something Easy (2023).

In 2022, he appeared as a guest musician on Artefact, the debut album by the Canadian rock band Clever Hopes.

=== Early Winters ===
Rutledge is also a member of the band Early Winters, a collaboration with Canadian musician/producer Dan Burns, American musician Zac Rae, and British singer-songwriter Carina Round. The group has released three studio albums to date: Early Winters (2012), Vanishing Act (2014), and I Want to Break Your Heart (2017).

== Theatrical work ==
In addition to his recording career, Rutledge has also acted on stage, including in productions of Ondaatje's Divisadero and Sarah Ruhl's Eurydice. He also composed music and worked as musical director for a production of Max Frisch's The Arsonists.

== Personal life ==
Rutledge married designer Sarah Keenleyside, at the time the cohost of HGTV Canada's Backyard Builds, in 2018. They have two boys and live in Ontario's Prince Edward County.

Rutledge appears in numerous episodes of Keenleyside's 2026 HGTV series The County.

== Discography ==
=== Solo ===
- No Never Alone (2004)
- The Devil on a Bench in Stanley Park (2006)
- Man Descending (2008)
- The Early Widows (2010)
- Valleyheart (2013)
- Daredevil (2014)
- East (2016)
- Passages (2019)
- Islands (2021)
- Something Easy (2023)

=== with Early Winters ===
- Early Winters (2012)
- Vanishing Act (2014)
- I Want to Break Your Heart (2017)

=== Other credits ===
- Dean Drouillard, Dream at Harmony Motel – banjo (2005)
- Melissa McClelland, Thumbelina's One Night Stand – banjo/vocals (2006)
- Oh Susanna, Short Stories: "Schoolyard" – harmonica; "Pretty Penny" – banjo/harmony vocals (2007)
- The Roaring Girl Cabaret, In Last Night's Party Clothes – vocals (2008)
- NQ Arbuckle, XOK (2008)
- Kathleen Edwards, Asking for Flowers – backing vocals (2008)
