= Margaret Elizabeth Vanderhaeghe =

Canadian artist

- Born: Margaret Elizabeth Nagel; March 22, 1950; Leader, Saskatchewan
- Died: May 18, 2012 (aged 62); Saskatoon, Saskatchewan
- Education: University of Saskatchewan
- Known for: painter
- Awards: Canada 125 Medal

Margaret Elizabeth Vanderhaeghe (March 22, 1950 – May 18, 2012) was a Canadian artist. Her ancestors were Volksdeutsche, and much of her work was influenced by this community. She was known for her paintings, which often include themes of identity, memory and gender. She was married to Canadian writer Guy Vanderhaeghe on September 2, 1972.

== Career ==
Vanderhaeghe was born in Leader, Saskatchewan and received a Bachelor of Arts with a major in Art (1971) and a Bachelor of Arts (1972) from the University of Saskatchewan. She was a painting instructor at the Cypress Hills Community College in Swift Current, Saskatchewan in 1979. In 1992, she received the Canada 125 Medal for her contributions to the artistic community in Saskatchewan. In 2003, a documentary on her work was included in The Artist’s Life series and aired on Bravo.

Vanderhaeghe's work is represented in several collections, including the MacKenzie Art Gallery (Regina), the Saskatchewan Arts Board, the Mendel Art Gallery (Saskatoon), the City of Ottawa Corporate Collection, the University of Lethbridge Art Gallery, the University of Saskatchewan (Saskatoon), and Grant MacEwan College (Edmonton).

== Solo exhibitions ==
Selected solo exhibitions:

- 1984 – Recent Works. Assiniboia Gallery, Regina, Saskatchewan.
- 1988 – At Home in Our Own Skins. AKA Gallery, Saskatoon, Saskatchewan.

== Sources ==
- Margaret Elizabeth Vanderhaeghe Obituary. Saskatoon StarPhoenix. Retrieved 2016-03-05.
- Robertson, Sheila. (29 October 1983). "Priest Elevates Role of Polish." Star Phoenix. (Saskatoon).
- Robertson, Sheila. (24 September 1988). "Nine Artists Reveal How They've Grown." Star Phoenix (Saskatoon).
- Robertson, Sheila. (3 December 1988). "Paintings Reveal Dark Memories." Star Phoenix. (Saskatoon).
