= Sagapool =

- Origin: Montreal, Quebec, Canada
- Genres: Gypsy jazz jazz folk
- Years active: since 1999
- Labels: Anubis
- Members: Luzio Altobelli; Guillaume Bourque; Alexis Dumais; Zoe Dumais; Dany Nicolas; Marton Maderspach
- Past members: Liu Kong Ha; Daniel Gelinas; Loukas Sirois
- Website: sagapool.com

Sagapool is a gypsy jazz band from Montreal, Quebec. The band performs most often in Quebec. The six band members are Luzio Altobelli (accordion, drum, double bass), Guillaume Bourque (clarinet, bass clarinet), Alexis Dumais (piano, rhodes, double bass), Zoé Dumais (violin, glockenspiel), Dany Nicolas (guitar, banjo, double bass), and Marton Maderspach (drum, double bass).

== History ==
Sagapool was created in 1999 at the Conservatoire de musique du Québec à Montréal, and at that time was called Manouch. In 2002, the group released its first album, Apprenti Moustachu.

The band plays often in the province of Quebec; it has played many times at the Montreal International Jazz Festival, and at the Festi Jazz International de Rimouski, at the Festival de la Chanson de Tadoussac, and in many different places across Quebec. The band also played Ontario, in France and in the U.S., for the Blissfest in Michigan.

The band's second album, St-Urbain Cafe, was released in 2005; the album was nominated at the ADISQ for best instrumental album of the year in 2006, and that year the band received the ROSEQ-RADARTS discovery award.

In 2008, the name of the band was changed to Sagapool to reflect the more varied style of music that the band was playing. Sagapool was given the "Rising Star Award" for its performance at the ROSEQ that year. Also in 2008, they released a third album, Episode Trois, which was selected as album of the week by the Montreal weekly newspaper Ici, nominated at the GAMIQ for best world music album of the year, and then named "Instrumental album of the year" at the Canadian Folk Music Award in November 2008.

In 2012, Sagapool released its fourth album, Sagapool.

== Musical style ==
The musical influences of the band go from klezmer, gypsy and manouche to ska, folk, Latin, and jazz. Although inspired by some traditional songs, the band’s music is all original material and leaves a lot of room for improvisation.

== Discography ==
- Apprenti Moustachu (2002)
- St-Urbain Cafe (2005)
- Episode Trois (2008)
- Sagapool (2012)
