= Ladybird Sideshow =

Canadian band

Ladybird Sideshow is a Canadian folk/pop band. Members include Melissa McClelland, Janine Stoll, Erin Smith and Lisa Winn, all also solo artists, the first three from Toronto, Ontario.

== History ==
The four friends formed as a group in 2001 during a trip to the east coast. They toured through Canada and recorded the album Live at the Orange Lounge at the Orange Lounge in Toronto in September 2004. The album was released in December that year, and appeared soon after on local radio charts.

Smith moved to Maui, playing there with her band The Throwdowns, leaving the band a trio of McClelland, Stoll, and Winn. The three founded the animal rescue group Ladybird Animal Sanctuary, and continue to perform occasionally to raise funds for animal welfare causes.

== Discography ==
- 2004: Ladybird Sideshow Live at the Orange Lounge
