= New Country Rehab =

Canadian alternative country band

- Origin: Toronto, Ontario, Canada
- Genres: Alternative country
- Years active: 2010–present
- Members: John Showman; James Robertson; Ben Whiteley; Roman Tomé

New Country Rehab is a Canadian alternative country band. Based in Toronto, Ontario, the band consists of John Showman on vocals and fiddle, Anthony Da Costa on guitar, Ben Whiteley on bass, and Roman Tomé on drums. All four members are established session musicians in the Toronto area, who have played in supporting bands for artists including Basia Bulat, Justin Rutledge, and Amy Millan.

== History ==
New Country Rehab formed in 2007, and began performing music based on the songs of Hank Williams. They played in Toronto clubs, adapting familiar country and popular tunes with their own sound, a mix of country, pop, folk, and roots.

The band released its self-titled debut album on January 11, 2011, featuring songs written by Showman and Robertson along with some cover tunes.

The band later signed with Kelp Records, and released their second album, Ghost of Your Charms, in March 2013. The album contains some elements of pop and folk, and is a mixture of original material and cover tunes. They toured in Ontario and western Canada in support of the album, and in 2014 toured in the United States.

In 2015, the band received a grant from the Ontario Music Fund.

== Discography ==
- New Country Rehab (2011)
- Ghost of Your Charms (2013)
