= The Early Widows =

The Early Windows

Studio album by Justin Rutledge
- Released: May 4, 2010
- Genre: alternative country
- Label: Six Shooter Records
- Producer: Hawksley Workman

Justin Rutledge chronology
Man Descending (2008)	The Early Windows (2010)	Valleyheart (2013)

Singles from The Early Widows
- 1. "Be A Man" Released: 2010

The Early Widows is the fourth album by Canadian singer-songwriter Justin Rutledge, released on May 4, 2010 on Six Shooter Records. The album, produced by Canadian singer-songwriter Hawksley Workman, was recorded at The Woodshed, a recording studio owned by Canadian country-rock band Blue Rodeo. According to Rutledge, the songs are written with a single character in mind from the Michael Ondaatje novel Divisadero.

The album was a longlisted nominee for the 2010 Polaris Music Prize.

== Track listing ==
All tracks are written by Justin Rutledge, except where noted.

No.	Title	Length
1.	"Be a Man"
2.	"Jack of Diamonds"
3.	"Islands"
4.	"The Heart of a River"
5.	"I Have Not Seen the Light"
6.	"Turn Around"
7.	"Mrs. Montgomery"
8.	"Snowmen"
9.	"Carry On"
10.	"All Around This World"

Ondaatje contributed to the writing of several of the songs, and is credited as co-writer on the single "Be a Man".

The track "I Have Not Seen the Light" is co-written with Nashville singer-songwriter Darrell Scott.

== Personnel ==
- David Baxter – electric guitar
- Burke Carroll – pedal steel
- Gary Craig – Stew Crookes – tubular bells, electric guitar
- Bazil Donovan – bass
- Julie Fader – voice
- Blake Manning – drums, percussion
- Oh Susanna – voice
- Justin Rutledge – electric, acoustic and 12-string guitars, piano, wurlitzer, voice
- Hawksley Workman – electric guitar, piano, percussion
- Jesse Zubot – violin, viola, mandolin, soundscapes
- Amoy Levy, Nevon Sinclair, Sharon Riley – choir
