= Creaking Tree String Quartet =

Canadian bluegrass band

- Origin: Toronto, Ontario, Canada
- Genre: bluegrass music
- Years active: 2004–2011
- Members: John Showman; Andrew Collins; Brad Keller; Brian Kobayakawa

The Creaking Tree String Quartet is a Canadian progressive all-instrumental bluegrass and acoustic roots band from Toronto, Ontario, Canada.

In 2004, the Creaking Trees produced their debut album, The Creaking Trees, and it was promptly nominated for a Juno Award.

In February 2005, they performed at Glenn Gould Studio in Toronto in a combined concert with Beyond the Pale, blending bluegrass and klezmer music. That year their second album, Side Two, won a Canadian Folk Music Award and an Indie Acoustic Project award.

In 2007, the band performed at the Calgary Folk Music Festival. Their third album, The Sound Track, was released and won two Canadian Folk Music Awards and a Juno nomination.

In 2008, the Trees performed at the fifth annual Toronto CityFest. They set out on a tour of the US and western Canada, including a performance at the Vancouver Folk Music Festival.

By 2010, they had recorded and released their fourth album, Sundogs. Bryan Acker of HeroHill wrote, "it's how these seasoned TO players forge jazz, bluegrass, bebop, folk and traditional sounds into their own sound that makes the record so impressive."

Members of the Creaking Tree Quartet include John Showman on fiddle, Andrew Collins on mandolin, Brad Keller on guitar, and Brian Kobayakawa on bass.
