= Tannis Slimmon =

Canadian folk music singer-songwriter

Tannis Slimmon is a Canadian folk music singer-songwriter based in Guelph, Ontario. She is most noted for her 2008 album Lucky Blue, which won the Canadian Folk Music Award for Contemporary Album of the Year at the 4th Canadian Folk Music Awards.

Originally from Oak Lake, Manitoba, Slimmon began her musical career as a member of various bands in the Southwestern Ontario region, most notably the folk trio The Bird Sisters with Sue Smith and Jude Vadala, while also working as a laboratory supervisor for the University of Guelph. She also appeared as a backing vocalist on recordings by Barenaked Ladies, Rheostatics, Grievous Angels and Willie P. Bennett.

She released her debut solo album, Oak Lake, in 2001.

== Discography ==
- Oak Lake (2001)
- Lucky Blue (2008)
- In and Out of Harmony (2013)
