= Guy Vanderhaeghe =

Canadian writer (born 1951)

Guy Vanderhaeghe OC SOM
- Born: Guy Clarence Vanderhaeghe; April 5, 1951 (age 75); Esterhazy, Saskatchewan, Canada
- Education: University of Saskatchewan (BA, MA); University of Regina (BEd)
- Occupations: Novelist; short story writer; playwright
- Spouse: Margaret Elizabeth Vanderhaeghe
- Writing career
- Genres: Historical fiction; Western fiction; short stories
- Notable works: Man Descending; The Englishman's Boy; The Last Crossing; A Good Man; Daddy Lenin and Other Stories
- Notable awards: Governor General's Award for English-language fiction (1982, 1996, 2015); Saskatchewan Order of Merit (2003); Officer of the Order of Canada (2003)

Guy Clarence Vanderhaeghe OC SOM (born April 5, 1951) is a Canadian novelist and short story writer, best known for his Western novel trilogy, The Englishman's Boy, The Last Crossing, and A Good Man set in the 19th-century American and Canadian West. Vanderhaeghe has won three Governor General's Awards for his fiction, one for his short story collection Man Descending in 1982, the second for his novel The Englishman's Boy in 1996, and the third for his short story collection Daddy Lenin and Other Stories in 2015.

== Life and education ==
Guy Vanderhaeghe was born on April 5, 1951, in Esterhazy, a mining town in southeastern Saskatchewan.

He received his Bachelor of Arts degree with great distinction in 1971, High Honours in History in 1972 and Master of Arts in History in 1975, all from the University of Saskatchewan. In 1978 he received his Bachelor of Education with great distinction from the University of Regina.

== Career ==
In 1973 he was Research Officer, Institute for Northern Studies, University of Saskatchewan and, from 1974 until 1977, he worked as Archival and Library Assistant at the university.

From 1975 to 1977, he was a freelance writer and editor and in 1978 and 1979 taught English and history at Herbert High School in Herbert, Saskatchewan. In 1983 and 1984 he was Writer-in-Residence with the Saskatoon Public Library and in 1985 Writer-in-Residence at the University of Ottawa. He has been a Visiting Professor of Creative Writing at the University of Ottawa (1985–86), faculty member of the Writing Program of the Banff Centre for the Arts (1990–91), faculty member in charge of senior fiction students in the SAGE Hills Creative Writing Program (1992). Since 1993, he has served as a visiting professor of English at St. Thomas More College at the University of Saskatchewan.

His 2011 publication of A Good Man finished off his Western trilogy. "Historically spot on, the characters (fictional and real) are incredible, and the plot builds to an incredible bitter sweet ending."

His first novel in almost a decade was published in 2021, titled August Into Winter. Set in 1939 in a small prairie town, with a narcissistic man-child on the lam with a scrappy 12-year-old child/lover in tow and a trio of hardened lawmen on his trail.

== Personal life ==
Vanderhaeghe currently lives in Saskatoon. He teaches creative writing as an evening class at St. Thomas Moore College at the University of Saskatchewan. His wife Margaret Elizabeth Vanderhaeghe, a noted artist, died in 2012.

His short story collection Daddy Lenin and Other Stories was published in 2015, and won the Governor General's Award for English-language fiction at the 2015 Governor General's Awards.

== Awards and honours ==
=== Literary awards and shortlists ===
- Man Descending won the 1982 Governor General's Award for English-language fiction and the Faber Prize.
- The Englishman's Boy won the 1996 Governor General's Award for English-language fiction and the Saskatchewan Book Awards for Fiction and Best Book of the Year. It was shortlisted for the Giller Prize and the International Dublin Literary Award.
- The Last Crossing won the Saskatoon Book Award, the Saskatchewan Book Awards for Fiction and Book of the Year, and the Canadian Booksellers Association's Libris Award for Fiction Book of the Year. It won Canada Reads in 2004.
- Daddy Lenin and Other Stories won the 2015 Governor General's Award for English-language fiction.

=== Honours and lifetime achievement ===
- In 2003, Vanderhaeghe received the Saskatchewan Order of Merit and was appointed an Officer of the Order of Canada.
- In 2013, he received Saskatchewan's Lieutenant Governor's Arts Award for Lifetime Achievement in the Arts.

== Bibliography ==
=== Novels ===
- My Present Age (Toronto: Macmillan of Canada, 1984).
- Homesick (Toronto: McClelland & Stewart, 1989). ISBN 0771086911
- The Englishman's Boy (Toronto: McClelland & Stewart, 1996). ISBN 9780802144102
- The Last Crossing (Toronto: McClelland & Stewart, 2002).
- A Good Man (Toronto: McClelland & Stewart, 2011).
- August Into Winter (2021)

=== Short story collections ===
- Man Descending (Toronto: Macmillan of Canada, 1982). ISBN 9781551995687
- The Trouble With Heroes (Ottawa: Borealis Press, 1983).
- Things As They Are? (Toronto: McClelland & Stewart, 1992). ISBN 9781551995724
- Daddy Lenin and Other Stories (McClelland & Stewart, 2015). ISBN 9780771099151

=== Plays ===
- I Had a Job I Liked. Once. (Saskatoon: Fifth House, 1992).
- Dancock's Dance (Winnipeg: Blizzard Pub., 1996)
