= Mariam Matossian =

Canadian musician

- Born: Vancouver, British Columbia, Canada
- Genres: Folk music
- Website: Official website

Mariam Matossian (born in Vancouver, British Columbia, Canada) is a musician specialising in Armenian folk music.

== Early life and education ==
Her Armenian parents spoke their native language in their home, instilling in Matossian a love for Armenian music and culture.

As a young teenager, Matossian commenced over a decade of training in classical voice. After graduating from the University of British Columbia in 1995, she spent seven years as a high school instructor of English Literature and Language Arts, in addition to time as a counsellor.

In 1998 she became the first family member to travel to Armenia since her grandmother, a survivor of the Armenian genocide, had been deported c. 1915. While there, volunteering for an English-language newspaper, Matossian became informed of the overwhelming plight of Armenian street children. Her involvement with these children culminated in a 2002 leave of absence from her teaching career to work for three months with them.

== Musical career ==
Matossian's return from Armenia marked the beginning of her professional career as a musician. 2004 saw Matossian awarded with a Music/Career Development grant from the Canada Council for the Arts, providing her the means to release her debut recording, Far from Home, early the same year. Far from Home has enjoyed airplay across Canada, in the United States and Europe, and was selected in 2005 as one of John Diliberto’s 25 Essential Albums for Echoes radio program on NPR.

Matossian’s concerts have been recorded by the CBC and broadcast nationally across Canada. She has performed with the renowned oud master (Udi), John Berberian. Other acclaimed Canadian musicians such as Jesse Zubot, Ernie Tollar, Francois Houle, Elliot Polsky, and Catherine Potter rank among those with whom she has shared a stage.

In 2008 Matossian joined forces with the instrumental world fusion group Free Planet Radio, which includes River Guerguerian (percussion), Chris Rosser (cumbus, oud), and Grammy award winner, Eliot Wadiopian (acoustic bass). The group performs together to sold out crowds in southeast USA. Greenville News arts writer Ann Hicks calls Matossian "a rare, compelling artist who can spellbind any audience."

She currently resides in the United States.

== Awards and recognition ==
- 2008: Nominated for a Western Canadian Music Award (Outstanding World Music Album of the Year for In the Light)
- 2008: Nominated for a Canadian Folk Music Award (Traditional Album of the Year for In the Light)
- 2008: Nominated for a Canadian Folk Music Award (Best New/Emerging Artist)
- 2008: Named among KPFK’s "Best of 2008" for In the Light (by Yatrika Shah-Rais, Global Village)

== Discography ==
- Far From Home (2004)
- In the Light (2007)
