= Peter Katz (musician) =

Canadian singer-songwriter (born 1981)

Peter Simon Katz
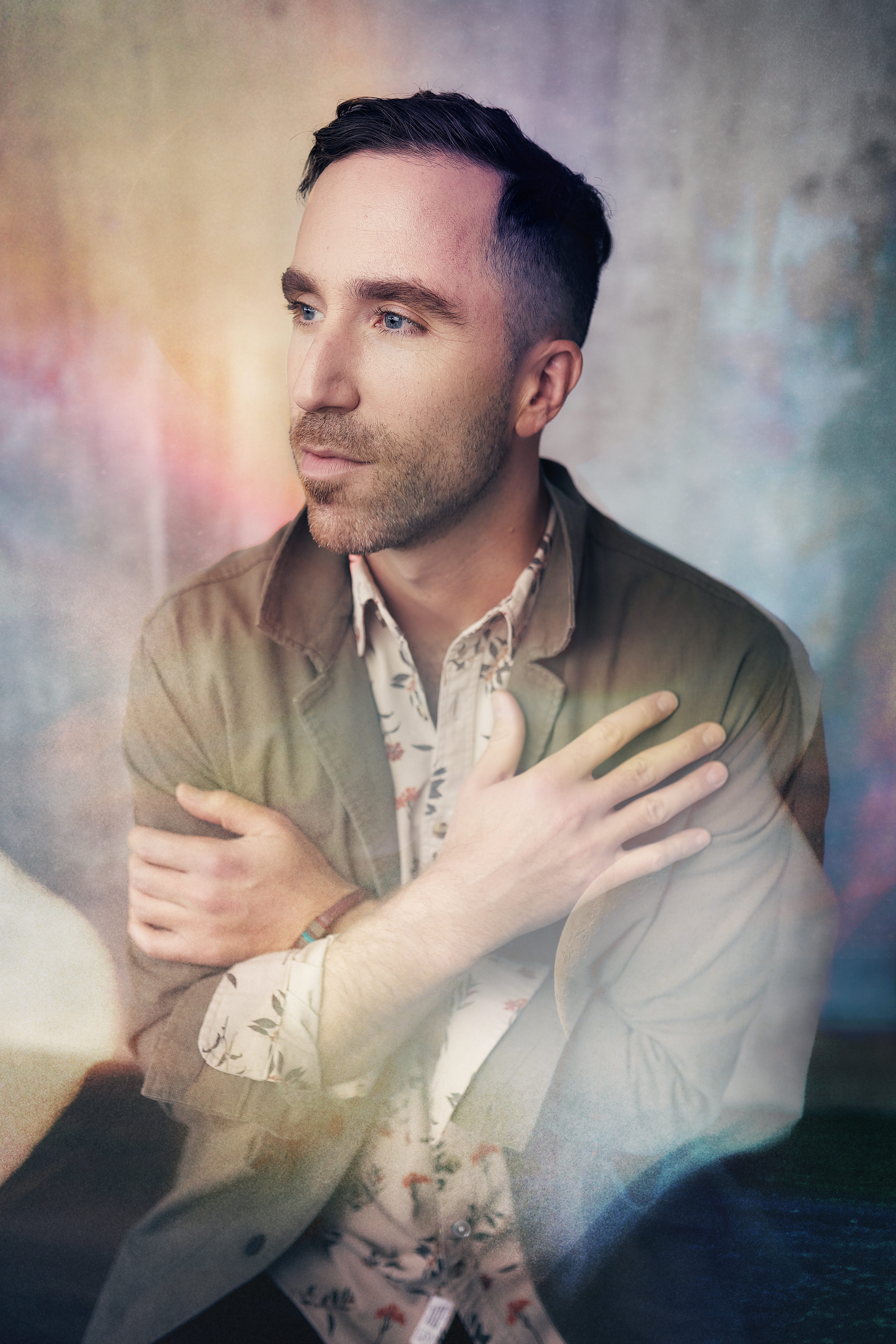

Background information
- Born: 26 December 1981 (age 44); Montreal, Quebec, Canada
- Genres: Folk
- Occupations: Musician, songwriter
- Instruments: Vocals, guitar, piano
- Years active: 2003–present
- Website: peterkatz.com peterkatzspeaks.com

Peter Katz is a Canadian singer-songwriter.

Katz is a 2012 Juno Award nominee and Emerging Artist of the Year nominee at the Canadian Folk Music Awards. Katz has sold over 15,000 copies of his discs and performed with artists such as The Swell Season (The Frames), Dan Mangan, The Good Lovelies, Joel Plaskett, Bahamas, Royal Wood, Lucky Fonz III, Donavon Frankenreiter, and Garth Hudson from The Band, members of Levon Helm's band (on stage with Glen Hansard's band).

Katz's 2010 studio record First of the Last to Know debuted at No. 1 on the iTunes singer-songwriter charts and features a guest appearance by Academy Award winner Glen Hansard (The Swell Season, 'Once'), Juno Award winners The Good Lovelies and Melissa McClelland (Whitehorse, Sarah Mclachlan). In 2011, Katz released a live CD/DVD entitled Peter Katz and Friends: Live at the Music Gallery. It earned him a Juno nomination for Music DVD of the Year.

Katz released a studio album called Still Mind Still on 24 April 2012. Recorded mostly live off the floor at a cabin in the woods, the album features the singles “Still Mind Still”, “Little One”, and “It Was You” (with Emma-Lee).

In 2015, Katz released We Are The Reckoning, produced by co-producers Royal Wood (multiple Juno Award Nominee) and Bill Lefler (Ingrid Michaelson, Cary Brothers), featuring the singles “We Are The Reckoning” and “Brother”, the latter of which was ranked #3 on CBC Radio 2’s Top 20 ‘Fan Favourites’ of 2015, #8 on the CBC Top 100 Most-Played Songs of 2015, and #55 on CBC Radio 2’s Top 100 Songs of 2015. In 2015, Katz released We Are The Reckoning, produced by co-producers Royal Wood (multiple Juno Award Nominee) and Bill Lefler (Ingrid Michaelson, Cary Brothers), featuring the singles “We Are The Reckoning” and “Brother”, the latter of which was ranked #3 on CBC Radio 2’s Top 20 ‘Fan Favourites’ of 2015, #8 on the CBC Top 100 Most-Played Songs of 2015, and #55 on CBC Radio 2’s Top 100 Songs of 2015. Renowned CBC Radio 2 radio host Tom Power called it “one of the most heartfelt, beautiful and vulnerable records of the year. The new Peter Katz is an astonishing record.”

Katz’s most recent release was 2020’s City of Our Lives, featuring the singles “Paper Thin,” “Like We Used to Be,” and “Take Mine.”

His newest studio album, Everything Unfolding, will be released in 2025.

Peter’s acoustic version of Beyoncé’s Halo has amassed more than 30 million views.

== Awards and nominations ==
=== Awards ===
- Best Male Vocalist 2014, Readers' Choice Awards (Now Magazine Toronto)

=== Nominations ===
- Juno Awards (41st Annual Juno Awards) Music DVD of the Year for Peter Katz & Friends: Live at The Music Gallery
- Canadian Folk Music Awards Emerging Artist of the Year Award

== Discography ==
=== Studio ===
- The One Minute Mile Man (2004)
- Split (2005)
- More Nights (2007) *Billed as Peter Katz & The Curious*
- First of the Last to Know (2010)
- Still Mind Still (2012)
- We Are the Reckoning (2015)
- La somme de tous nos efforts (2017)
- City of Our Lives (2020)

=== Live ===
- Peter Katz & Friends: Live at The Music Gallery CD/DVD (2011)

=== Singles ===
- The Camp Song (2008)

Note: Singer Peter Katz composed the lyrics and music for "The Camp Song"; this song is part of the song repertoire of many summer camps in Canada. This song was composed in 2008 for the International Camping Fellowship congress which took place in Quebec.

- Celebrate (May 16, 2025)
- Keep Breathing (April 15, 2025)
- Lean On (Major Lazer Cover) (April 28, 2023)
- Bringing Down the Walls (February 10, 2023)
- Calm Within the Storm (March 23, 2021)
- Halo (Beyonce cover) (October 6, 2016)
- Sunday Call (July 15, 2016)
- Sorry (Justin Bieber Cover) (February 26, 2016)
- Where The Light Used to Be (From the Movie 88) (February 26, 2016)
- Peter Katz & Friends: Live at The Music Gallery CD/DVD (2011)
