= Canadian Folk Music Award for Contemporary Album of the Year =

Annual music award

The Canadian Folk Music Award for Contemporary Album of the Year is an annual music award, presented by the Canadian Folk Music Awards to honour the best albums in contemporary folk music by Canadian artists.

== 2000s ==
Year	Nominee	Album	Ref
2005; 1st Canadian Folk Music Awards
2005; 1st Canadian Folk Music Awards	Nathan	Jimson Weed	
2005; 1st Canadian Folk Music Awards	The Bills	Let 'Em Run	
2005; 1st Canadian Folk Music Awards	The Clumsy Lovers	Smart Kid	
2005; 1st Canadian Folk Music Awards	David Francey	Waking Hour	
2005; 1st Canadian Folk Music Awards	Jenny Whiteley	Hopetown	
2006; 2nd Canadian Folk Music Awards
2006; 2nd Canadian Folk Music Awards	Penny Lang	Stone & Sand & Sea & Sky	
2006; 2nd Canadian Folk Music Awards	Jim Byrnes	House of Refuge	
2006; 2nd Canadian Folk Music Awards	Bruce Cockburn	Life Short Call Now	
2006; 2nd Canadian Folk Music Awards	Corb Lund	Hair in My Eyes Like a Highland Steer	
2006; 2nd Canadian Folk Music Awards	The Wailin' Jennys	Firecracker	
2007; 3rd Canadian Folk Music Awards
2007; 3rd Canadian Folk Music Awards	The Duhks	Migrations	
2007; 3rd Canadian Folk Music Awards	Jim Bryson	Where the Bungalows Roam	
2007; 3rd Canadian Folk Music Awards	David Francey	Right of Passage	
2007; 3rd Canadian Folk Music Awards	Oh Susanna	Short Stories	
2007; 3rd Canadian Folk Music Awards	Jenny Whiteley	Dear	
2008; 4th Canadian Folk Music Awards
2008; 4th Canadian Folk Music Awards	Luke Doucet and the White Falcon	Blood's Too Rich	
2008; 4th Canadian Folk Music Awards	Annabelle Chvostek	Resilience	
2008; 4th Canadian Folk Music Awards	NQ Arbuckle	XOK	
2008; 4th Canadian Folk Music Awards	Justin Rutledge	Man Descending	
2008; 4th Canadian Folk Music Awards	Oliver Schroer	Hymns and Hers	
2009; 5th Canadian Folk Music Awards
2009; 5th Canadian Folk Music Awards	Joel Plaskett	Three	
2009; 5th Canadian Folk Music Awards	Jim Byrnes	My Walking Stick	
2009; 5th Canadian Folk Music Awards	Great Lake Swimmers	Lost Channels	
2009; 5th Canadian Folk Music Awards	Romi Mayes	Achin in Yer Bones	
2009; 5th Canadian Folk Music Awards	Ndidi Onukwulu	The Contradictor	

== 2010s ==
Year	Nominee	Album	Ref
2010; 6th Canadian Folk Music Awards
2010; 6th Canadian Folk Music Awards	John Wort Hannam	Queen's Hotel	
2010; 6th Canadian Folk Music Awards	Amelia Curran	Hunter, Hunter	
2010; 6th Canadian Folk Music Awards	Dala	Girls from the North Country	
2010; 6th Canadian Folk Music Awards	Lennie Gallant	If We Had A Fire / Le coeur hante	
2010; 6th Canadian Folk Music Awards	Old Man Luedecke	My Hands Are on Fire and Other Love Songs	
2011; 7th Canadian Folk Music Awards
2011; 7th Canadian Folk Music Awards	Bruce Cockburn	Small Source of Comfort	
2011; 7th Canadian Folk Music Awards	Les Charbonniers de l'enfer	Nouvelles fréquentations	
2011; 7th Canadian Folk Music Awards	The Good Lovelies	Let The Rain Fall	
2011; 7th Canadian Folk Music Awards	Lynn Miles	Fall for Beauty	
2011; 7th Canadian Folk Music Awards	Twilight Hotel	When the Wolves Go Blind	
2012; 8th Canadian Folk Music Awards
2012; 8th Canadian Folk Music Awards	The Deep Dark Woods	The Place I Left Behind	
2012; 8th Canadian Folk Music Awards	Rose Cousins	We Have Made a Spark	
2012; 8th Canadian Folk Music Awards	Old Man Luedecke and Lake of Stew	Sing All About It	
2012; 8th Canadian Folk Music Awards	Linda McRae	Rough Edges and Ragged Hearts	
2012; 8th Canadian Folk Music Awards	Whitehorse	Whitehorse	
2013; 9th Canadian Folk Music Awards
2013; 9th Canadian Folk Music Awards	Justin Rutledge	Valleyheart	
2013; 9th Canadian Folk Music Awards	Annabelle Chvostek	Rise	
2013; 9th Canadian Folk Music Awards	David Francey	So Say We All	
2013; 9th Canadian Folk Music Awards	Lynn Miles	Downpour	
2013; 9th Canadian Folk Music Awards	Ruth Moody	These Wilder Things	
2014; 10th Canadian Folk Music Awards
2014; 10th Canadian Folk Music Awards	The Strumbellas	We Still Move on Dance Floors	
2014; 10th Canadian Folk Music Awards	Matt Andersen	Weightless	
2014; 10th Canadian Folk Music Awards	The Bros. Landreth	Let it Lie	
2014; 10th Canadian Folk Music Awards	Colleen Rennison	See the Sky About to Rain	
2014; 10th Canadian Folk Music Awards	Jill Zmud	Small Matters of Life and Death	
2015; 11th Canadian Folk Music Awards
2015; 11th Canadian Folk Music Awards	Catherine MacLellan	The Raven's Sun	
2015; 11th Canadian Folk Music Awards	Jon Brooks	The Smiling and Beautiful Countryside	
2015; 11th Canadian Folk Music Awards	Jenn Grant	Compostela	
2015; 11th Canadian Folk Music Awards	The Once	Departures	
2015; 11th Canadian Folk Music Awards	Gabrielle Papillon	The Tempest of Old	
2016; 12th Canadian Folk Music Awards
2016; 12th Canadian Folk Music Awards	David Francey	Empty Train	
2016; 12th Canadian Folk Music Awards	Big Little Lions	Just Keep Moving	
2016; 12th Canadian Folk Music Awards	Corin Raymond	Hobo Jungle Fever Dreams	
2016; 12th Canadian Folk Music Awards	The Strumbellas	Hope	
2016; 12th Canadian Folk Music Awards	Donovan Woods	Hard Settle, Ain't Troubled	
2017; 13th Canadian Folk Music Awards
2017; 13th Canadian Folk Music Awards	Abigail Lapell	Hide Nor Hair	
2017; 13th Canadian Folk Music Awards	The Fretless	Bird's Nest	
2017; 13th Canadian Folk Music Awards	Tomato Tomato	I Go Where You Go	
2017; 13th Canadian Folk Music Awards	Braden Gates	Much Rather Be Sleeping	
2017; 13th Canadian Folk Music Awards	Leif Vollebekk	Twin Solitude	
2018; 14th Canadian Folk Music Awards
2018; 14th Canadian Folk Music Awards	Donovan Woods	Both Ways	
2018; 14th Canadian Folk Music Awards	Dave Gunning and J.P. Cormier	Two	
2018; 14th Canadian Folk Music Awards	The Lynnes	Heartbreak Song for the Radio	
2018; 14th Canadian Folk Music Awards	Gabrielle Papillon	Keep the Fire	
2018; 14th Canadian Folk Music Awards	The Wailin' Jennys	Fifteen	

== 2020s ==
Year	Nominee	Album	Ref
2020; 15th Canadian Folk Music Awards
2020; 15th Canadian Folk Music Awards	The Small Glories	Assiniboine & The Red	
2020; 15th Canadian Folk Music Awards	Lennie Gallant	Time Travel	
2020; 15th Canadian Folk Music Awards	Ariana Gillis	The Maze	
2020; 15th Canadian Folk Music Awards	Jenn Grant	Love, Inevitable	
2020; 15th Canadian Folk Music Awards	Dave Gunning	Up Against the Sky	
2020; 15th Canadian Folk Music Awards	Abigail Lapell	Getaway	
2020; 15th Canadian Folk Music Awards	Leaf Rapids	Citizen Alien	
2020; 15th Canadian Folk Music Awards	Various Artists	The Al Purdy Songbook	
2021; 16th Canadian Folk Music Awards
2021; 16th Canadian Folk Music Awards	William Prince	Reliever	
2021; 16th Canadian Folk Music Awards	Basia Bulat	Are You in Love?	
2021; 16th Canadian Folk Music Awards	The Dead South	Sugar & Joy	
2021; 16th Canadian Folk Music Awards	The East Pointers	Yours to Break	
2021; 16th Canadian Folk Music Awards	Stephen Fearing	The Unconquerable Past	
2021; 16th Canadian Folk Music Awards	Catherine MacLellan	Coyote	
2021; 16th Canadian Folk Music Awards	Mike McKenna Jr.	At the Edge of the World	
2021; 16th Canadian Folk Music Awards	Joe Nolan	Drifters	
2022; 17th Canadian Folk Music Awards
2022; 17th Canadian Folk Music Awards	Allison Russell	Outside Child	
2022; 17th Canadian Folk Music Awards	Beyries	Encounter	
2022; 17th Canadian Folk Music Awards	Craig Cardiff	All This Time Running	
2022; 17th Canadian Folk Music Awards	Rick Fines	Solar Powered Too	
2022; 17th Canadian Folk Music Awards	David Leask	Voyageur in Song	
2022; 17th Canadian Folk Music Awards	Rob Lutes	Come Around	
2022; 17th Canadian Folk Music Awards	Ryland Moranz	XO, 1945	
2022; 17th Canadian Folk Music Awards	Reney Ray	À l'ouest du réel	
2023; 18th Canadian Folk Music Awards
2023; 18th Canadian Folk Music Awards	John Wort Hannam	Long Haul	
2023; 18th Canadian Folk Music Awards	Shawna Caspi	Hurricane Coming	
2023; 18th Canadian Folk Music Awards	Digging Roots	Zhawenim	
2023; 18th Canadian Folk Music Awards	Madison Violet	eleven	
2023; 18th Canadian Folk Music Awards	Kyle McKearney	Down-Home	
2023; 18th Canadian Folk Music Awards	Sultans of String	Sanctuary	
2023; 18th Canadian Folk Music Awards	Tanya Tagaq	Tongues	
2023; 18th Canadian Folk Music Awards	Ken Yates	Cerulean	
2024; 19th Canadian Folk Music Awards
2024; 19th Canadian Folk Music Awards	William Prince	Stand in the Joy	
2024; 19th Canadian Folk Music Awards	Jill Barber	Homemaker	
2024; 19th Canadian Folk Music Awards	The East Pointers	House of Dreams	
2024; 19th Canadian Folk Music Awards	Lynn Miles	TumbleWeedyWorld	
2024; 19th Canadian Folk Music Awards	Tami Neilson	Kingmaker	
2024; 19th Canadian Folk Music Awards	NQ Arbuckle	Love Songs for the Long Game	
2024; 19th Canadian Folk Music Awards	The Sadies	Colder Streams	
2024; 19th Canadian Folk Music Awards	Terra Spencer, Ben Caplan	Old News	
2025; 20th Canadian Folk Music Awards
2025; 20th Canadian Folk Music Awards	Boy Golden	For Jimmy	
2025; 20th Canadian Folk Music Awards	Sandra Bouza	A Sound in the Dark	
2025; 20th Canadian Folk Music Awards	Lynne Hanson	Just a Poet	
2025; 20th Canadian Folk Music Awards	Juurini	Aqqutinni	
2025; 20th Canadian Folk Music Awards	Kaia Kater	Strange Medicine	
2025; 20th Canadian Folk Music Awards	Abigail Lapell	Anniversary	
2026; 21st Canadian Folk Music Awards
2026; 21st Canadian Folk Music Awards	AHI	The Light Behind the Sun	
2026; 21st Canadian Folk Music Awards	Boreal	Winterbirds	
2026; 21st Canadian Folk Music Awards	The Fretless	Glasswing	
2026; 21st Canadian Folk Music Awards	Claire Morrison	Where Do You Go at Night?	
2026; 21st Canadian Folk Music Awards	Sacred Wolf Singers and Simon Walls	L’nu’k Mawiejik	
