= 20th Canadian Folk Music Awards =

2025 music awards ceremony

- Date: April 3-6, 2025
- Location: National Arts Centre; Ottawa, Ontario
- Country: Canada
- Website: folkawards.ca

The 20th Canadian Folk Music Awards were presented from April 3 to 6, 2025, at the National Arts Centre in Ottawa, Ontario. Nominations were announced in October 2024. The event was presented as a series of concerts over four nights to mark the event's anniversary, with some awards presented each night.

== Nominees and recipients ==
Traditional Album	Contemporary Album
Lucy MacNeil, Angels Whisper; La Bottine Souriante, Domino!; David Francey, The Breath Between; Brandon Isaak, One Step Closer; Bradley Murphy, BEUL; Rum Ragged, Gone Jiggin'	Boy Golden, For Jimmy; Sandra Bouza, A Sound in the Dark; Lynne Hanson, Just a Poet; Juurini, Aqqutinni; Kaia Kater, Strange Medicine; Abigail Lapell, Anniversary
Children's Album	Traditional Singer
Abigail Lapell, Lullabies; Bon Débarras, J'm'en viens chez vous!; Henri Godon, Chants de vacances; Seeka Sings, I Belong; Will and Seeka, Will and Seeka: Friends with Everyone	Lucy MacNeil, Angels Whisper; Fathieh Honari, Gordon Grdina's The Marrow with Fatheih Honari; Abigail Lapell, Lullabies; Ken Whiteley, So Glad I'm Here; Mélisande, Rembobine
Contemporary Singer	Instrumental Solo Artist
Jeffery Straker, Great Big Sky; Derina Harvey, Waves of Home; Camille Intson, Poems in the Ashes; Ndidi Onukwulu, Simple Songs for Complicated Times; Esther Wheaton, Foul Weather Friends	Jeremie Groleau, Uphill; Shaun Ferguson, La Lumière de l'ombre, l'ombre de la lumière; Jason Fowler, Forelsket; Merrie Klazek, Dance Around the Sun; Miles Zurawell, Far Afield
Instrumental Group	English Songwriter
Tio Chorinho, Tempestuoso; The Andrew Collins Trio, The Rule of Three; Masmoudi Quartette, Villes éternelles; Pipeslinger, The King's Clothing; Solidaridad Tango, Distancia	Ruth Moody, Wanderer; Celeigh Cardinal and Brennan Cameron, Boundless Possibilities; Adrian Glynn and Brendan McLeod (The Fugitives), No Help Coming; Shaina Hayes, Kindergarten Heart; Kellie Loder, Transitions; Ndidi Onukwulu, Simple Songs for Complicated Times
French Songwriter	Indigenous Songwriter
Alexandre Poulin, La somme des êtres aimés; Sara Dufour and Dany Placard, On va-tu prendre une marche?; Lennie Gallant and Patricia Richard (Sirène et Matelot), Un monde de dissonances; Reney Ray, L'Album temporaire; Michel Robichaud, Rallumer l'effort	Alan Syliboy and the Thundermakers, Marks on the Ground; Celeigh Cardinal, Boundless Possibilities; Jason Burnstick and Nadia Burnstick, Made of Sin; Gabrielle Fontaine (Indian City), Tomorrow; Mimi O'Bonsawin, Live in Concert
Vocal Group	Ensemble
The Good Lovelies, We Will Never Be the Same; La Nef, Red Sky at Night; Mikha.elles, Camino de mujeres; Prairie Comeau, L'emprunt(e); summersets, small town story	Rum Ragged, Gone Jiggin'; Rachel Davis and Darren McMullen, Home; The Fugitives, No Help Coming; The Good Lovelies, We Will Never Be the Same; Sultans of String, Walking Through the Fire
Solo Artist	Global Roots Album
Loryn Taggart, The Lost Art of Pulling Through; Sue Foley, One Guitar Woman; Connie Kaldor, Keep Going; Abigail Lapell, Anniversary; Mélisande, Rembobine; Orit Shimoni, Winnipeg	Okavango African Orchestra, Migration; Dumai Dunai, Sometime Between Now and Never; Merrie Klazek, Dance Around the Sun; Lemon Bucket Orkestra, Cuckoo; Jason Wilson and Ashara, Ashara
Single of the Year	New/Emerging Artist
Loryn Taggart, "Tell Me How"; Andrew Allen, "What Would Love Do? (Alt Version)"; Angelique Francis, "Train Coming (ft. Eric Gales)"; Asiah Holm, "Wildflower"; Mia Kelly, "Meaning Well"; Geneviève Racette, "Same Old Me"	Maggie's Wake, Maggie's Wake; Rachel Davis and Darren McMullen, Home; Derina Harvey, Waves of Home; Lucy MacNeil, Angels Whisper; Solidaridad Tango, Distancia; Miles Zurawell, Far Afield
Producer	Pushing the Boundaries
Joshua Van Tassel and Christine Bougie — The Good Lovelies, We Will Never Be the Same; Vincent Appelby — Marie Onile, Les mots, l'élan et la chance; David Boulanger — La Bottine Souriante, Domino!; Jason Burnstick and Nadia Burnstick — Burnstick, Made of Sin; Gal George Gjurin — Gal George Gjurin, How about a kiss?	Kiran Ahluwalia, Comfort Food; The Andrew Collins Trio, The Rule of Three; Jonathan Bélanger, Sur le boulevard; Irish Millie, Grace; James Hill, Uke Heads; Nastasia Y, Kyiv Soul
Instrumental Composer	Young Performer
Alanna Jenish, Daleview; Andrew Collins (The Andrew Collins Trio), The Rule of Three; Pastelle LeBlanc (Vishtèn), Expansion; Karson McKeown, Tom Gammons and Tuli Porcher (Inn Echo), Hemispheres; Andre Valerio (Tio Chorinho), Tempestuoso	Mary Frances Leahy, First Light; Irish Millie, Grace; Amelia Parker, Forwards; Paige Penney, Infinity; The Salt Beef Junkies, Somewhere in Between
