= The Coast Is Clear =

The Coast Is Clear may refer to:

- The Coast Is Clear (In-Flight Safety album)
- The Coast Is Clear (Tracy Lawrence album), or its title track
- "Coast Is Clear", a song by Skrillex featuring Chance The Rapper and The Social Experiment from Recess
- Coast Is Clear , 2022 album by American rock band Outline in Color
