= Còig =

Canadian folk music group

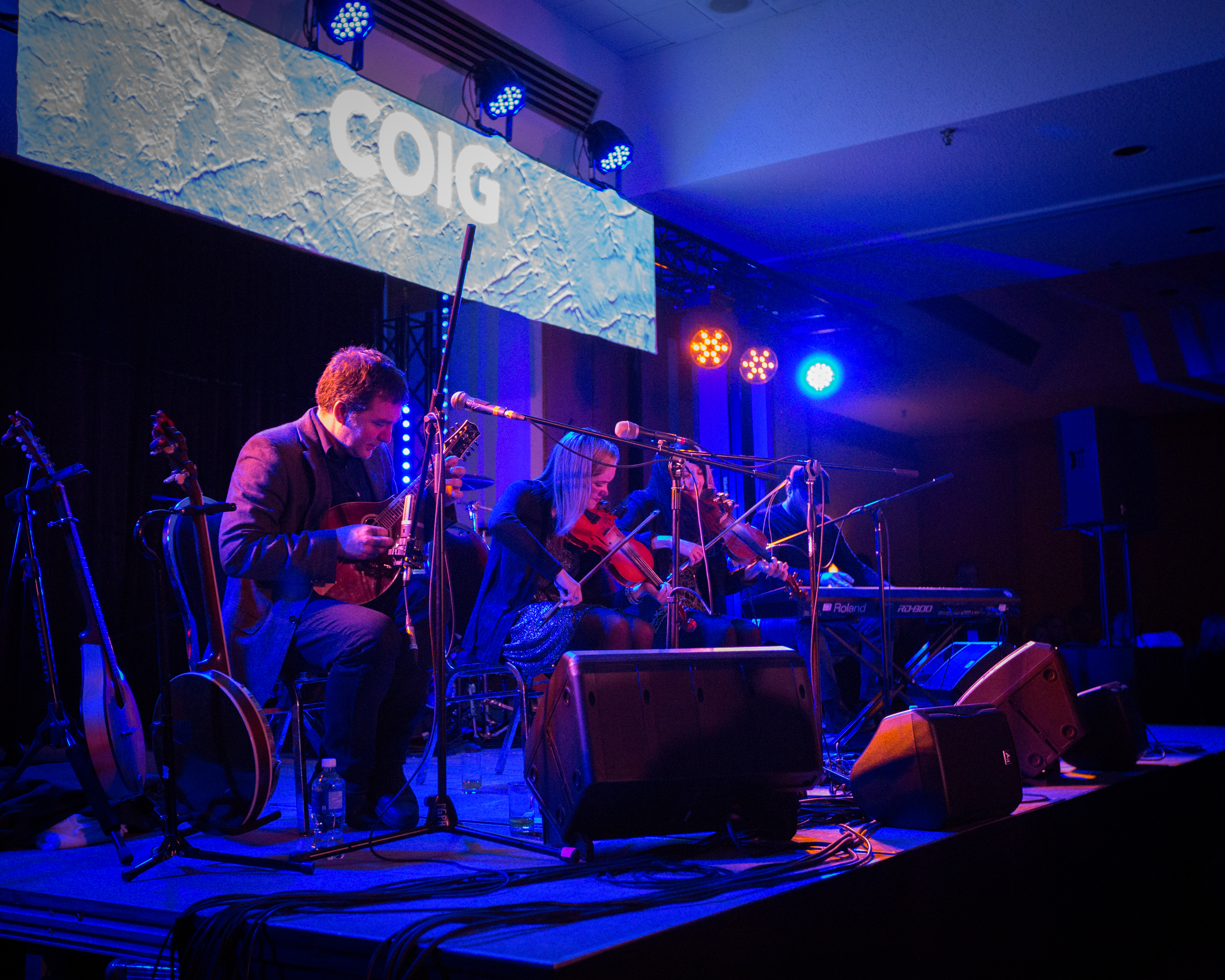
Còig performing at the 2016 Coldsnap Festival, Prince George, British Columbia. Pictured from left are McMullen, Davis, Crowley, and Roach.

Còig is a Canadian folk music quartet from Cape Breton Island, Nova Scotia. The group consists of Darren McMullen (guitar, mandolin, mandola, tenor banjo, bouzouki, whistles, flute and vocals), Rachel Davis (fiddle, viola and vocals), Jason Roach (keyboards and piano) and Chrissy Crowley (fiddle and viola).

== History ==
Còig was formed in 2010 after being invited to perform at Celtic Colours, a well-known annual fall music festival held every October on Cape Breton Island. The band would perform at the festival again in both 2017 and 2018.

Upon its creation in 2010, the band had been a quintet featuring a third fiddler, Colin Grant. The group released their debut album, Five (2014), four years later. The record, which included new arrangements and settings of traditional tunes, was nominated for (and won) the Traditional Album of the Year at the 10th Canadian Folk Music Awards. They followed this with Carols (2015), an album of Celtic-inspired Christmas music.

The band released their sophomore album, Rove, in 2017, earning nominations for Traditional Album of the Year at the 13th Canadian Folk Music Awards and Traditional Roots Album of the Year at the 2018 Juno Awards; the group also performed at the 2018 East Coast Music Awards (ECMAs), where they won their nomination for Roots/Traditional Recording of the Year. By the end of 2018, fiddler Grant had departed from the group.
