= The East Pointers =

Canadian contemporary folk music group

- The East Pointers performing at WOMADelaide, Australia, March 2017 (Left: Tim Chaisson, Middle: Koady Chaisson, Right: Jake Charron)

Background information
- Origin: Prince Edward Island, Canada
- Genre: Indie folk
- Years active: 2014–present
- Label: Nettwerk
- Members: Tim Chaisson; Jake Charron
- Past members: Koady Chaisson

The East Pointers are a Canadian contemporary folk music group from Prince Edward Island, who won the Juno Award for Traditional Roots Album of the Year for their album Secret Victory at the Juno Awards of 2017. The group initially consisted of guitarist Jake Charron, banjoist Koady Chaisson (d. 2022), and fiddler Tim Chaisson. They perform Celtic-influenced original songs and instrumentals with contemporary influences.

== History ==
The three musicians formed The East Pointers in 2014. They began performing in Atlantic Canada and toured Ontario after gaining popularity in Canada's eastern provinces. They released their debut album, Secret Victory, in late 2015 and promoted it with concert performances in Canada, the United States, and Australia. They won the Canadian Folk Music Award for Ensemble of the Year at the 12th Canadian Folk Music Awards in 2016, and were nominated for Instrumental Group of the Year. In 2017, they performed in the United Kingdom. The band was nominated again for a Canadian Folk Music Award as Ensemble of the Year in 2018.

In 2020, during the COVID-19 pandemic in Canada, the band coordinated weekly livestreamed "#Annedemic" readings of Anne of Green Gables, with guest readers reading one chapter of the novel each week. Koady Chaisson read the first chapter; guest readers over the rest of the series included Anthony Field, Catherine MacLellan, Jenn Grant, Daniel Ledwell, Patrick Ledwell, Irish Mythen, Laura Cortese, Miranda Mulholland, Colin MacDonald of The Trews, Graham Wardle, Jonathan Torrens, and Megan Follows.

In 2021, the band's song Wintergreen was used as the theme song for the Acorn TV show Under the Vines.

Koady Chaisson died suddenly in January 2022 of an ascending aortic aneurysm. It was important for the band that the public know that it was not a mental health crisis; Koady had put extensive work into healing his earlier mental health challenges.

The East Pointers released their JUNO-nominated EP "House Of Dreams" in September 2022 and their follow-up EP "Safe In Sound" in November 2023.

== Members ==
- Tim Chaisson (vocals, fiddle),
- Jake Charron (guitar, synthesizer)

== Former Members ==
- Koady Chaisson (tenor banjo, tenor guitar, synthesizer) (died January 6, 2022)

== Discography ==
=== Studio albums ===
- Secret Victory (2015)
- What We Leave Behind (2017)
- Yours to Break (2019)
- House of Dreams (EP) (2022)
- Safe In Sound (2023)
- Schoonertown (2026)

=== Singles ===
- 82 Fires/Tanglewood (2017)
- Wintergreen (2019)
- Halfway Tree (2019)
- Elmira - Remix with Lonely Kid (2020)
- Stronger Than You Know (2022)
- I Saw Your Ghost (2022)
- Save Your Lonely (2022)
- When I Had You (Chilled) (2023)
- Stronger Than You Know (Chilled) (2023)
- Goolaholla (2023)
- Best Surprise (2023)
- We Will Meet Again (2023)
- Feeling of Home (2023)
- It's the Most Wonderful Time of the Year (2023)
- I Want You (2023)
- Anniversary (2025
- Maritime Moonshine (2025)
- Misty Morning (2025)
- Undercover (2025)
- Rafters (2025)
