= Songs for Siigoun =

EP by Jenn Grant
- Released: 2010
- Genre: pop

Jenn Grant chronology
Echoes (2009)	Songs for Siigoun (2010)	Honeymoon Punch (2011)

Songs for Siigoun is an EP by Canadian singer-songwriter Jenn Grant, released in 2010. The EP, originally recorded as a gift for her fiancé Daniel Ledwell's newborn niece Siigoun, was released to online music stores such as iTunes, as well as in a limited edition CD version with individually hand-painted covers, which was sold exclusively at Grant's live shows.

The EP features covers of John Denver's "Annie's Song" and Tanya Davis' "Gorgeous Morning", as well as two original songs.

== Track listing ==
1. "Annie's Song"
2. "Back to the Country"
3. "Gorgeous Morning"
4. "Let's Get Started"
