= The Beautiful Wild =

Studio album by Jenn Grant
- Released: September 25, 2012
- Genre: pop
- Label: Six Shooter Records
- Producer: Daniel Ledwell

Jenn Grant chronology
Honeymoon Punch (2011)	The Beautiful Wild (2012)	Clairvoyant (2014)

The Beautiful Wild is the fourth studio album by Canadian singer-songwriter Jenn Grant, released September 25, 2012 on Six Shooter Records. The album was inspired in part by Grant's mother, who was suffering from a terminal illness during the album's recording.

The album was produced by Grant's husband, Daniel Ledwell. Guest musicians on the album include Ledwell, Erin Costello, Old Man Luedecke, Tanya Davis and Rose Cousins.

The album won the East Coast Music Award for Pop Recording of the Year in 2013.

== Track listing ==
1. "Introduction"
2. "The Fighter"
3. "I've Got Your Fire"
4. "I Want You Back"
5. "Hollywood"
6. "Gone Baby Gone"
7. "White Dove"
8. "One More Night"
9. "Aida"
10. "Michael"
11. "In the Belly of a Dragon"
12. "Green Grows the Lilac"
