= Don Brownrigg =

Canadian singer-songwriter

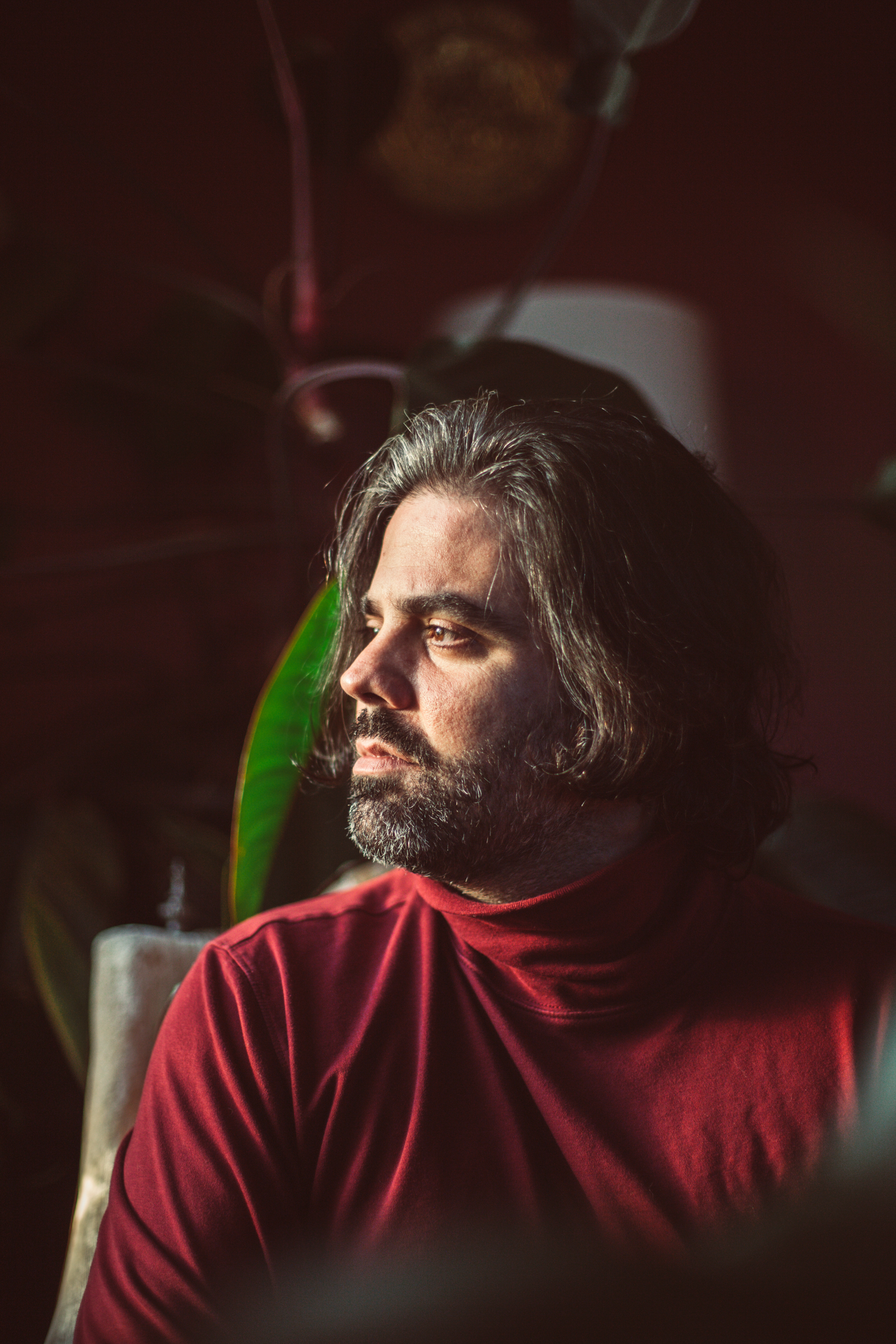

Background information
- Born: Newfoundland
- Origin: Canada
- Genres: Singer-songwriter
- Occupation: Musician
- Instruments: Voice, guitar, piano
- Years active: 2005–present
- Labels: (weewerk), Maple Music
- Website: www.donbrownrigg.com

Don Brownrigg is a Canadian singer-songwriter from Codroy Valley, Newfoundland and Labrador. and has spent much of his career based in Halifax, Nova Scotia. He has released 3 full-length albums, several singles, many collaborations, and has worked in theatre and puppetry. The Coast, Halifax's alt-weekly, said Brownrigg is "instrumental to the Haligonian arts community".

== Early life ==
Brownrigg was raised in Upper Ferry in Codroy Valley. He is part of the MacArthur Family who settled in the area in the 19th century. His paternal great-grandfather is Henry J. Brownrigg.

== Career ==
In 2007, Brownrigg self-produced and released his debut full-length album, Wander Songs. The album features Jenn Grant, Jim Bryson, and a duet with poet Tanya Davis. In 2008, (weewerk) re-released the album and it went on to receive rave reviews and accomplishments and Brownrigg was nominated for the 'Best New Artist' and 'Best Folk Album' categories at the 2008 East Coast Music Awards.

In 2013, Brownrigg released his second full-length album, It Takes All Kinds (to make this world, I find), with Maple Music. The album was produced by Daniel Ledwell and its songs went on to be featured in American Idol, The Blacklist, and The Fosters. The lead-single 'Sweet Dream Sleeper' had chart and playlist success and the song 'Just Breathe' became one of the 'Most Shazam-ed TV Songs' as compiled by The Hollywood Reporter and Neilson Music

In 2019, Brownrigg released his third full-length album, Fireworks. Besides drums and violin/viola, all of the instrumentation on the album is provided by Brownrigg and the album's producer, Daniel Ledwell. The album features a cover of Suzanne Vega's Tom's Diner. Brownrigg was tied for the most nominations at the 2019 Nova Scotia Music Awards and received an East Coast Music Award nomination for Music Video of the Year for co-directing 'Room for Me', the video for the album's lead single.

In 2022, Brownrigg released the singles 'The Same Time', 'The Same Time (Remix)', and 'Sweet Dream Sleeper (Remix)'.
