= Clairvoyant (EP) =

EP by Jenn Grant
- Released: May 9, 2014 (Europe)
- Genre: pop
- Label: Outside Music
- Producer: Daniel Ledwell

Jenn Grant chronology
The Beautiful Wild (2012)	Clairvoyant (2014)	Compostela (2014)

Clairvoyant is an EP by the Canadian singer-songwriter Jenn Grant, released in May 2014 for European release on Outside Music. The EP preceded by a few months her fifth full studio album, Compostela. It features collaborations with Buck 65 and others. Her Buck 65 collaboration "Spades" and the Stewart Legere collaboration "No One's Gonna Love You (Quite Like I Do)", (also on Compostela) appear alongside four other tunes on this EP.

== Track listing ==
1. Epic Sweep (AquaAlta) 03:56
2. Spades (Feat: Buck 65) 03:50
3. I've Got Your Fire (2014 version) 04:30
4. Lover Lover Lover 03:57
5. Norwegian Jewel (AquaAlta) 02:47
6. No One's Gonna Love You (Quite Like I Do) 03:54
