= Rachel Davis =

Rachel Davis may refer to:

- Rachel Cory Hutchins, née Davis, a character from the soap opera Another World
- Rachel Davis (musician), fiddler from Cape Breton Island, Nova Scotia
