= We Are an Empire, My Dear =

Studio album by In-Flight Safety
- Released: 2009
- Recorded: Fox River, Nova Scotia, Halifax, Toronto
- Genre: Indie rock
- Label: Night Danger Records
- Producer: Laurence Currie and In-Flight Safety

In-Flight Safety chronology
The Coast Is Clear (2006)	We Are an Empire, My Dear (2009)

We Are an Empire, My Dear is the second album by Canadian band In-Flight Safety, released in 2009 on Night Danger Records. The album was produced by Laurence Currie and In-flight Safety. It was recorded primarily at Fox River School House No. 9, in Fox River, Nova Scotia, with additional recording in Halifax and Toronto, Ontario.

== Critical reception ==
Reviews have been mixed, with critics noting a similarity to the style of the band Coldplay.

== Track listing ==
All songs were written by In-Flight Safety; lyrics were written by John Mullane.

1. "I Could Love You More"
2. "Big White Elephant"
3. "Model Homes"
4. "Crash/Land"
5. "Torches"
6. "Actors"
7. "Amy Racina"
8. "Cloudhead"
9. "Paperthin II"
10. "Paperthin"
11. "The Warning"
12. "Fill Our Wounds"

== Personnel ==
- In-Flight Safety:
  - Brad Goodsell
  - Daniel Ledwell
  - Glen Nicholson
  - John Mullane
- Guest musicians:
  - Kinley Dowling – viola and violin on tracks 1, 3, 10, 11 and 12
  - Scott Remila – vocals on tracks 1, 3, 4, 5, 6, 7, 8 and 10
  - The Duffus Street Choir (Lia Rinaldo, Crad Price, Matt Charlton, Tara Thorne, Jenn Grant, Aaron Collier, Chris Pennell, Andrew Stretch, Craig Buckley, Ryan Turner, Jenna Higgins) – vocals on tracks 3 and 10
