= Boy Golden (musician) =

Canadian singer-songwriter

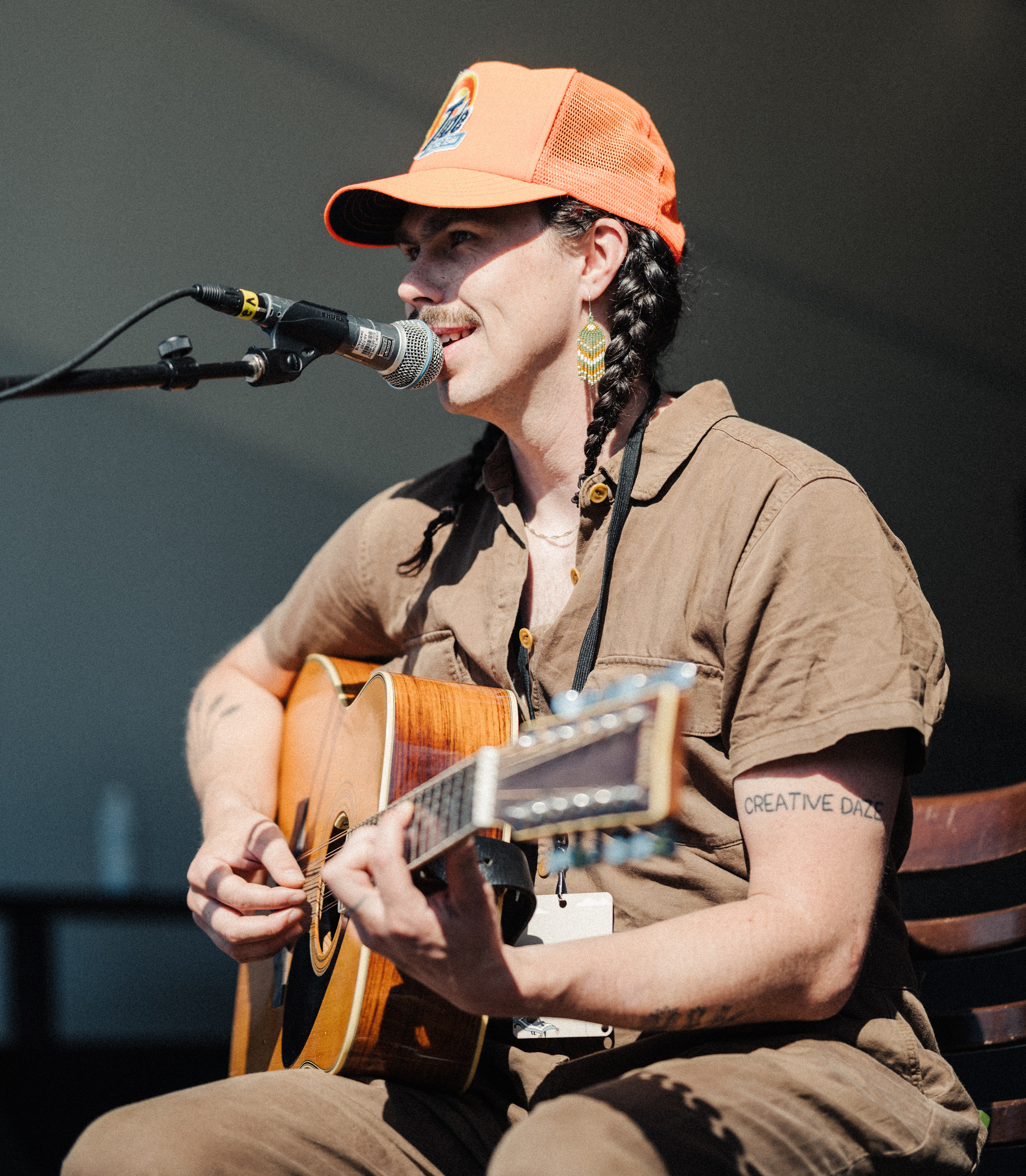
- Boy Golden in 2024

Background information
- Born: Liam Duncan Brandon, Manitoba
- Genres: Folk; alternative country; Americana; roots rock; alternative rock
- Instruments: Guitar
- Years active: 2021–present

Boy Golden is the stage name of Liam Duncan, a Canadian alternative country singer-songwriter based in Winnipeg, Manitoba.

== Background ==
Born and raised in Brandon, he moved to Winnipeg to pursue his musical career, initially as a member of the indie rock band The Middle Coast. Following that band's breakup he released the solo album If I Don't Feel Better under his own name in 2019, but after feeling drained and exhausted by the process of creating and touring behind an album with heavy emotional themes, he began creating the Boy Golden persona to present a more easygoing and positive-minded brand of music.

== Career ==
Church of Better Daze, his debut album as Boy Golden, was released in 2021. He followed up with the six-song EP For Jimmy in 2023, supporting the release with his first full headlining tour of North America.

The album For Eden followed in 2024, and was again supported by a North American tour.

He has also appeared as a guest musician on recordings by The Bros. Landreth and Jacob Brodovsky, and produced the debut album of singer-songwriter CJ Wiley.

His latest album, Best of Our Possible Lives, was released in February 2026. "Suffer", the album's lead single, reached #1 on the Billboard Canada Modern Rock Airplay chart in December 2025.

== Awards ==
He was a Canadian Folk Music Award nominee for Contemporary Singer of the Year at the 18th Canadian Folk Music Awards in 2023 for Church of Better Daze, and Contemporary Album of the Year at the 20th Canadian Folk Music Awards in 2025 for For Jimmy.

For Eden received a Juno Award nomination for Contemporary Roots Album of the Year at the Juno Awards of 2025. At the 20th Canadian Folk Music Awards, he won the award for Contemporary Album of the Year for For Jimmy.

Best of Our Possible Lives was longlisted for the 2026 Polaris Music Prize.

== Discography ==
- If I Don't Feel Better - 2019, as Liam Duncan
- Church of Better Daze - 2021
- For Jimmy - 2023
- For Eden - 2024
- Best of Our Possible Lives - 2026

Singles

Title	Year	Peak chart positions		Album
Title	Year	CAN Modern Rock	US AAA	Album
"Cowboy Dreams" (feat. Cat Clyde)	2025	30	39	Best of Our Possible Lives
"Suffer"	2025	1	—	Best of Our Possible Lives
"Pity"	2026	40	—	Best of Our Possible Lives (Deluxe)
