= In-Flight Safety =

Canadian indie rock band

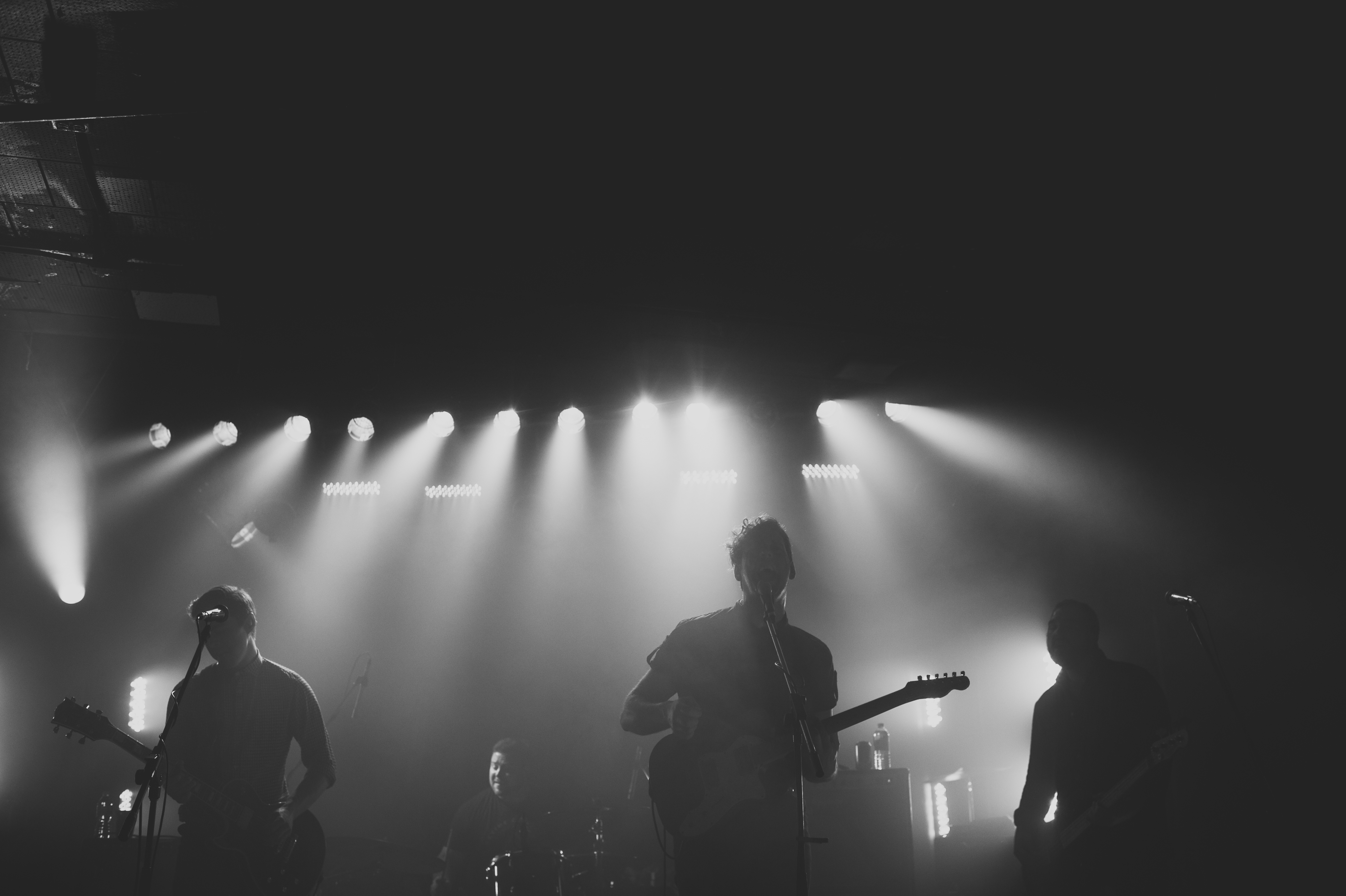
- In-Flight Safety performing at The Marquee Club in Halifax (2014)

Background information
- Origin: Sackville, New Brunswick, Canada
- Genres: Indie rock
- Years active: 2003–present
- Labels: Dead Daisy; Night Danger (Canada); Conehead (UK); Waggle-Daggle (Germany); Ooh La La (USA)
- Members: John Mullane; Glen Nicholson
- Past members: Brad Goodsell; Daniel Ledwell; Jon Sheen
- Website: inflightsafety.ca

In-Flight Safety is a Canadian indie rock band formed in 2003. In-Flight Safety was nominated for a 2007 Juno Award for Video of the Year for "Coast Is Clear". They are currently based in Halifax, Nova Scotia. The group consists of vocalist and guitarist John Mullane, drummer Glen Nicholson and is rounded out by friends who appear in the live show. In-Flight Safety released their second full-length album We Are an Empire, My Dear 27 January 2009 in Canada on their own label Night Danger. The band released their third full-length album, Conversationalist (mixed by Gus Van Go) on 9 September 2014.

== History ==
The group met while undergrad students at Mount Allison University, in Sackville. At university the members of In-Flight Safety studied non-musical subjects: Daniel Ledwell was enrolled in fine arts, Brad Goodsell majored in geography, Mullane pursued a computer science degree and Nicholson studied art history and classics. Inspired by a short email from David Bowie praising their basement-recorded Vacation Land EP (sent to the band via Emm Gryner) the members began dedicating the majority of their time to music.

The band self-released its debut EP, Vacation Land, in 2004. The EP was distributed by Universal Music Canada. They subsequently signed to Emm Gryner's Dead Daisy Records, and released their full-length debut album, The Coast Is Clear, in early 2006. The Coast Is Clear was produced by Warne Livesey. The band is in rotation on CBC Radio and has garnered airplay on Halifax rock station Q104.

The band toured across Canada in the spring of 2006 to support both recordings. In-Flight Safety completed a tour of the United Kingdom and Ireland in the fall of the same year. They completed a Canadian tour with fellow rock band Raising the Fawn from 25 October 2006 to 25 November 2006. It was their second tour across Canada with Raising the Fawn. Following the Raising the Fawn tour, the band linked up with Young Galaxy for a west coast tour in 2007.

Dell Computers used In-Flight Safety's "Surround" as the score for their North American ad campaign in 2006. The award-winning video for "Coast Is Clear" was released in 2006 and received regular play on MuchMusic and MuchMoreMusic in Canada. It was directed by Drew Lightfoot and filmed on the south shore of Nova Scotia.

Their second album, We Are an Empire, My Dear, was released in 2009. After the release of We Are an Empire, My Dear the band completed two more national tours, one in the fall of 2009 with Library Voices and one in March 2010 with Said the Whale and Yukon Blonde. We Are an Empire, My Dear was released in UK and Germany in 2011. The band toured Europe in support of the album in March, April and May 2011. In September 2011, BBC Radio 1 presenter Zane Lowe chose "Paperthin" as the next hype track.

== Other activities ==
Guitarist and singer John Mullane also does composition for film and television. In 2011, he scored feature film Charlie Zone, "a portrayal of the dark side of Halifax—the drug dens, the violence", starring Amanda Crew. Mullane made a cameo appearance on the Syfy series Haven in which he played a lounge singer in the season 3 episode "Sarah". He also performed the vocals for the rendition of Fats Domino's "Ain't That a Shame" used in that episode. Drummer Glen Nicholson studied architecture at Dalhousie University in Halifax.

== Soundtrack appearances ==
- The song "Fill Our Wounds" was featured in The Listener.
- Their songs "Big White Elephant" and "Model Homes" were featured in the American adaption of The Office in the episode Pool Party. Also, "Model Homes" is featured on other TV shows, like Chuck, Degrassi: The Next Generation and Rookie Blue.
- "Surround" was featured in the film WarGames: The Dead Code.
- "Destroy" appeared in the season 5 premiere of The Vampire Diaries. A music video for the song was filmed a year later where they are shown performing on the set that was used in the TV show Haven.
- "Blue Flares" also appeared on Haven twice including the final episode.

== Awards and nominations ==
In-Flight Safety won three awards at the 2007 East Coast Music Awards:

- Rising Star Recording of the Year (The Coast Is Clear)
- Alternative Recording of the Year (The Coast Is Clear)
- Group Recording of the Year (The Coast Is Clear)

Nominated for Video of the Year at the 2007 Juno Awards for "Coast Is Clear".

Nominated for two Much Music Video Awards (MMVA) in 2007 for Indie Video of The Year and Best Post Production for "Coast Is Clear".

In-Flight Safety won two awards at the 2010 East Coast Music Awards:

- Alternative Recording of the Year (We Are An Empire, My Dear)
- Group Recording of the Year (We Are An Empire, My Dear)

The group picked up Album of the Year (Conversationalist) at the East Coast Music Award in 2015.

== Band members ==
- Glen Nicholson – drums (2002–present)
- John Mullane – guitar, vocals (2002–present)

=== Former members ===
- Brad Goodsell – bass guitar (2002–2012)
- Jon Sheen – keyboards (2002–2004)
- Daniel Ledwell – keyboards, backing vocals, guitar (2004–2012)

== Discography ==
=== EPs ===
- 2004: Vacation Land
- 2016: Stockholm

=== Albums ===
- 2006: The Coast Is Clear
- 2009: We Are an Empire, My Dear
- 2014: Conversationalist

=== Compilations ===
- 2006: Our Power "The Heart Strings"

== See also ==
- Canadian rock
- List of Canadian musicians
- List of bands from Canada
- Category:Canadian musical groups
