= The Coast Is Clear (In-Flight Safety album) =

Studio album by In-Flight Safety
- Released: January 24, 2006
- Recorded: Vancouver, British Columbia, Canada; Halifax, Nova Scotia, Canada
- Genre: Indie rock
- Length: 45:12
- Label: Dead Daisy
- Producer: In-Flight Safety

In-Flight Safety chronology
Vacation Land (2004)	The Coast Is Clear (2006)	We Are an Empire, My Dear (2009)

The Coast Is Clear is the debut album by Canadian indie rock band In-Flight Safety, released on January 24, 2006, on Dead Daisy Records and distributed by Outside Music. The album was recognized by the music industry, with the group winning three awards at the 2006 Nova Scotia Music Awards, including Album of the Year. In 2007, they won three East Coast Music Awards, including Group Recording of the Year for this album. The music video for "Coast Is Clear" was nominated for Video of the Year at the 2007 Juno Awards. Lead vocalist and guitarist John Mullane wrote the lyrics for each song.

== Recording ==
Recorded at a number of studios in Vancouver and Halifax, the album was self-produced by the band. Drums on tracks 1, 2, 7, 9, and 10 were recorded by Laurence Currie at Sonic Temple Studio, Halifax, Nova Scotia, Canada. The assistant engineer was Darren van Niekerk. Bass was recorded by Currie at Idea of East, Halifax, Nova Scotia, Canada with Craig Sperry as assistant engineer. Technical support was provided by Michael Ryan.

Pre-production for the remainder of the album was done by Wayne Livesey at The Rockspace, former home to Little Mountain Sound Studios, Vancouver, British Columbia, Canada. Drums and bass were recorded by Livesey at Mushroom Studios, Vancouver, British Columbia, Canada. Additional recording (also by Livesey) was done at The Shed, Vancouver, British Columbia, Canada. The second engineer was Joel Livesey.

== Packaging ==
Album design was done by In-Flight Safety. The painting of the girl (on the reverse side) is by Andrzej Michael Karwacki. Karen Baer provided the band photo on the inside sleeve.

== Track listing ==
All lyrics by John Mullane. Music written by In-Flight Safety except as noted.

1. "Coast Is Clear"
2. "Time & Place"
3. "Surround" (In-Flight Safety, Jon Sheen)
4. "A Lot to Learn" (In-Flight Safety, Sheen)
5. "Letting Go"
6. "Turn Me Around"
7. "Fear"
8. "The World Won't"
9. "Silent Treatment"
10. "Lost (The March Song)"

== Personnel ==
- In-Flight Safety:
  - Brad Goodsell – bass, gang vocals
  - Daniel Ledwell – piano, organ, Mellotron, glockenspiel, backing vocals
  - John Mullane – vocals, guitars, glockenspiel
  - Glen Nicholson – drums, gang vocals
- Guest musicians:
  - Jon Sheen – Rhodes, mellotron
  - Jill Barber – additional vocals
  - Rose Cousins – additional vocals
  - Jenn Grant – additional vocals
- Production:
  - Joa Carvalho - mastering
  - John Mullane, In-Flight Safety - Mixing
  - Daniel Ledwell, John Mullane - overdub recording at Northern Electron Studios, Halifax, Nova Scotia, Canada
  - Karen Baer - band photo inside sleeve
