= Compostela (album) =

Studio album by Jenn Grant
- Released: October 21, 2014
- Genre: pop
- Label: Outside Music
- Producer: Daniel Ledwell

Jenn Grant chronology
Clairvoyant (2014)	Compostela (2014)

Compostela is the fifth full-length studio album by the Canadian singer-songwriter Jenn Grant, released October 21, 2014, on Outside Music.

The album features collaborations with Buck 65, Sarah Harmer, Ron Sexsmith, Rose Cousins, Don Kerr, Doug Paisley, Kim Harris, Stewart Legere, Justin Rutledge and Rachel Sermanni. Two tracks, the Buck 65 collaboration "Spades" and the Stewart Legere collaboration "No One's Gonna Love You (Quite Like I Do)", appeared alongside four non-album tracks on her EP Clairvoyant, released earlier in 2014.

The album was a shortlisted Juno Award nominee for Adult Alternative Album of the Year at the Juno Awards of 2015.

== Track listing ==
1. "Bombshell"
2. "Trailer Park"
3. "Spades"
4. "Stranger in the Night"
5. "Bring Me a Rose"
6. "Barcelona"
7. "No One's Gonna Love You (Quite Like I Do)"
8. "Canadian Maple Grove"
9. "Wild Animal"
10. "Spanish Moon"
11. "American Man"
12. "Hummingbird"
13. "Mauve"
