= Jake Vaadeland =

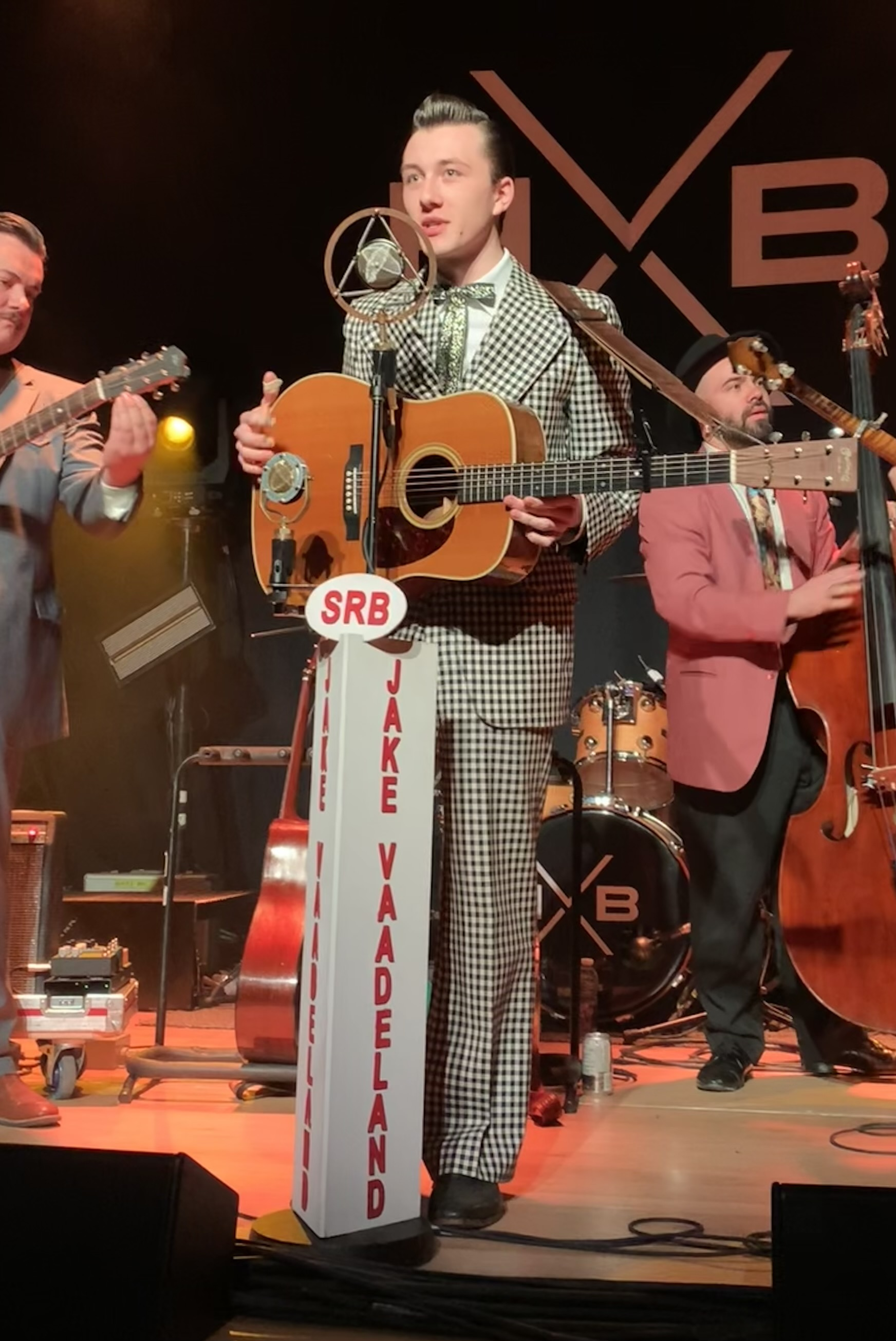
- Vaadeland and the Sturgeon River Boys performing in Toronto, Ontario, at the TD Music Hall in November 2023

Background information
- Born: 2003 or 2004 (age 21–22)
- Origin: Cut Knife, Saskatchewan, Canada
- Genres: Country; bluegrass; folk; traditional country
- Occupation(s): Singer, songwriter
- Instrument(s): Guitar, vocals
- Years active: 2021-present
- Labels: Jayward Artist Group
- Website: Official website

Jake Vaadeland is a Canadian country and bluegrass singer-songwriter from Cut Knife, Saskatchewan, who won the Juno Award for Traditional Roots Album of the Year at the Juno Awards of 2025 for his album Retro Man ... More and More. Vaadeland performs with his supporting band the Sturgeon River Boys.

Vaadeland released two EPs independently in 2021. In 2022, he released his debut album Everybody But Me. In the fall of 2023, Vaadeland and the Sturgeon River Boys supported the Hunter Brothers as opening acts on their "Burnin' Down the Bar Tour" across Canada. In 2024, Vaadeland signed a publishing deal with Arts & Crafts Productions and a distribution deal with the Jayward Artist Group. That year, he released Retro Man...More and More, an expansion of his 2021 debut EP.

On April 25, 2025, Vaadeland released his third album One More Dollar to Go. It won Alternative Country Album of the Year at the 2025 Canadian Country Music Association Awards. He was a finalist in the 2025 SiriusXM Top of the Country competition for emerging Canadian country musicians.

== Discography ==
=== Albums ===
Title	Details
Everybody But Me	Release date: September 8, 2022; Label: Independent; Format: CD, digital download, streaming
Retro Man...More and More	Release date: April 26, 2024; Label: Independent; Format: CD, vinyl, digital download, streaming
One More Dollar to Go	Release date: April 25, 2025; Label: Independent; Format: CD, vinyl, digital download, streaming

=== Extended plays ===
Title	Details
Retro Man	Release date: August 1, 2021; Label: Independent; Format: Digital download, streaming
No More Pain in My Heart	Release date: November 13, 2021; Label: Independent; Format: Digital download, streaming

=== Singles ===
Year	Single	Album
2024	"Until the Day I See You Dear"	Retro Man...More and More
