= Colleen Peterson Songwriting Award =

Canadian music award

The Colleen Peterson Songwriting Award is an annual Canadian award, presented to the year's best song by an emerging singer-songwriter from Ontario in the genres of roots, traditional, folk and country music. The award, created in memory of Canadian country singer Colleen Peterson, is sponsored by the Ontario Arts Council and the Ontario Council of Folk Festivals (OCFF), and is presented to a songwriter selected from 15 nominations put forward by the OCFF's Songs from the Heart songwriting competition, excluding overall winners of the Galaxie Rising Stars Awards. The award was initially funded in part by royalties from the sale of Postcards from California, a posthumous album collecting some of Peterson's unreleased demo recordings.

The award was presented for the first time in 2003.

== Winners ==
- 2003 – Evalyn Parry, "The Stone and the Bumblebee"
- 2004 – David Gillis, "A Mouse's Crumb"
- 2005 – Lori Cullen and Brian MacMillan, "Away So Long"
- 2006 – Andy Sheppard, "Until Next Time"
- 2007 – Brooke Miller, "Two Soldiers"
- 2008 – Chris MacLean, "Feet Be Still"
- 2009 – Kyrie Kristmanson, "Song X"
- 2010 – Lynne Hanson, "Rest of My Days"
- 2011 – Alise Marlane, "L'aurore boréale"
- 2012 – Ariana Gillis, "Dream Street"
- 2013 – Leila Goldberger, "Sisters"
- 2014 – Ken Yates, "The One That Got Away"
- 2015 – Graydon James, "Couldn't Be Any Worse"
- 2016 – Abigail Lapell, "Jordan"
- 2017 – Noosa Al-Sarraj, "Pincushion Soldier"
- 2018 – Lora Bidner, "3,000 Volts"
- 2019 - Suzanne Jarvie, "All in Place"
- 2020 - Danielle Knibbe, "Footnote"
- 2021 - Julie Title, "Ghost"
- 2022 - Camie, "Winter"
- 2023 - Just Prince, "Kamli"
- 2024 - Leah Holtom, "Face of the Day"

Ariana Gillis, the winner of the award in 2012, is the daughter of 2004 winner David Gillis.
