= Juno Award for Traditional Roots Album of the Year =

Canadian music award

The Juno Award for Traditional Roots Album of the Year is presented annually at Canada's Juno Awards to honour the best album of the year in the traditional roots genre. Prior to 2016, awards for this genre were awarded in two categories: Roots & Traditional - Solo and Roots & Traditional - Group. The awards categories were modified, to Traditional Roots and Contemporary Roots, beginning with the 2016 ceremony to "ensure two genres of music are not competing against each other in the same category".

== Winners and nominees ==
Year	Winner(s)	Album	Nominees	Ref.
2016	Pharis and Jason Romero	A Wanderer I'll Stay	J. P. Cormier, The Chance; Jayme Stone, Jayme Stone's Lomax Project; Old Man Luedecke, Domestic Eccentric; The Wainwright Sisters, Songs in the Dark	
2017	The East Pointers	Secret Victory	Maria Dunn, Gathering; The High Bar Gang, Someday the Heart Will Trouble the Mind; Ten Strings and a Goat Skin, Auprès du poêle; Jenny Whiteley, The Original Jenny Whiteley	
2018	The Dead South	Illusion & Doubt	Cassie and Maggie, The Willow Collection; Còig, Rove; Jayme Stone, Jayme Stone's Folklife; The East Pointers, What We Leave Behind	
2019	Pharis and Jason Romero	Sweet Old Religion	David Francey, The Broken Heart of Everything; The Slocan Ramblers, Queen City Jubilee; Vishtèn, Horizons; The Wailin' Jennys, Fifteen	
2020	The Dead South	Sugar & Joy	Natalie MacMaster, Sketches; Miranda Mulholland, By Appointment or Chance; The Small Glories, Assiniboine and the Red; April Verch, Once a Day	
2021	Pharis and Jason Romero	Bet on Love	Beòlach, All Hands; Le Diable à Cinq, Debout!; Nick Hornbuckle, 13 or So; Rum Ragged, The Thing About Fish	
2022	Maria Dunn	Joyful Banner Blazing	Alan Doyle, Back to the Harbour; The Fugitives, Trench Songs; Over the Moon, Chinook Waltz; John Reischman, New Time & Old Acoustic	
2023	Pharis and Jason Romero	Tell 'em You were Gold	Allison de Groot and Tatiana Hargreaves, Hurricane Clarice; Mama's Broke, Narrow Line; The McDades, The Empress; Le Vent du Nord, 20 printemps	
2024	David Francey	The Breath Between	Jackson Hollow, Roses; James Keelaghan, Second Hand; Benjamin Dakota Rogers, Paint Horse; Morgan Toney, Resilience	
2025	Jake Vaadeland	Retro Man ... More and More	La Bottine Souriante, Domino!; Inn Echo, Hemispheres; Loreena McKennitt, The Road Back Home (Live); Sylvia Tyson, At the End of the Day	
2026	Morgan Toney	Heal the Divide	Aerialists, I Lost My Heart on Friday; Cassie and Maggie, Gold and Coal; Heather MacIsaac, The Moon's Daughter; The Southern Residents, Folk Signals	
