= Danny Michel =

Canadian songwriter and producer (born 1970)

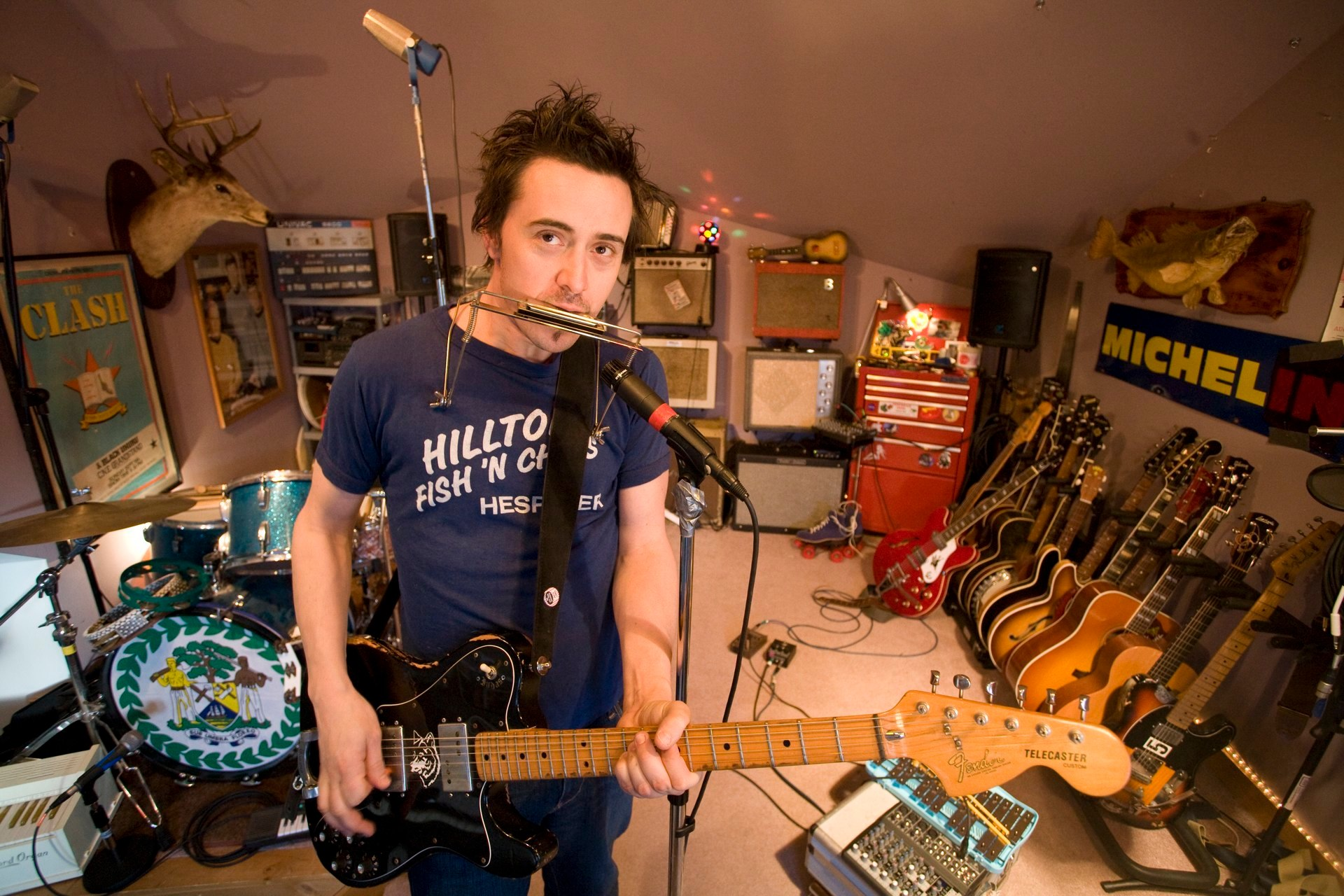
- Michel in his studio in 2011

Background information
- Born: January 31, 1970 (age 56); Kitchener-Waterloo, Ontario, Canada
- Occupations: Musician, songwriter, producer
- Instruments: Guitar, drums, bass, keys
- Labels: TimeBomb Recordings US/MapleMusic Recordings/Universal Music Canada, Six Shooter, Cumbancha, Stonetree Records BZ
- Website: www.dannymichel.com

Danny Michel (born January 31, 1970) is a Canadian songwriter and producer.

== Highlights ==
In 2003, Michel was nominated "New Artist of the Year" by the Canadian Juno Awards. Between 2006 and 2015, he performed over 75 times as the musical guest on Stuart McLean's The Vinyl Cafe. In 2008, Feather, Fur & Fin landed on the "Playlist for the Planet" released by the David Suzuki Foundation. Michel performed on Suzuki's Blue Dot Tour as well as his 75th birthday party in 2011. In 2019, Michel performed for Dr. Jane Goodall at her 85th birthday party in Toronto. In 2022, his single “Don’t Be So Hard on Yourself” was CBC's TOP 20 #1 voted song of the year.

== Belize & The Garifuna Collective ==
In 2011, Michel relocated to Belize to record with The Garifuna Collective, an Afro-Amerindian cultural group, on the album Black Birds Are Dancing Over Me. The album landed a Juno Award nomination in the world music category and a sold-out summer tour of North America with The Garifuna Collective as his band. In June 2013, the album was long-listed for the 2013 Polaris Music Prize. It was released in Canada on Six Shooter Records and worldwide on Cumbancha Records.

== The Ocean Academy School Fund ==
While in Belize, Michel created the Danny Michel Ocean Academy Fund, helping raise scholarships for the Caye Caulker Community School, a small non-profit community high school. The fund has raised over $125,000.00 USD.

== The Arctic / Khlebnikov Project ==
In 2017 Michel released Khlebnikov, a classical-based album written and recorded with film composer & childhood friend Robert Carli aboard the Russian ice-breaker Kapitan Khlebnikov, during an 18-day Arctic expedition through the Northwest Passage with Canadian astronaut Chris Hadfield and a collection of artists from around the world. He won two Canadian Folk Music Awards for Khlebnikov at the 13th Canadian Folk Music Awards, for Producer of the Year (with Carli) and the Pushing the Boundaries award.

== Dan's Space Van ==
Dan’s Space Van is a mobile web series created and hosted by Michel. The show takes place in an original customized 1978 GMC Vandura (airbrushed in 1980 in a Star Trek theme). The show features musical guests who perform in the van. Past guests include Apple co-founder Steve Wozniak, astronaut Chris Hadfield, Sarah Harmer, Alan Doyle, Blue Rodeo, Barenaked Ladies, 54-40, Fred Penner, The Milk Carton Kids, Bahamas, Joel Plaskett, Hawksley Workman, Steve Poltz, Kevin Breit, Irish Mythen, Alysha Brilla, Del Barber, Leeroy Stagger, Emm Gryner, Lindy Vopnfjord, Matt Mays, Dustin Bentall, Kendel Carson, Shane Koyczan, Barney Bentall, Mark Lalama, and Rose Cousins.

== Awards ==
- 1996 won - Kitchener Waterloo Arts Awards
- 2003 nominated - "New Artist of the Year" - the Juno Awards
- 2007 nominated - "Music DVD of The Year" - the Juno Awards
- 2013 nominated - "World Music Album Of The Year" - the Juno Awards
- 2013 nominated - Polaris Music Prize
- 2017 won - "Producer of the Year" - Canadian Folk Music Awards
- 2017 won - Oliver Schroer "Pushing the Boundaries" Award - Canadian Folk Music Awards

== Discography ==
Official albums

- 1999 Fibsville - independent
- 2001 In the Belly of a Whale - independent
- 2003 Tales from the Invisible Man - Maple Music/Universal
- 2004 Loving the Alien, The Songs Of David Bowie - Maple Music/Universal
- 2006 Valhalla - Maple Music/Universal
- 2008 Feather, Fur & Fin - independent
- 2010 Sunset Sea - independent
- 2010 Live in Winnipeg- independent
- 2012 Black Birds Are Dancing Over Me - Six Shooter Records/Stone Tree Records
- 2016 Matadora - Six Shooter Records
- 2017 Khlebnikov - independent
- 2018 White & Gold - independent
- 2023 Ghost Town - independent
