= Juurini =

Juurini is the traditional Inuit language name of Joey Partridge, a Canadian folk singer-songwriter from Kuujjuaq, Quebec. He is most noted for his 2023 album Aqqutinni, for which he received a Félix Award nomination for Indigenous Language Album of the Year at the 46th Félix Awards in 2024, and a Canadian Folk Music Award nomination for Contemporary Album of the Year at the 20th Canadian Folk Music Awards in 2025.

He debuted in 2020 with the EP Saimanrimut.
