= Patrick Ledwell =

Canadian stand-up comedian

Patrick Ledwell is a Canadian stand-up comedian, best known as a frequent guest on the CBC Radio comedy series The Debaters. The son of poet and university professor Frank Ledwell and the brother of musician and artist Daniel Ledwell, he is from Charlottetown, Prince Edward Island.

In 2012, Ledwell published the humour book I Am an Islander, which was illustrated by Daniel. Some copies of the book were sold with a bonus DVD of Think Like a Fish, an animated film on which Patrick and Daniel also collaborated. In 2016, he published the sequel book An Islander Strikes Back.

In 2017, he played John A. Macdonald in Jonathan Torrens's Canada Day comedy special Your Special Canada. Ledwell also regularly performs with musician Mark Haines as part of the Island Summer Review, a music and storytelling show.

In 2020, during the COVID-19 pandemic in Canada, he was one of the guest readers in The East Pointers' livestreamed "#Annedemic" readings of Anne of Green Gables.
