= Cassie and Maggie =

Canadian folk music duo

Cassie and Maggie MacDonald are a sibling folk music duo from Nova Scotia. They are most noted for their 2016 album The Willow Collection, for which they won the Canadian Folk Music Award for Best Traditional Album at the 13th Canadian Folk Music Awards in 2017, and were Juno Award nominees for Traditional Roots Album of the Year at the Juno Awards of 2018.

Maggie sings lead vocals and plays piano and guitar, while Cassie sings harmony vocals and plays fiddle, and both sisters step dance.

== Discography ==
- Fresh Heirs (2011)
- Sterling Road (2014)
- The Willow Collection (2016)
- A Very Very Cassie and Maggie Christmas (2022)
- Gold and Coal (2025)
