= Ken Yates =

Canadian folk singer-songwriter

- Born: London, Ontario, Canada
- Occupations: Musician, songwriter
- Instruments: Vocalist, guitarist

Ken Yates is a Canadian folk singer-songwriter, who won the Canadian Folk Music Awards for English Songwriter of the Year and New/Emerging Artist of the Year at the 13th Canadian Folk Music Awards in 2017.

Originally from London, Ontario, Yates studied at the Berklee College of Music. He released The Backseat EP in 2011, and followed up with his full-length debut twenty-three in 2013. He won the Colleen Peterson Songwriting Award in 2014 for his song "The One That Got Away".

His second album, Huntsville, was released in 2016 and was produced by Jim Bryson.

Yates released the singles, "Two Wrongs", "Quiet Talkers", and "When We Came Home", in advance of his full-length album, Quiet Talkers, released in 2020. He released Cerulean, on June 3, 2022.

He released his latest album, Total Cinema, on June 6, 2025.

== Discography ==
- Twenty-Three (2013, Mishara Music)
- Huntsville (2016, Self-Released)
- Quiet Talkers (2020, Self-Released)
- Cerulean (2022, Self-Released)
- Total Cinema (2025, Tone Tree Music)
