= Rachel Davis (musician) =

Canadian musician

- Origin: Baddeck, Nova Scotia, Canada
- Genres: Celtic, folk
- Occupation: Musician
- Instrument: Fiddle
- Website: rachel-davis.ca

Rachel Davis is a Canadian fiddler from Baddeck on Cape Breton Island, Nova Scotia, Canada.

== Career ==
Davis has performed with musicians such as The Cottars, Buddy MacDonald, Carmel Mikol and Donnie Campbell. She has been showcased at the East Coast Music Awards and performs regularly at the Celtic Colours Festival. Davis has toured throughout Canada, the United States, Scotland, and Australia. Her eponymous debut CD was released in 2009, at the Celtic Colours Festival. Davis is one of the members of the Celtic Music Group Còig.

== Awards ==
- 2020 Canadian Folk Music Awards, Traditional Singer of the Year
- 2010 Nominated for Canadian Folk Music Awards, Young Performer of the Year
- 2009 Frank “Big Sampy” Sampson Award, sponsored by the Celtic Colours Festival Volunteer Drive'er Association, and Lakewind Sound Studios
- 2007 Tic Butler Memorial Award
