= Mélisande (électrotrad) =

Canadian folk music group

Mélisande [électrotrad] is a Canadian folk music group, who perform a contemporary spin on traditional Québécois folk music. The group's core members are Alexandre "Moulin" de Grosbois-Garand and Mélisande Gélinas-Fauteux, a married couple from Beloeil, Quebec, who perform with a rotating collective of supporting musicians and dancers.

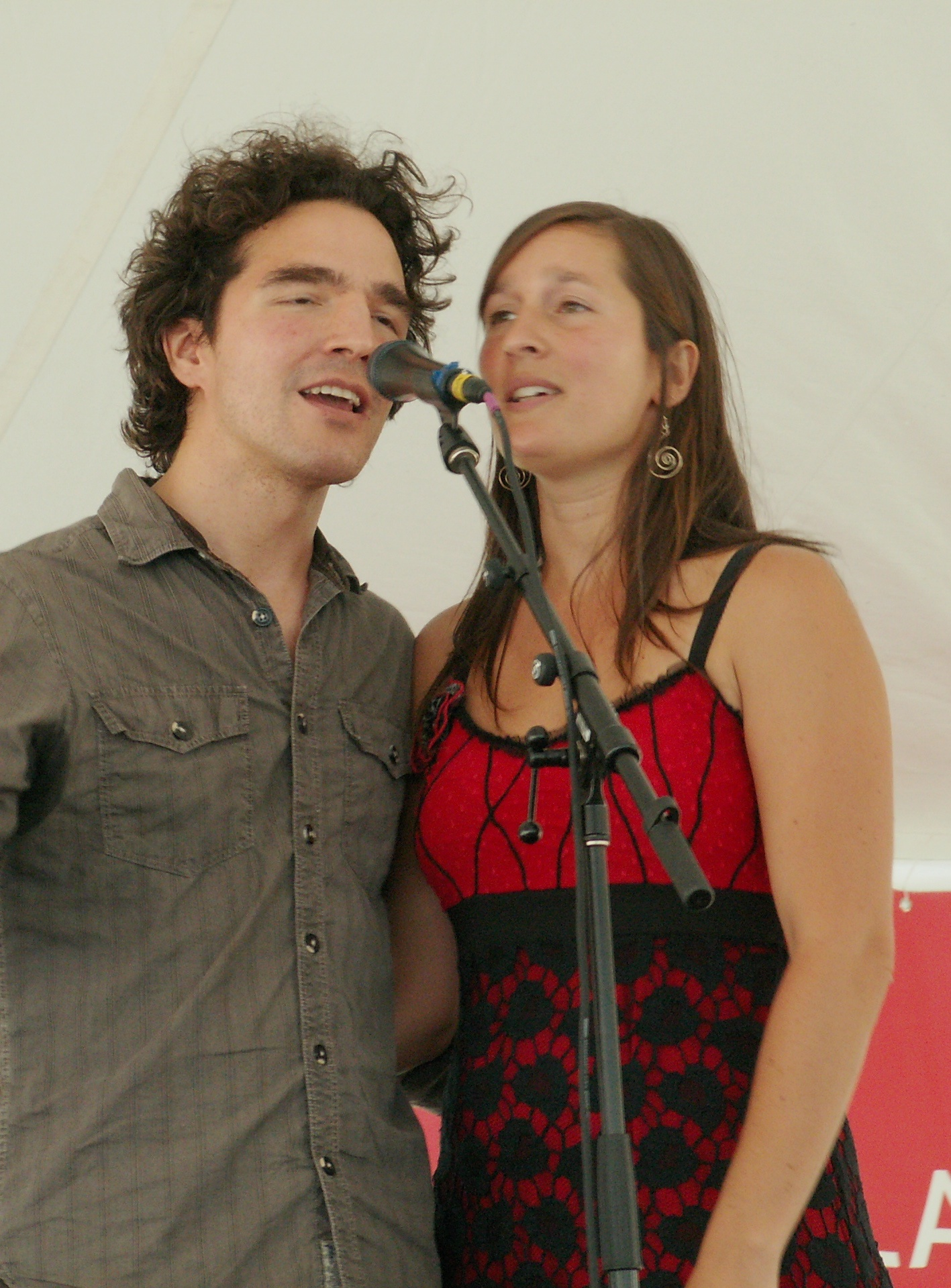
Singing as part of Genticorum

== History ==
Mélisande Gélinas-Fauteux and Alexandre de Grosbois-Garand began playing together in 2007, performing Mélisande's original songs. The two married in 2012 and started working together on mixing traditional songs with electro-pop music. Mélisande's background as pop-rock singer combined with Moulin's experience has a multi-instrumentalist with Genticorum and other traditional band gave an interesting result.

The band released its first electrotrad album Les métamorphoses in 2014 on La Prûche Libre, for which Mélisande won the Canadian Folk Music Award for Traditional Singer of the Year at the 10th Canadian Folk Music Awards. Other players on the album were Robin Boulianne and Mark Busic (producer of the album).

Their second album, Les millésimes, was released in 2017 on Borealis Records, garnering the band two more Canadian Folk Music Award nominations, for Traditional Singer of the Year and Pushing the Boundaries, at the 13th Canadian Folk Music Awards.

== Discography ==
- Les métamorphoses (2014)
- Les millésimes (2017)
- Les Myriades (2019)
