= The Dead South =

Canadian folk-bluegrass musical ensemble

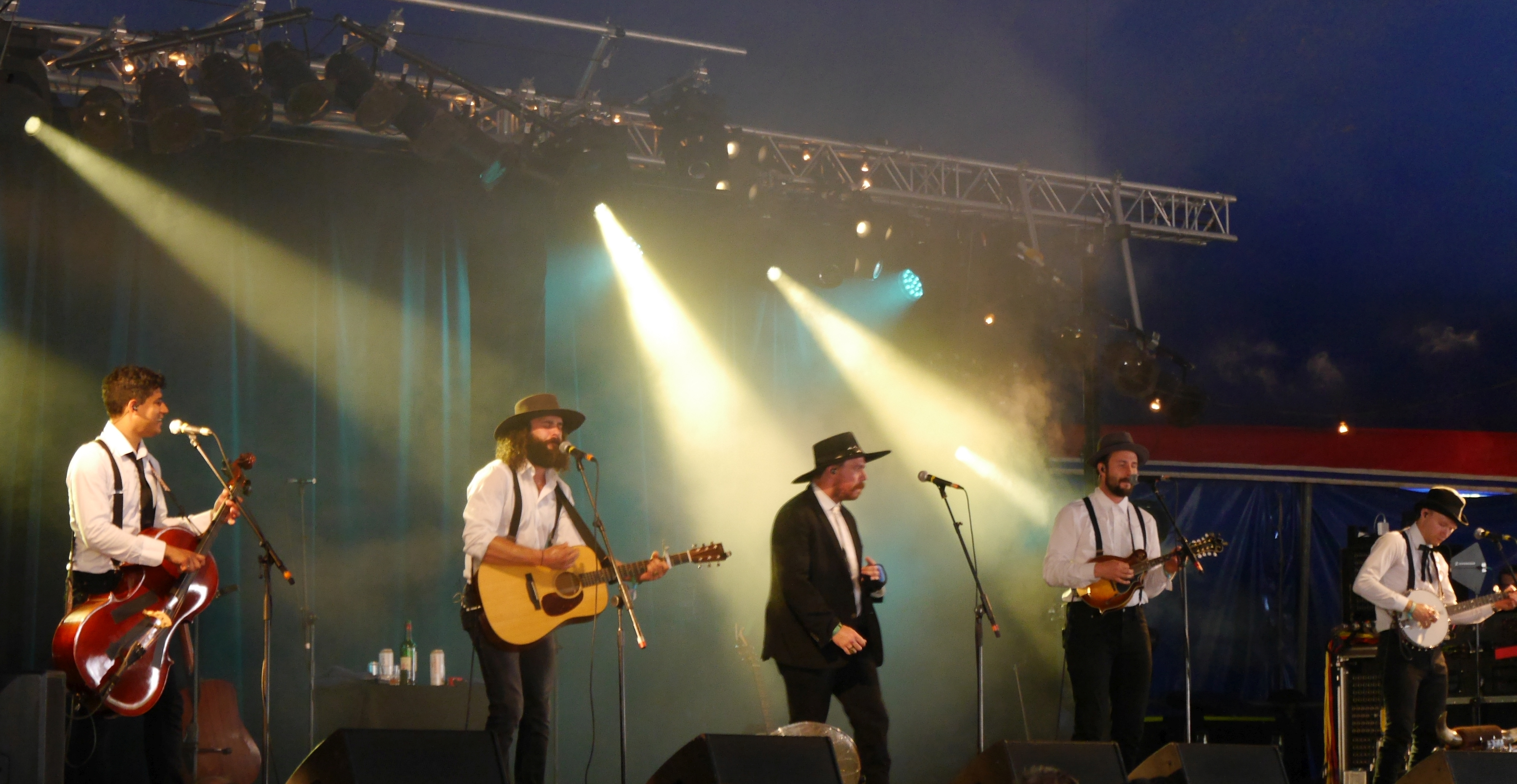
- The Dead South, Glastonbury Festival, 2019

Background information
- Origin: Regina, Saskatchewan, Canada
- Genres: Folk; bluegrass; rock
- Years active: 2012–present
- Labels: Six Shooter; Devil Duck Records; Curve Music
- Members: Nathaniel Hilts; Scott Pringle; Colton "Crawdaddy" Crawford; Danny Kenyon
- Past members: Eliza Mary Doyle; Erik Mehlsen
- Website: www.thedeadsouth.com

The Dead South is a folk-bluegrass musical ensemble based in Regina, Saskatchewan, Canada. The band was initially formed in 2012 as a quartet by Nate Hilts (vocals, guitar, mandolin), Scott Pringle (guitar, mandolin, vocals), Danny Kenyon (cello, bass, vocals) and Colton Crawford (banjo). Crawford left the band in 2015 and was replaced by studio musician Eliza Mary Doyle before rejoining in 2018.

The band played live venues before releasing their debut five-song 2013 EP, The Ocean Went Mad and We Were to Blame. Their 2014 album Good Company was released by German label Devil Duck Records, and led to significant overseas touring for the next two years. The album's single "In Hell, I'll Be in Good Company", and its accompanying video on YouTube, are credited with contributing to the breakthrough release for the band.

The Dead South have released four studio albums: Good Company (2014), Illusion and Doubt (2016), Sugar & Joy (Six Shooter Records, 2019), Chains & Stakes (2024), three EPs – The Ocean Went Mad and We Were to Blame (2013), and Easy Listening for Jerks Pt. 1 and Pt. 2 (both Six Shooter Records, 2022), and a live album, Served Live (Six Shooter Records, 2020).

== History ==
=== Formation ===
Nate Hilts and Danny Kenyon came up with the idea for a "rockin' stompin' bluegrass band" in 2012 while playing together in a short-lived alternative grunge band. After the grunge band's demise, Colton Crawford and Scott Pringle, who learned banjo and mandolin respectively, joined Hilts and Kenyon to form the Dead South

=== The Ocean Went Mad and We Were to Blame (2013) ===
While the band played various venues, they would sell what would eventually become their self-released EP The Ocean Went Mad and We Were to Blame.

In his review of the EP, Jamie Funk of Divide and Conquer Music was initially unsure if he could handle banjo picking in every song, but ended up enjoying it. The five songs offered in the EP reminded Funk of alternative bands attempting to play bluegrass music and succeeding beyond expectations. While most of the songs are classically "knee-slapping hoedown" bluegrass, other songs bear some similarities to alternative songs from the 1990s.

=== Good Company, touring success, departure of Crawford (2014–2015) ===
The Dead South's debut studio album Good Company was released in 2014 through the German record label Devil Duck Records, and led to extensive touring in Canada and Europe. The album contains a total of 14 tracks, including a rendition of Banjo Odyssey, which previously appeared on The Ocean Went Mad and We Were to Blame.

Additionally, The Dead South received in 2015 the "Road Gold" certification from the Canadian Independent Music Association (CIMA) for over 25,000 ticket sales in a 12 month period. In presenting the award, CIMA President Stuart Johnston noted that the certification was given to recognize the talent and hard-working nature of the touring band.

In October 2016, a music video for "In Hell, I'll Be in Good Company" was released onto YouTube, retroactively fueling interest in Good Company. Though the song and respective album were released in 2015, they appeared in the Top 50 on the Billboard music charts and on the Top 20 on U.S. iTunes overall chart during December 2017. It is The Dead South's most viewed video by a considerable margin, with over 440 million views.

Rachel Freitas of MusicExistence notes that the album's second track, "Achilles", "has the signature banjo sound that The Dead South are known for, but the instrumentation is a bit lighter. What one will find quickly while listening to the LP is that The Dead South are master storytellers that really know how to bring a song to life".

The album Good Company achieved Gold Status in Canada, while "In Hell, I'll Be in Good Company" achieved Gold Status in the USA and Platinum Status in Canada.

The band toured extensively in Canada and Europe. Crawford left the band in 2015, and Eliza Mary Doyle, a noted solo and studio musician, was hired to fill the vacancy.

==== "Banjo Odyssey" Controversy ====
The lyrical content of Good Company song "Banjo Odyssey" was questioned from the time of its release, though would become more so following later allegations against Danny Kenyon. In an August 2014 Facebook post, the band said: "The song is a satirical, tongue-in-cheek reference to the bluegrass genre and tells a story about two cousins who engage in a relationship. We sincerely apologize to anyone who has been hurt or offended by these lyrics, as the last thing we would want to do is offend anyone. Obviously, we do not condone rape or violence, and "Banjo Odyssey" (like many of our songs) is written as a story, and not as something to be taken literally."

=== Illusion & Doubt, return of Crawford (2016–2019) ===
Illusion & Doubt was the band's second album, and was noted for its eccentric lyricism, and unusual musical influences, including its use of a cello. Particular attention was brought to the African-American origins of its sound, with Mark Johnson of Americana UK summarised the album by writing "Bluegrass? How about blackgrass?"

Amanda Hathers, on CanadianBeats, opines that, while the album provides "the traditional folk / country experience, chock full of banjo plucking, twang, and impressive harmonies, the band's ability to make the music entertaining and engaging is impressive. "Boots", the album's first track, begins soft and quiet before picking up speed before its end. "Miss Mary" in particular, serves as an atypical and surprising example of folk music as interpreted by The Dead South and "Hard Day" showcases Hilts' grit and power as vocalist."

Apart from Illusion and Doubt peaking at number five on the U.S. Billboard Bluegrass chart, it also entered the Top 30 on the U.S. Country iTunes Chart.

The band received a Juno Award for Juno Award for Traditional Roots Album of the Year in 2018 for Illusion & Doubt.

By March 2019, Good Company and Illusion and Doubt had sold 90,000 physical copies, and The Dead South's songs had a total of 55 million streams on Spotify.

After almost two years of absence from the band, Crawford returned to the lineup starting with the 'Voices in Your Head' tour in mid-2018, replacing Doyle. On tour, Danny Kenyon was occasionally replaced on cello by Erik Mehlsen, owing to Kenyon's career in engineering.

=== Sugar & Joy (2019–2020) ===
Sugar & Joy expanded upon the imagery and unconventional composition in Illusion and Doubt. The album was very well received critically, reaching #1 on the American bluegrass charts. Peter Churchill of Americana U.K. gave the album a 9 / 10, writing "There is a feeling, when first listening to the album, of anticipation, of wondering in what direction these bunch of outrageously talented musicians might head with the next track. The only consistent here is the quality and the sheer infectiousness of the music."

Chris Conaton of PopMatters gave it an 8 / 10, praising the diversity of the themes and the manner in which it incorporated different styles of music: "Sugar and Joy shows there's a lot of life in the corner of roots music where playing loud and fast while also leaving room for slower, more nuanced songs is considered a great combination. It's nice to hear an album that embraces the core tenets of 21st century Americana (or Canadiana, in the Dead South's case) while still doing their own thing. Sugar and Joy is one of the most entertaining albums I've heard in 2019."

The Dead South won Group of the Year at the 2019 Canadian Independent Music Awards, or "Indies", on 11 May 2019. The Dead South again received a Juno Award for best Traditional Roots Album of the Year in 2020 for Sugar & Joy, and performed via livestream during the virtual award ceremony.

=== Kenyon sexual misconduct allegations, departure and rejoining (2020–2021) ===
In July 2020, allegations surfaced on the Victims Voices Regina Instagram accusing Danny Kenyon of sexual misconduct. On 19 August 2020, he left the band.

Following the allegations, Six Shooter Records, who represent The Dead South, released a statement on 19 August 2020, saying they are discussing the song "Banjo Odyssey" which had caused earlier controversy, and "our responsibility as a record label with respect to both artistic expression and social responsibility. We feel it is important to allow the time for a thoughtful and thorough process before taking action." The band also said on the same day that it "is opposed to, and does not condone, harmful behaviour of any kind" and undertook to support victims organizations, discuss the impact of "Banjo Odyssey", implement training for band and crew and create a code of conduct.

On 18 June 2021, the band announced that Kenyon had rejoined.

=== Easy Listening for Jerks Pt. 1 and 2 (2022–2023) ===
In October 2021, it was announced that The Dead South would be releasing a double EP Easy Listening for Jerks, Pt. 1 and Easy Listening for Jerks, Pt. 2 which has a scheduled release date of 4 March 2022. They are covers EPs which are described as "The Carter Family meets Addams Family". Part 1 has their bluegrass takes on classics such as "You Are My Sunshine", "Keep on the Sunny Side", and The Country Gentlemen's "Matterhorn". Part 2 is from their pre-show playlist which includes covers of The Doors, System of a Down, Cold War Kids, and The Misfits. This double EP release has all four members taking turns on vocals.

On 7 October 2021, they released the first single "You Are My Sunshine" along with the accompanying music video. On 11 November, they released their next single which is their cover of The Doors' People Are Strange along with the accompanying video.

On 8 June 2022, the Western Canadian Music Awards nominations were announced. The Dead South were nominated in the category of Recording of the Year.

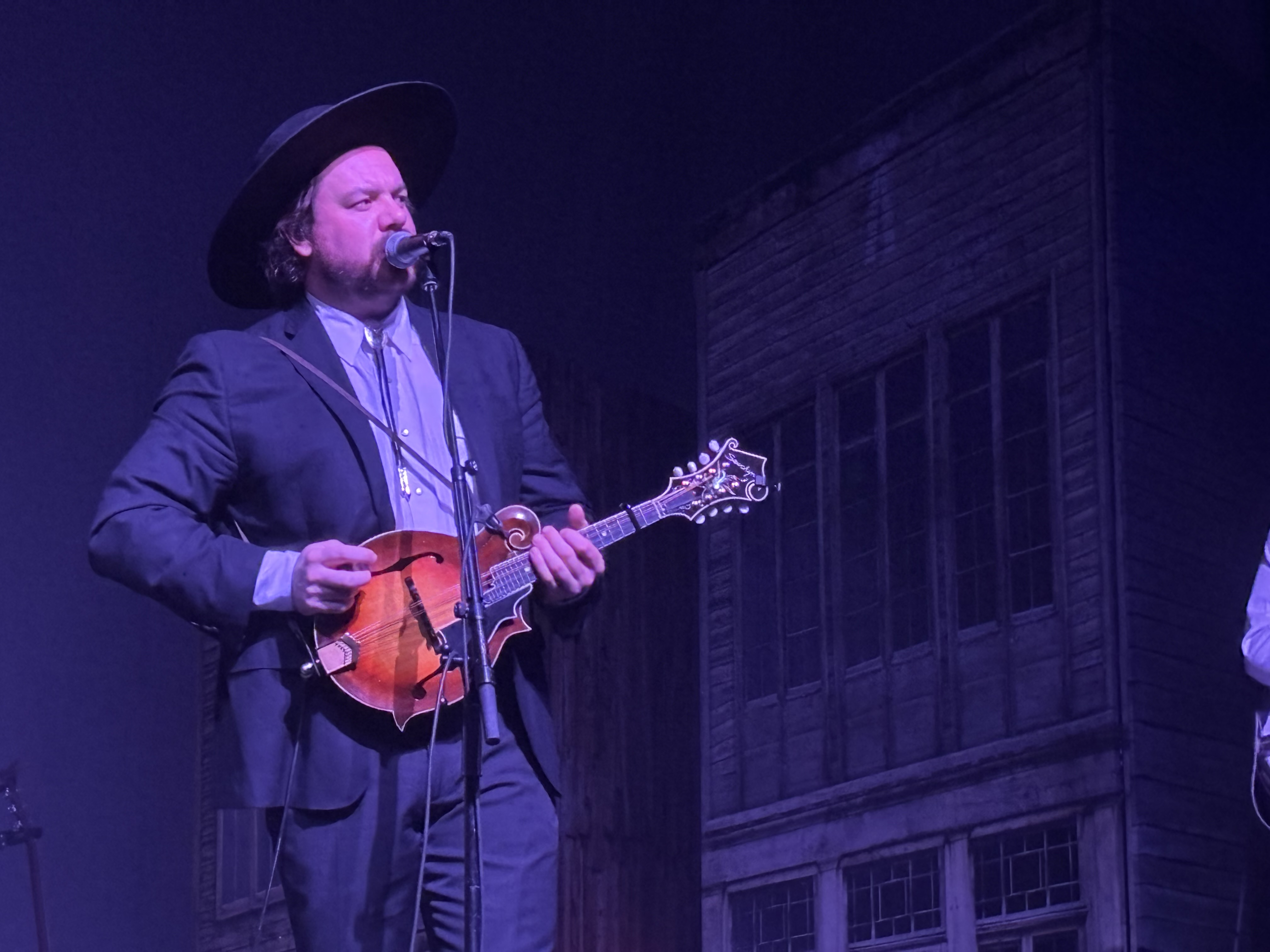
Nate Hilts performs with The Dead South at Franklin Music Hall in Philadelphia on 16 February 2024.

=== Chains & Stakes (2024–present) ===
On 9 February 2024, The Dead South released their fourth studio album, Chains & Stakes. The album was recorded at Panoram Studios in Mexico City between 1–14 May 2023, and released by Six Shooter Records. The album was produced by Jimmy Nutt and The Dead South, engineered by Cody Simmons and Jimmy Nutt with additional engineering by Mario David Lopez Mata, Mario Alberto Frias Corona, and Gabriel Leal Ascencio. Chains & Stakes was mixed at The NuttHouse Recording Studio in Sheffield, Alabama by Jimmy Nutt.

On 16 April 2025, they released a single titled "Joey", a cover of Concrete Blonde's song "Joey" (1990) written by Johnette Napolitano.

=== Silence, Please(2026-present) ===
On October 28, on the official The Dead South Youtube, a video entitled "So We Begin: A New Dead South Era Arrives" with Nate Hilts walking down a road. He begins singing "Oh the boys are coming,The boys are coming to town.Oh the boys are coming. Coming back to play in town " The vocals repeat as Scott Pringle, Colton "Crawdaddy" Crawford, and Danny Kenyon enter from the left and right to join in unison. At the end of the short video, the title fo the new album "Silence, Please" and the release date of March 5, 2027, released on SixShooter Records.

Additionally, at roughly noon Eastern time, another video was uploaded with what appears to be the first single entitled "Butter My Lover".

== Musical style and influence ==
The band have referred to themselves as "Mumford and Sons' evil twins", a nod to their dark and often violent interpretation of the "aesthetic of old western pioneers". Freitas of MusicExistence notes the "evil twin" comparison, but considers that, with Good Company, the band stands on its own merit in the folk world. Hilts and Kenyon had been listening to bluegrass bands Trampled by Turtles and Old Crow Medicine Show before forming their own band. They agreed that they wanted to perform their own version of traditional folk and bluegrass. Reviewer Timothy Monger on AllMusic considers that tradition to be "a gritty punk ethos with traditional bluegrass and old-time string band music"

A review of Good Company on Sputnik Music, notes that the band includes songs about the usual: Lovin', cheatin', killin', and drinkin'." Sputnik Music also points out that the band's clothing style of ordinary white shirts, black trousers, black suspenders, and the occasional flat-brimmed hat is often mimicked by their fans.

Sarah Murphy says on Exclaim.ca that the band's injection of folk and bluegrass sounds with a "punk rock ethos (not to mention a banjo player who's a self-proclaimed metalhead), the band bring a fresh perspective to classic genres."

Reviewer James Cooke suggests on MusicCrowns.org that the band's "gritty vocals, aggressive guitar strumming, mandolin chops, banjo licks, and a steady kick drum to fuse it all together" deliver a unique sound that doesn't exactly fit the traditional definition of bluegrass.

Cooke notes that the Dead South's release of "In Hell, I'll Be in Good Company" is labelled as bluegrass, but has caused fans to question whether the label is appropriate or not. He argues that since bluegrass has been influenced by Irish, Scottish, and African American music, the definition of bluegrass as a genre has become blurred.

The band's own website describes their music more broadly, not sticking to any one genre in particular. "It doesn’t really matter what you call their music - progressive bluegrass, alternative Americana, country, folk and western, what matters is that this is theirs, and people from all different backgrounds, beliefs, experiences, languages and ages love it."

== Band members ==
Current members

- Nate Hilts (lead vocals, guitar, mandolin) (2012–present)
- Scott Pringle (guitar, mandolin, vocals) (2012–present)
- Colton Crawford (banjo) (2012–2015, 2018–present)
- Danny Kenyon (cello, vocals) (2012–2020, 2021–present)

Former members

- Eliza Mary Doyle (banjo) (2016–2018)
- Erik Mehlsen (cello) (2015–2018)

== Discography ==
The Dead South discography
- Studio albums: 4
- EPs: 4
- Live albums: 1
- Singles: 7
- Music videos: 16

=== Albums ===
==== Studio albums ====
Title	Album details	Peak chart positions
Title	Album details	US Bluegrass
Good Company	Released: 2014; Formats: CD, vinyl, digital download, streaming; Label: Devil Duck	—
Illusion & Doubt	Released: 18 November 2016; Formats: CD, vinyl, digital download, streaming; Label: Curve Music	5
Sugar & Joy	Released: 11 October 2019; Formats: CD, vinyl, digital download, streaming; Label: Six Shooter	1
Chains & Stakes	Released: 9 February 2024; Formats: CD, digital download, streaming; Label: Six Shooter	1

==== Live albums ====
Title	Album details	Peak chart positions
Title	Album details	US Bluegrass
Served Live	Released: 29 January 2021; Label: Six Shooter; Format: Digital download, streaming	1

=== Extended plays ===
Title	Details
The Ocean Went Mad and We Were to Blame	Released: 29 June 2013; Format: Digital download, streaming; Label: Self-released
OurVinyl Sessions	Released: 2020; Label: OurVinyl; Format: Streaming
Easy Listening for Jerks Pt. 1	Released: 4 March 2022; Label: Six Shooter; Format: Digital download, streaming
Easy Listening for Jerks Pt. 2	Released: 4 March 2022; Label: Six Shooter; Format: Digital download, streaming

=== Singles ===
Title	Year	Album
"This Little Light of Mine" / "House of the Rising Sun"	2020	Non-album single
"You Are My Sunshine"	2021	Easy Listening for Jerks Pt. 1
"People Are Strange"	2021	Easy Listening for Jerks Pt. 2
"Will the Circle Be Unbroken"	2022	Easy Listening for Jerks Pt. 1
"Tiny Wooden Box"	2023	Chains & Stakes
"A Little Devil"	2023	Chains & Stakes
"20 Mile Jump"	2024	Chains & Stakes
"Joey"	2025	Joey

=== Music videos ===
Year	Title	Album
2013	"Long Gone"	Good Company
2014	"The Recap"	Good Company
2015	"Honey You"	Good Company
2016	"Banjo Odyssey"	Good Company
2016	"In Hell I'll Be In Good Company"	Good Company
2017	"Delirium"	Illusion & Doubt
2018	"Miss Marry"	Illusion & Doubt
2018	"Boots"	Illusion & Doubt
2019	"Diamond Ring"	Sugar & Joy
2020	"Fat Little Killer Boy"	Sugar & Joy
2021	"You Are My Sunshine"	Easy Listening for Jerks Pt. 1
2021	"People Are Strange"	Easy Listening for Jerks Pt. 2
2022	"Chop Suey"	Easy Listening for Jerks Pt. 2
2023	"Tiny Wooden Box"	Chains & Stakes
2024	"A Little Devil"	Chains & Stakes
2024	"Yours to Keep"	Chains & Stakes

=== Other appearances ===
Year	Song	Album
2018	"One Dying and a Burying"	King of the Road: A Tribute to Roger Miller

== Awards and nominations ==
The Dead South awards and nominations
Awards and nominations
Award	Wins	Nominations
Best of Regina	4	4
Canadian Independent Music Association	1	1
Canadian Independent Music Awards	1	1
Juno Awards	2	3
Western Canadian Music Awards	0	1

Totals (Note: Certain award groups do not simply award one winner. They acknowledge several different recipients, have runners-up, and have third place. Since this is a specific recognition and is different from losing an award, runner-up mentions are considered wins in this award tally. For simplification and to avoid errors, each award in this list has been presumed to have had a prior nomination.)
- Wins: 8
- Nominations: 10

Year	Nominated work	Event	Award	Result	Ref
2015	The Dead South	Canadian Independent Music Association	Road Gold	Won	
2018	The Dead South	Juno Awards	Breakthrough Group of the Year	Nominated	
2018	Illusion and Doubt	Juno Awards	Traditional Roots Album of the Year	Won	
2019	The Dead South	Canadian Independent Music Awards	Group of the Year	Won	
2020	Sugar & Joy	Juno Awards	Traditional Roots Album of the Year	Won	
2020	The Dead South	Best of Regina	Best Band	Won	
2020	The Dead South	Best of Regina	Best Concert: Sask Artists	Won	
2020	Sugar & Joy	Best of Regina	Best Album	Won	
2022	The Dead South	Western Canadian Music Awards	Recording of the Year	Nominated	
2022	The Dead South	Best of Regina	Best Band	Won	

== Pop culture ==
- "In Hell, I'll Be in Good Company" was used in season 2, episode 6 end credits of The Umbrella Academy.
- "In Hell, I'll Be in Good Company" was used in season 3, episode 1 of American Gods.
- "In Hell, I'll Be in Good Company" is playable as a random song via the jukebox in Fort Hope, in Turtle Rock Studios game Back 4 Blood.
- The score for "In Hell, I'll Be in Good Company" was used in season 1, episode 2, and season 1, episode 6 of The Letter for the King
- "The Recap" is used during the chase scene at the end of season 1, episode 8, of Tin Star and continues into the credits.
