= La Nef =

Canadian early music group

La Nef (French: The Nave (of a ship or church or a medieval boat) is a French-Canadian early music performance group founded in Quebec in 1991. The founding members were Sylvain Bergeron, the guitar and musical director; and Claire Gignac, the contralto, recorder, theatrical director; and Viviane LeBlanc, soprano.

Their first show was Musiques pour Jeanne la Folle ("Music for Joan the Mad"), later recorded as a CD for Dorian Recordings.

== Discography ==
- Music for Joan the Mad (Dorian)
- Perceval - La quête du Graal vol.1 La Nef Daniel Taylor (Dorian)
- Perceval - The Quest For The Grail Vol.2 La Nef (Dorian)
- Garden of Earthly Delights (Dorian)
- Montségur: La Tragedie Cathare (Dorian)
- Musiques des Montagnes - Music of Greece. Claire Gignac (Atma)
- Oikan Ayns Bethlehem - Celtic Christmas songs. Meredith Hall (Atma)
- La traverse miraculeuse Les Charbonniers de l'enfer & La Nef (Atma)
- The Battle of Killiecrankie. Matthew White (Atma)
- Dowland in Dublin - with Michael Slattery, tenor. (Atma)
- Trobairitz - Poems of Women Troubadours - with Shannon Mercer, music by Seán Dagher. (Analekta)
