= 13th Canadian Folk Music Awards =

2017 music awards ceremony

- Date: November 19, 2017
- Location: Bronson Centre, Ottawa, Ontario
- Country: Canada
- Website: folkawards.ca

The 13th Canadian Folk Music Awards were presented in Ottawa, Ontario on November 19, 2017.

== Nominees and recipients ==
Recipients are listed first and highlighted in boldface.

Traditional Album	Contemporary Album
**Cassie and Maggie, The Willow Collection**; Jayme Stone, Folklife; André Brunet, La grosse maison rouge; Còig, Rove; Jenny Whiteley, The Original Jenny Whiteley	**Abigail Lapell, Hide Nor Hair**; The Fretless, Bird's Nest; Tomato Tomato, I Go Where You Go; Braden Gates, Much Rather Be Sleeping; Leif Vollebekk, Twin Solitude
Children's Album	Traditional Singer
**Fred Penner, Hear the Music**; Jessie Farrell, Chirp Chirp Happy; Ginalina, Home Is Family; Stella Swanson and the Rosie Joyfuls, Pants on Backwards; Madame Diva and Micah le jeune voyageur, Zing-E-Zing!	**Hannah Shira Naiman, Know the Mountain**; Dave Penny, All Turned Around; Mélisande Gélinas-Fauteux, Les millésimes; Maggie MacDonald, The Willow Collection; Sarah Jane Scouten, When the Bloom Falls From the Rose
Contemporary Singer	Instrumental Solo Artist
**Stephen Fearing, Every Soul's a Sailor**; Oh Susanna, A Girl in Teen City; Abigail Lapell, Hide Nor Hair; Lisa LeBlanc, Why You Wanna Leave, Runaway Queen?; Coco Love Alcorn, Wonderland	**André Brunet, La grosse maison rouge**; Don Ross, A Million Brazilian Civilians; Roberto López, Criollo Electric; Glenn Chatten, Dragonfly; Maneli Jamal, The Mardom Movement
Instrumental Group	English Songwriter
**Scott Macmillan and Colin Grant, Good2go**; Natalie MacMaster and Donnell Leahy, A Celtic Family Christmas; The Fretless, Bird's Nest; Beyond the Pale, Ruckus; MacIsaac and MacKenzie, The Bay Street Sessions	**Ken Yates, Huntsville**; Oh Susanna, A Girl in Teen City; Stephen Fearing, Every Soul's a Sailor; Scott Cook, Further Down the Line; Amelia Curran, Watershed
French Songwriter	Aboriginal Songwriter
**Luc de Larochellière, Autre monde**; Patrice Michaud, Almanach; Vivianne Roy, Katrine Noël, Julie Aubé (Les Hay Babies), La 4ième dimension (version longue); Philippe B, La grande nuit vidéo; Catherine Durand, La pluie entre nous	**Twin Flames, Signal Fire**; Lisa Muswagon, Buffalo and Rabbits; Julian Taylor, Kinnie Starr, John Parente and Bill Bell, Desert Star; Cindy Paul, The Flight; Desiree Dorion, Tough Street
Vocal Group	Ensemble
**Coco Méliès, The Riddles**; The Big East, Hungry Ghosts; The Bombadils, New Shoes; Twin Flames, Signal Fire; Cassie and Maggie, The Willow Collection	**Mama's Broke, Count the Wicked**; Silent Winters, Fireworks and a Small Brigade; 100 mile house, Hiraeth; The Jerry Cans, Inuusiq; Cassie and Maggie, The Willow Collection
Solo Artist	World Solo Artist
**Leeroy Stagger, Love Versus**; Stephen Fearing, Every Soul's a Sailor; Zachary Lucky, Everywhere a Man Can Be; Beyries, Landing; Amelia Curran, Watershed	**Louis Simão, A Luz (The Light)**; Farnaz Ohadi and the Mashregh Ensemble, Bird Dance; Kelly Bado, Entre deux; Briga, Femme; Maneli Jamal, The Mardom Movement
World Group	New/Emerging Artist
**Kobo Town, Where the Galleon Sank**; MAZ, ID; Turkwaz, Nazar; Beyond the Pale, Ruckus; Twin Flames, Signal Fire	**Ken Yates, Huntsville**; Hidden Roots Collective, Come Up, Honey; Silent Winters, Fireworks and a Small Brigade; Braden Gates, Much Rather Be Sleeping; The Bombadils, New Shoes
Producer	Pushing the Boundaries
**Danny Michel and Rob Carli, Khlebnikov (Danny Michel)**; Jim Bryson, A Girl in Teen City (Oh Susanna); Stephen Fearing and David Travers-Smith, Every Soul's a Sailor (Stephen Fearing); Joel Plaskett, Solidarity (Bill and Joel Plaskett); Amelia Curran and Chris Stringer, Watershed (Amelia Curran)	**Danny Michel, Khlebnikov**; Shreem, Celtic Remixing; Mélisande (électrotrad), Les millésimes; Turkwaz, Nazar; Tanya Tagaq, Retribution
Young Performer	
**Moscow Apartment, Demo**; Quin Etheridge-Pedden, Embark; Keltie Monaghan, Someone Tell Her; The Wolfe, The Wolfe; John Muirhead, Yesterday's Smile	
