= Les Charbonniers de l'enfer =

Canadian a cappella folk music group

Les Charbonniers de l'Enfer
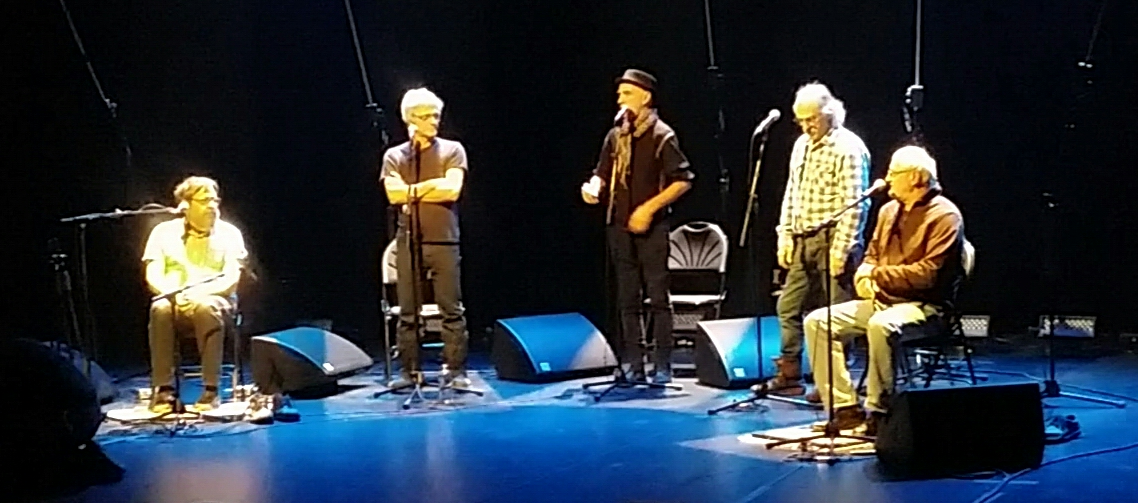
- Les Charbonniers de l'Enfer performing in 2018

Background information
- Origin: Quebec, Canada
- Genres: Folk music; traditional music
- Years active: 1994—present
- Labels: La Tribu
- Members: Michel Bordeleau; Michel Faubert; André Marchand; Normand Miron
- Past members: Jean-Claude Mirandette
- Website: lescharbonniersdelenfer.com

Les Charbonniers de l'Enfer are an a cappella folk music group formed in Quebec, Canada, in 1994.

== History ==
The group is part of a revival in interest in Quebec's folk music. It was formed by five experienced singers who have been part of the regional folk music scene for more than 30 years: Michel Faubert, Normand Miron, Jean-Claude Mirandette, Michel Bordeleau, and André Marchand. Their instrumental accompaniment is limited to the jaw harp and foot tapping. The musicians also work in other projects and the band's appearances are relatively rare. The group includes two former members of La Bottine Souriante (Bordeleau and Marchand).

On their 2010 album Nouvelles fréquentations (New Visits), Les Charbonniers de l'Enfer tackle a contemporary repertoire. This includes, among others, works by Neil Young, Félix Leclerc, Noir Désir, Daniel Lanois, Plume Latraverse, Steven "Cassonade" Faulkner, Daniel Lavoie, Florent Vollant, Dédé Fortin, the McGarrigle sisters, Marcel Martel, and Bertolt Brecht. This album earned them nominations from ADISQ as well as the Canadian Folk Music Awards.

In 2017, they released the album 25 ans de grande noirceur (25 Years of Great Darkness), a compilation of 13 songs selected from their complete repertoire.

Jean-Claude Mirandette died in 2019.

== Band members ==
Current

- Michel Bordeleau
- Michel Faubert
- André Marchand
- Normand Miron

Past

- Jean-Claude Mirandette

== Discography ==
- Chansons a cappella (1996)
- Wô (2002)
- En concert à la Tulippe : "En personne" (2005)
- À la grâce de Dieu (2007)
- La Traverse miraculeuse with La Nef (2008)
- Nouvelles fréquentations (2010)
- 25 ans de grande noirceur (2017)

=== Collaborations ===
- La sacrée rencontre (Gilles Vigneault and Les Charbonniers de l'enfer - 2007)

== Awards and recognition ==
- Félix Award – Album of the year – Traditional Music – for Wô (2003)
- Nomination: ADISQ – Best CD cover – for Wô (2003)
- Félix Award – Album of the year – Traditional Music – for En concert à la Tulippe : "En personne" (2006)
- Canadian Folk Music Awards Prize – Best Group of the Year (2007)
- Nomination: ADISQ – Album of the year – for À la grace de Dieu (2008)
- Félix Award – Album of the year – Traditional Music – La Nef & Les Charbonniers de l'Enfer (2009)
- Nomination: Canadian Folk Music Awards – Album of the Year – Contemporary Vocal Group of the Year – for Nouvelles fréquentations (2011)
- Nomination: ADISQ – Album of the year – Revivals, Performance of the year – for Nouvelles fréquentations (2011)
