= Camille Intson =

Canadian multidisciplinary artist

- Born: February 2, 1997 (age 29); Hamilton, Ontario
- Known for: Interdisciplinary arts; theatre and performance; music
- Website: camilleintson.com

Camille Intson, also known professionally as Camie, is a Canadian playwright, singer-songwriter, new media artist, and researcher.

== Personal life and education ==
Intson was born in February 1997 in Hamilton, Ontario, and was raised in Dundas, Ontario. She attended Westdale Secondary School and is an alum of the University of Western Ontario and the Royal Central School of Speech and Drama. Intson is currently pursuing her PhD at the University of Toronto Faculty of Information and resides between Toronto and Hamilton. She identifies as queer and uses she/her pronouns.

== Playwriting and performance ==
Intson's plays frequently touch on themes of queer female identity, sexuality, and intimacy, and the impact of emerging technologies on human relationships, often targeting younger generations of performers and audiences.

Her works have been awarded various honours, including a 2021 Tom Hendry Award (issued by the Playwrights Guild of Canada) for We All Got Lost, which also won the Best in Fringe, Best in Venue, and New Play Contest prizes at the 2019 Hamilton fringe theatre festival. Her short play Road was the inaugural winner of the Newmarket National 10 Minute Play Festival in 2017, and she was also the recipient of the 2018 Lillian Kroll Prize in Creative Writing (issued by the University of Western Ontario) for Marty and Joel and the Edge of Chaos. Intson was also shortlisted for the 2021 New Media Writing Prize's Opening Up Award for her online digital media work, betweenspace. As of late 2021, Intson is an artist-in-residence at Tarragon Theatre, where she is developing a new play, JANE.

Intson is the artistic director of Pantheon Projects, a Toronto and Hamilton-based queer and feminist intermedial performance and new media collective. The collective's mission is "to create new work that defies traditional theatrical form, foregrounds the integration of emerging technologies into live performance work, and uses intermedial forms of storytelling to tell distinctly queer and feminist stories for new generation audiences."

== Music ==
Intson frequently performs original music as a singer-songwriter under the pseudonym Camie. In October 2022, Intson received the Colleen Peterson Songwriting Award for her song "Winter", and was nominated for a 2023 Canadian Folk Music Award for her 2021 EP, troubadour. She was also the winner of a 2016 Hamilton Music Award in the "Rising Star" category.

Intson considers herself of the part of the alternative folk genre, which she has described as "traditional folk stylings imbued with contemporary synth and string textures". She often collaborates with Toronto-based producer and multi-instrumentalist, Mike Tompa.

== Plays ==
- JANE
- Patchface
- We All Got Lost
- The Last 48 (created with Rafaella Rosenberg)
- Road
- The Stock
- Marty and Joel and the Edge of Chaos

== Discography ==
- "Winter" (2021, Single)
- Troubadour (2021, EP)
- Renegade (acoustic) (2019, LP)
- Sharp Teeth (2019, LP)
- Songs From Worlds Past (2018, EP)
