= Abigail Lapell =

Canadian folk singer-songwriter

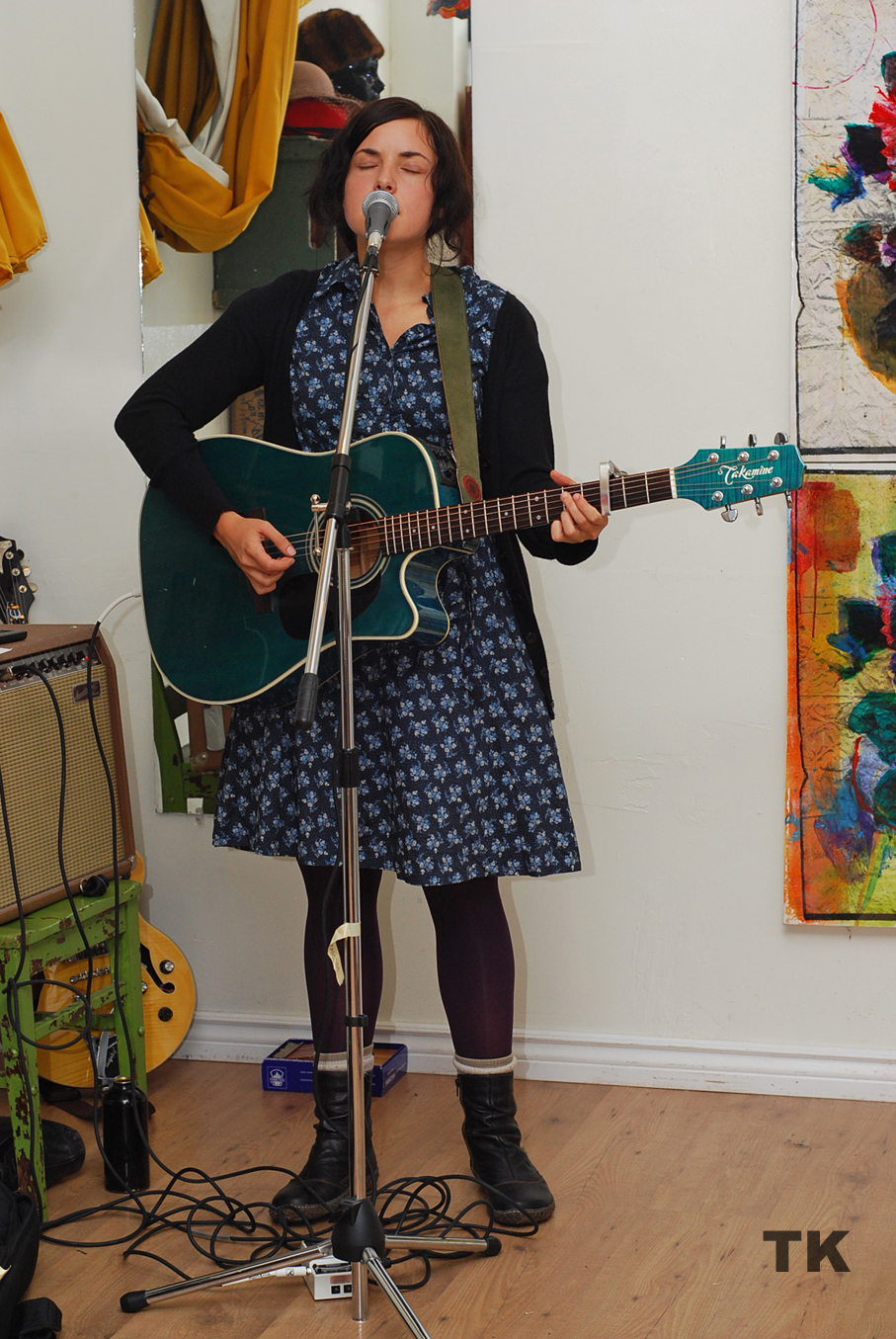
- Abigail Lapell in 2009.

Background information
- Origin: Toronto, Ontario, Canada
- Genre: Folk
- Occupations: Musician; singer-songwriter
- Instruments: Vocals; guitar; piano; harmonica

Abigail Lapell is a Canadian folk singer-songwriter, who won the Canadian Folk Music Award for Contemporary Album of the Year at the 13th Canadian Folk Music Awards in 2017 for her album Hide Nor Hair and again for English Songwriter of the Year at the 15th Canadian Folk Music Awards in 2020 for her album Getaway.

Based in Toronto, Ontario, Lapell released her debut album Great Survivor in 2011. In 2016, she won the Colleen Peterson Songwriting Award for her song "Jordan".

Hide Nor Hair, her second album, was released in 2017. In addition to her Contemporary Album win at the CFMAs, she was also a shortlisted finalist in the Contemporary Singer of the Year category.

Her 2024 album Anniversary featured several tracks recorded in collaboration with Great Lake Swimmers. The album received a Juno Award nomination for Contemporary Roots Album of the Year at the Juno Awards of 2025.

At the 20th Canadian Folk Music Awards in 2025, she won the award for Children's Album of the Year for her 2023 album Lullabies.

In 2026 she released Shadow Child, an album that included guest contributions by Jill Barber, Frazey Ford, Dana Sipos and Pharis Romero.

== Discography ==
- Great Survivor (2011)
- Hide Nor Hair (2017)
- Getaway (2019)
- Stolen Time (2022)
- Lullabies (2023)
- Anniversary (2024)
- Shadow Child (2026)
