= Celtic Colours =

Celtic music festival in Nova Scotia, Canada

Celtic Colours International Festival is a Celtic music festival held annually in October on Cape Breton Island in Nova Scotia, Canada.

First held in 1997, the festival has featured musicians from the Celtic world and attracted visitors to Cape Breton Island around the time of peak autumn colour. The Festival presents dozens of concerts on the island, an extensive line-up of workshops, a visual art series of exhibitions, and a nightly Festival Club. Artists have traveled from Scotland, Ireland, Wales, England, Brittany, Spain, Denmark, Germany, Norway, Cuba, and Sweden, as well as from across the United States and Canada.

== Locations ==
Concert venues are in cities across Cape Breton Island, including Sydney, the Fortress of Louisbourg National Historic Site, the Savoy Theater in Glace Bay, and the Strathspey Performing Arts Centre in Mabou. Other venues include fire halls, schools and community centres.

== Features and events ==
Workshops, offered in many aspects of Celtic and Gaelic culture, allow visitors and residents alike to get the hands-on experience they desire. Host communities around the island present workshops in Gaelic language and song, components of tradition, instrument instruction and traditional dance, as well as offering cultural tours, cèilidhs, and a lecture series. They also organize an extensive array of community events including meals and dances.

The Festival will also offer guided tours and hikes, markets, art exhibitions and community meals.

The Festival Club at the Gaelic College in St. Ann's opens as the evening concerts are closing, offering an opportunity for Festival artists to perform in a more informal setting, or to get a session in with friends and colleagues from near and far. Performance is by invitation only and depends upon artist availability on any given night.
