= The Good Lovelies =

Canadian musical group

Good Lovelies
- Origin: Toronto, Ontario, Canada
- Genres: Americana, folk
- Instruments: Acoustic guitar, Electric guitar, Banjo, Keyboard, Bass, Percussion
- Years active: 2006–present
- Label: Outside Music
- Members: Caroline Brooks; Kerri Ough; Sue Passmore
- Website: goodlovelies.com

Good Lovelies are a Canadian Roots/Americana harmony trio, consisting of Caroline Brooks, Kerri Ough and Sue Passmore. At their core they can be described as folk-roots, with tinges of pop and western swing.

== History ==
The group's three members, Brooks from Whitby, Ough from Port Hope and Passmore from Cobourg, were all performing as solo artists in the Toronto area when they came together to do a show at Toronto's Gladstone Hotel on December 15, 2006.

Forming an instant bond, the three continued working together, releasing their debut EP, Oh My, in 2007, in time for their debut on the folk festival scene at the Ottawa Folk Festival that summer. They released their first full-length album, Good Lovelies, in 2009, and followed up with the Christmas-themed album Under the Mistletoe later the same year. The latter would support the beginning of a long tradition of Christmas tours that continues to present.

Their album Good Lovelies won the Juno Award for Roots & Traditional Album of the Year – Group at the 2010 Juno Awards.

Good Lovelies performed at the Australian National Folk Festival in 2011 during their first overseas tour, playing songs from their 2011 album Let the Rain Fall; they also performed in Newcastle upon Tyne, England, playing at the Evolution Festival, UK, and other venues around the North East.

In 2012, the band recorded a live concert at Revolution Recording in Toronto, including a performance of their beloved version of Leonard Cohen's Hallelujah. The recording was released as a 16-track CD called, Live at Revolution, which even includes three of their most told stage stories at the time.

2013 saw the Good Lovelies deviate from their regular Christmas tour plans in order to join Stuart McLean on the annual Vinyl Cafe Christmas tour. In 2015, the group release the 5-song EP Winter's Calling, which features a rendition of Winter Song requested by McLean for the Vinyl Cafe tour, as well as their cover of Gordon Lightfoot's, Song for a Winter's Night, performed as a waltz.

In February 2018, Good Lovelies released Shapeshifters, which featured a shift from their usual folk to a more pop music sound. They recorded a track on Fred Penner's Juno Award-winning album, Hear the Music. Later that year they performed at Massey Hall in Toronto, were nominated for a Canadian Folk Music Award, received a SOCAN #1 Award for their song I See Gold.

We Will Never Be The Same was released in 2023. Produced by Joshua Van Tassel and Christine Bougie, the album received a nomination for Contemporary Roots Album at the 2024 Juno Awards, and was awarded Producer of the Year and Vocal Group of the year at the 2025 Canadian Folk Music Awards.

In April 2024, Armenian-Canadian children's musician and author, Raffi released a collaborative album with Good Lovelies, titled Penny Penguin, which was awarded the Juno for Children's Album of the Year in March 2025.

== Discography ==
- Oh My! (EP, 2007)
- Good Lovelies (2009)
- Under the Mistletoe (2009)
- Let the Rain Fall (2011)
- Live at Revolution (2012)
- Burn the Plan (2015)
- Winter's Calling (EP, 2015)
- Shapeshifters (2018)
- Evergreen (2019)
- B-Sides (2021)
- We Will Never Be The Same (2023)
- Penny Penguin (with Raffi) (2024)
