= Gabrielle Papillon =

- Origin: Halifax, Nova Scotia, Canada
- Instruments: Vocals, Guitar, Keyboard
- Labels: Little Bug Records, The state51 Conspiracy
- Website: www.gabriellepapillon.com

Gabrielle Strasfeld, known professionally as Gabrielle Papillon, is a Canadian musician and songwriter based in Halifax, Nova Scotia. To date she has recorded seven albums.

== Career ==
In 2015, she released her fifth album The Tempest of Old. It charted on Canadian national campus radio, CBC Radio 2, and the international iTunes Singer-Songwriter charts and won the Music Nova Scotia Award for Recording of the Year. She also began working with veteran music manager Peter Jenner. She released her sixth album Keep the Fire in 2017. The album was nominated for three East Coast Music Awards, four Music Nova Scotia Awards, and a Canadian Folk Music Award, winning the Music Nova Scotia award for SOCAN Songwriter of the Year in 2018. Papillon's seventh album Shout was released in 2019.

Songs from Papillon's albums have appeared in various films and television shows in Canada, the United States, and Australia including Rookie Blue (USA) and This Life (CAN).

Tom Power, host of Canadian Broadcasting Corporation's 'q', has called Papillon "one of the finest songwriters in the country right now". In an interview for the Globe and Mail, writer, director, and actor Sarah Polley said of Papillon "She is an incredible songwriter and has a transcendent voice."

== Discography ==
=== Albums ===
Year	Work	Label
2001	Songs For a Rainy Day	Little Bug Records
2010	The Wanderer	Little Bug Records
2011	The Currency of Poetry	Little Bug Records
2012	Little Bug	Little Bug Records
2015	The Tempest of Old	Little Bug Records
2017	Keep the Fire	The state51 Conspiracy
2019	Shout	The state51 Conspiracy
