= Daniel Ledwell =

Canadian record producer and multi-instrumentalist

Daniel Ledwell is a Canadian record producer and multi-instrumentalist.

== Music career ==
In 2008, Ledwell produced his debut solo album, Two Over Seven in his home studio. It was released on Emm Gryner's record label Dead Daisy Records. Since then, Ledwell has also produced albums for such musicians as Jenn Grant, Don Brownrigg, Heather Green, Fortunate Ones, Quiet Parade, Gabrielle Papillon, Lennie Gallant, and Justin Rutledge. He was named producer of the year at the East Coast Music Awards in 2013 and again in 2014.

In 2024 he appeared as a guest musician on New Kind of Familiar, the second album by Clever Hopes.

== Art and design ==
Ledwell, who is originally from Charlottetown, received a fine arts degree from Mount Allison University, where he met his former bandmates in In-Flight Safety.

In addition to his musical work, he is also a painter and designer, and has designed album covers for many musicians. He also illustrated I Am an Islander, a book by his brother, comedian Patrick Ledwell.

== Personal life ==
He lives in Halifax, Nova Scotia, and is married to singer-songwriter Jenn Grant.

Daniel and Patrick Ledwell's father was poet and university professor Frank Ledwell.
