= Jenn Grant =

Canadian singer-songwriter (born 1980)

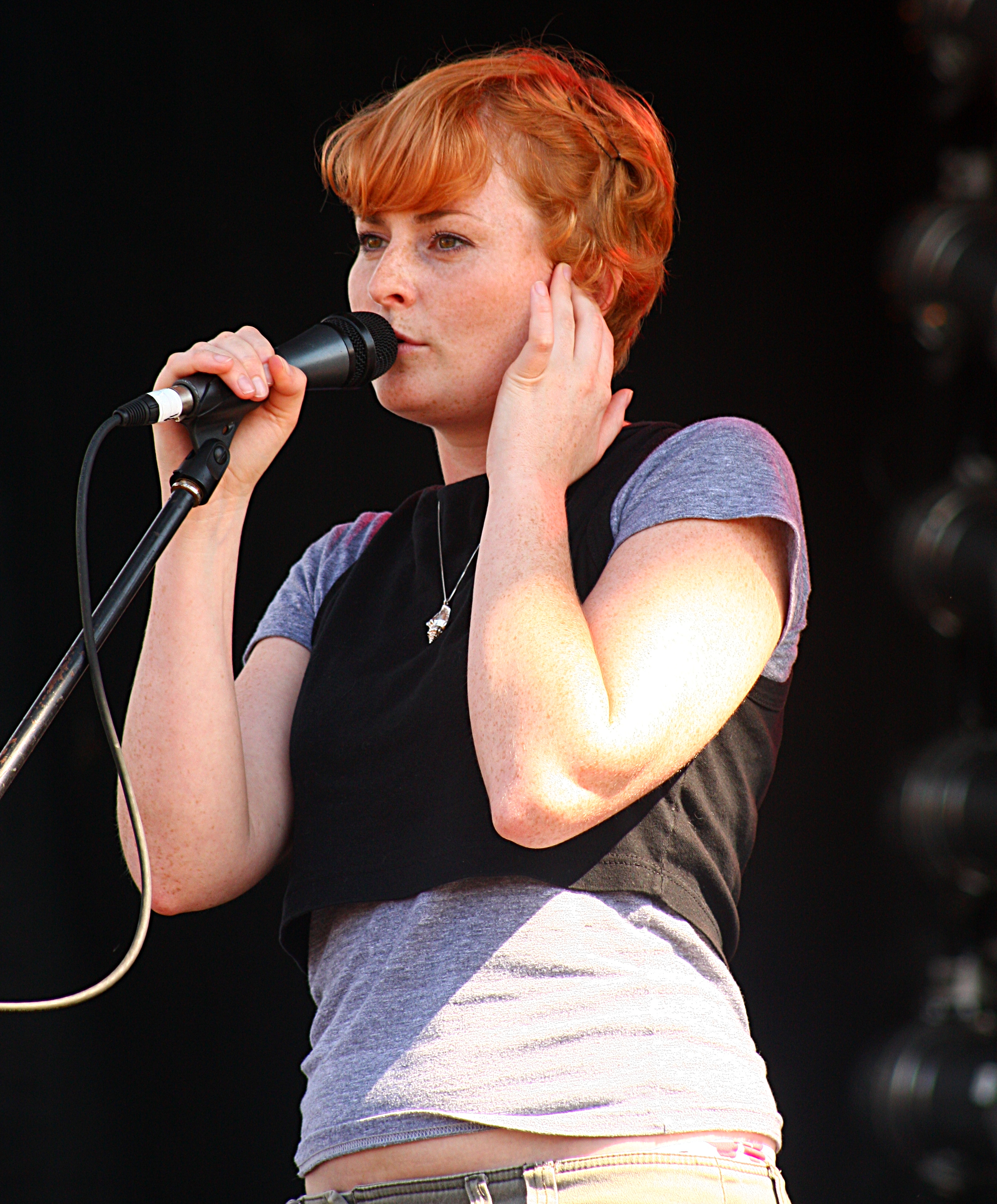
- Grant performing in 2008

Background information
- Born: August 20, 1980 (age 46); Charlottetown, Prince Edward Island
- Origin: Halifax, Nova Scotia, Canada
- Genres: Pop; Folk; Disco
- Occupation: Singer-songwriter
- Years active: 2004–present
- Labels: Six Shooter (2007–2012); Outside Music (2014–present)
- Website: Jenn Grant

Jenn Grant (born August 20, 1980) is a Canadian folk pop singer-songwriter based in Halifax, Nova Scotia.

== Career ==
Grant performed as a musician for a time in her early teens, but stopped due to a bout of stage fright. She did not return to performing until her early 20s when she played some shows with The Heavy Blinkers. She then released an independent EP, Jenn Grant and Goodbye Twentieth Century, in 2005.

She collaborated on her debut album, Orchestra for the Moon, with such artists as Ron Sexsmith, the Heavy Blinkers, Matt Mays and Jill Barber, and later toured Germany and Canada in support of the album, including as an opening act for The Weakerthans.

She later began recording her second album, Echoes, on a farm in rural Ontario in 2008. The album was produced by Jonathan Goldsmith and engineered by Walter Sobczak at The Studio at Puck's Farm. Her voice was also featured in the song "We Made a Pact" by Hey Rosetta on their 2008 album Into Your Lungs (and around in your heart and on through your blood). Echoes was released in 2009.

In 2010 and 2011, she collaborated with Buck 65 on several tracks, including "Paper Airplane", "Cold Steel Drum", "Days Go By" and a cover of Leonard Cohen's "Who By Fire", on his 20 Odd Years series of EPs. Late in 2010, she also released a four-song EP, Songs for Siigoun, which featured a cover of John Denver's "Annie's Song".

She began the writing process for her third studio album, Honeymoon Punch, in Egypt in 2010; it was released on January 7, 2011. The album represented something of an evolution from Grant's established folk-pop style, introducing a greater emphasis on keyboards and moving her toward a more upbeat dance-pop style which Grant described as having been strongly influenced by Kate Bush. The album was recorded and produced by Grant's now husband Daniel Ledwell. The album was nominated for Adult Alternative Album of the Year at the 2012 Juno Awards.

Grant's fourth studio album, The Beautiful Wild, was released September 25, 2012, on Six Shooter Records. The album was inspired in part by Grant's mother, who was suffering from a terminal illness during the album's recording. The album was produced by Grant's husband, Daniel Ledwell. Guest musicians on the album include Ledwell, Erin Costello, Old Man Luedecke, Tanya Davis and Rose Cousins.

The album won the East Coast Music Award for Pop Recording of the Year in 2013.

Grant's fifth album, Compostela, was released October 21, 2014, on Outside Music.

The album features collaborations with Buck 65, Sarah Harmer, Ron Sexsmith, Rose Cousins, Don Kerr, Doug Paisley, Kim Harris, Stewart Legere, Justin Rutledge and Rachel Sermanni. Two tracks, the Buck 65 collaboration "Spades" and the Stewart Legere collaboration "No One's Gonna Love You (Quite Like I Do)", appeared alongside four non-album tracks on her EP Clairvoyant, released earlier in 2014.

The album was a shortlisted Juno Award nominee for Adult Alternative Album of the Year at the Juno Awards of 2015.

Grant's sixth album, Paradise, was released on March 3, 2017. Grant and husband Daniel Ledwell took a year in their home studio to craft an album of melodic beauty and sonic diversity. Grant displays the nuanced soulfulness in her voice, and touches on folk, R&B, and rock balladry. It was produced, engineered and mixed by Daniel Ledwell.

Grants seventh album, Love, Inevitable, was released on May 31, 2019. She began writing songs for the record in 2018. After making four consecutive albums with her husband, Daniel Ledwell, garnering a cult following and critical acclaim, Grant stepped out of her usual comfort zone and reached out to Grammy nominated American producer and engineer, Tucker Martine. Grant wrote the tracks in her living room in Halifax using a Roland keyboard, acoustic guitar and banjo. She then flew to Portland, Oregon in July 2018 to record at Martine's Flora Recording and Playback.

Her 2023 album, Champagne Problems, consists entirely of songs Grant recorded in collaboration with other Canadian singer-songwriters, including Aquakultre, Bahamas, Dan Mangan, Kevin Drew, Basia Bulat, Joel Plaskett, Ria Mae, Josh Qaumariaq, Hannah Georgas, Amy Millan, and Tim Baker.

In 2025, she contributed a cover of Joel Plaskett's "Lying on a Beach" to the Plaskett tribute album Songs from the Gang.

== Personal life ==
Born in Charlottetown, Prince Edward Island to Dr. Ken Grant (a vascular surgeon) and Heather Elizabeth Grant (née MacDonald), she moved to Halifax at the age of ten with her mother and brother, Daniel Grant, when her parents' marriage broke up. She attended Saint Mary's University for a time and later graduated from the Nova Scotia College of Art and Design University, with a Bachelor of Fine Arts in painting. Her grandfather was the federal cabinet minister Daniel J. MacDonald.

Grant's mother, who was an inspiration to her career, was named the Queen of Azaleas in 1973 in Norfolk, Virginia. Grant's video for the song "The Fighter" uses 16mm film footage of this parade and time, as this song and album are a dedication to her mother's life; she died in May 2012.

Grant married producer and musician Daniel Ledwell in October 2011. On December 11, 2018, after several rounds of in-vitro fertilisation treatment, Jenn and Daniel welcomed their baby Gus into the world.

Grant enjoys painting, including designing some of her own album covers.

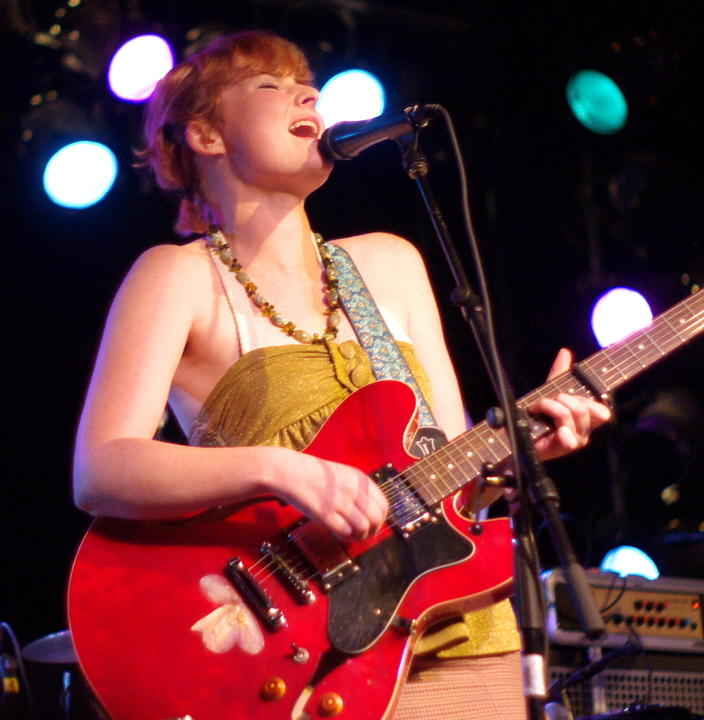
Jenn Grant performing at the New Capital Music Hall in Ottawa, Ontario, 2007

== Awards ==
In 2006, Grant won Best New Artist and Best Female Artist at the Nova Scotia Music Awards.

Honeymoon Punch was a longlisted nominee for the 2011 Polaris Music Prize, and was shortlisted for a Juno Award in the Adult Alternative Album of the Year category at the Juno Awards of 2012.

Grant won an East Coast Music Award for the song of the year at the 2013 ECMAs of the album "The Beautiful Wild". Grant won an East Coast Music Award for Pop Recording of the Year at the 2012 ECMAs for The Beautiful Wild. At the 2013 ECMAs, she won the award for Song of the Year, for that album's single "I've Got Your Fire".

Grant's song "Dreamer", from Orchestra for the Moon, is featured as the theme song on CBC's Heartland. Her song "Make it Home Tonight" was played at the end of episode 12 of Flashpoint, "Haunting the Barn".

Her album Compostela has been nominated for two Juno Awards.

In 2024, Jenn was named Songwriter of the Year at the East Coast Music Awards.

== Discography ==
- 2005 – Jenn Grant and Goodbye Twentieth Century (EP)
- 2007 – Orchestra for the Moon
- 2009 – Echoes
- 2010 – Songs for Siigoun (EP)
- 2011 – Honeymoon Punch
- 2012 – The Beautiful Wild
- 2014 – Clairvoyant (EP)
- 2014 – Compostela
- 2017 – Paradise
- 2019 – Love, Inevitable
- 2020 – Forever on Christmas Eve
- 2023 – Champagne Problems
- 2026 — Queen of the Strait
