= Miranda Mulholland =

Canadian fiddle player and singer

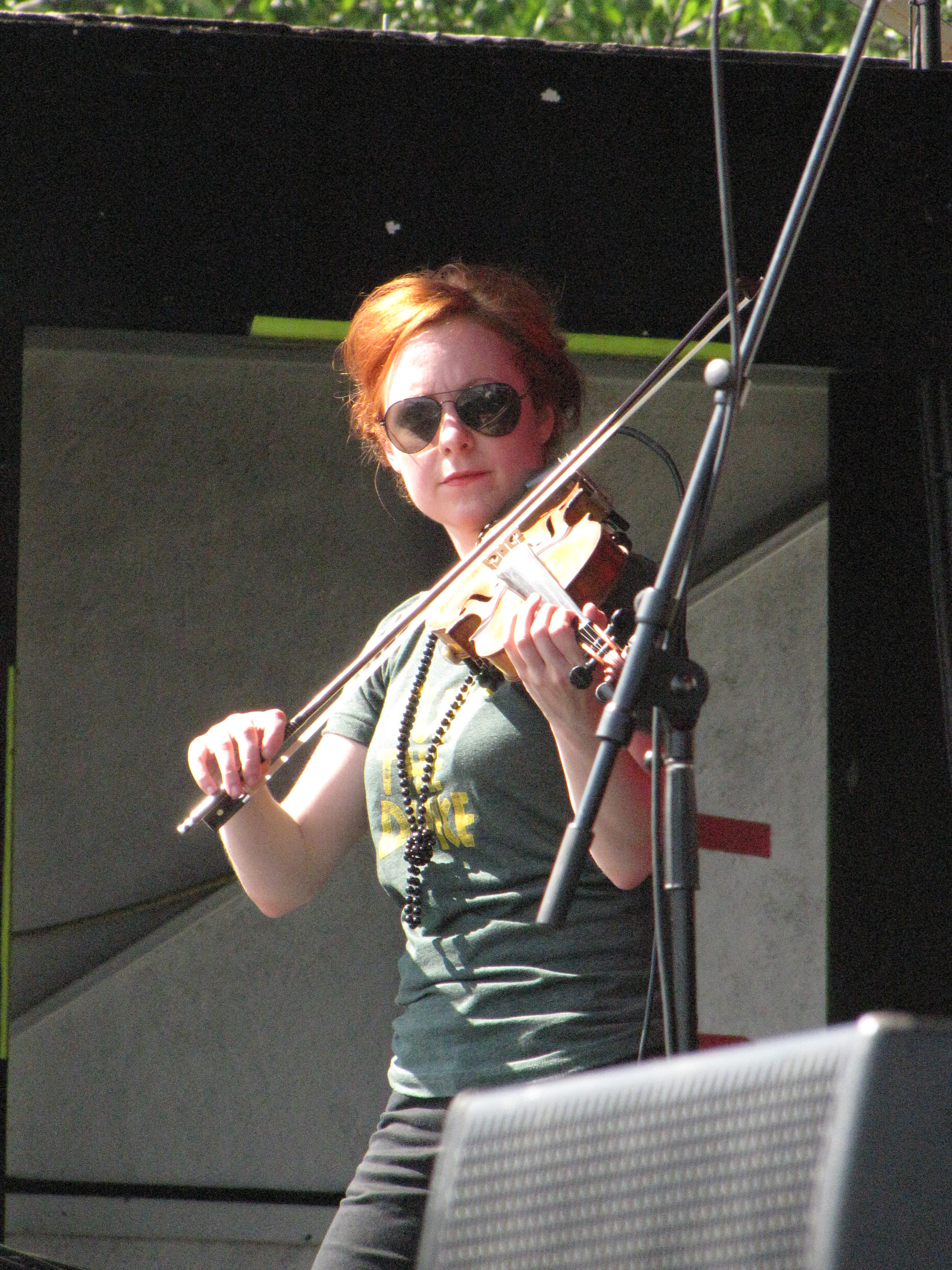
- Mulholland, performing as part of Great Lake Swimmers at the Burlington Sound of Music festival June 2010

Background information
- Born: September 14; Guelph, Ontario, Canada
- Occupation(s): Fiddle player, singer
- Instrument: Fiddle
- Labels: Roaring Girl
- Website: MirandaMulholland.ca

Miranda Mulholland is a Canadian fiddle player and singer.

== Biography ==
Mulholland is a member of Great Lake Swimmers, Belle Starr, and The Rattlesnake Choir as well as the founder and lead singer for the Roaring Girl Cabaret. She makes select appearances in the violin show Bowfire, and has played fiddle with Jim Cuddy, John Borra and Justin Rutledge, among others. Not limited to band performances, Mulholland has appeared in various theatre productions including Parfumerie and the world premiere of Spoon River with Soulpepper Theatre in Toronto.

In addition to varied studio work, she has toured extensively in Europe and North America with the Celtic rock bands The Mahones, The Peelers, The Paperboys, The Glengarry Bhoys and the alt-country band Luther Wright and the Wrongs. She was a member of the Canadian cast of Barrage and was the vocal and fiddle soloist for the Irish dance show Spirit of Ireland and Celtic Blaze.

Mulholland can be heard on records by Justin Rutledge, Sarah Slean, NQ Arbuckle and Kevin Quain, and her debut album for The Roaring Girl Cabaret is titled In Last Night's Party Clothes. She was born in Guelph, Ontario and was a violin student of the Guelph Suzuki School, and studied opera performance at the University of Western Ontario and McGill University.

On May 13, 2014, Mulholland released her debut solo album Whipping Boy produced by multi-instrumentalist Sean Watkins (Nickel Creek) on her own boutique label Roaring Girl Records. Roaring Girl Records is distributed by Fontana North. In addition, Mulholland founded Sawdust City Music Festival in Gravenhurst, Ontario, and is on the Board of Governors of Massey Hall and Roy Thompson Hall.

In 2017, Mulholland formed a duo, Harrow Fair, with guitarist Andrew Penner.

== Discography ==
- Bob Egan, Alejandro Escovedo Benefit CD (2004) - fiddle/vocals
- The Glengarry Bhoys, Mill Sessions (2006) - fiddle/vocals
- The Mahones, Take No Prisoners (2006) - fiddle
- The Skye Consort, Courting Stories (2008) - vocals
- Justin Rutledge, Man Descending (2008) - violin
- NQ Arbuckle, XOK (2008) - fiddle
- Kevin Quain, Winter in Babylon (2008) - fiddle
- Sarah Slean, The Baroness (2008) - vocals
- Luther Wright, Man of Your Dreams (2008) - fiddle
- Rattlesnake Choir, Live Music (2008) - fiddle/vocals
- The Roaring Girl Cabaret, In Last Night's Party Clothes (2008) - composer, vocals, violin
- Enter the Haggis, Gutter Anthems (2009) - vocals
- Celtic Blaze, Cast Album (2009) - fiddle/vocals
- Carolyn Mark and NQ Arbuckle, Let's Just Stay Here (2009) - fiddle
- The Rattlesnake Choir, Walkin' the Wire(2011) - fiddle/vocals
- Great Lake Swimmers, New Wild Everywhere (2012) - fiddle/vocals
- Amos the Transparent, Goodnight My Dear...I'm Falling Apart - fiddle/vocals
- Belle Starr, Belle Starr (2012) - fiddle/vocals
- Miranda Mulholland, Whipping Boy (2014) - vocals/fiddle
