= Five Hole: Tales of Hockey Erotica =

2009 Canadian short film

- Directed by: Cam Christiansen
- Written by: Dave Bidini
- Produced by: Cam Christiansen
- Cinematography: Cam Christiansen
- Edited by: Cam Christiansen
- Music by: Dave Bidini; Selina Martin
- Animation by: Cam Christiansen
- Production company: Anlanda
- Distributed by: Bravo!FACT
- Release date: October 4, 2009 (CIFF)
- Running time: 5 minutes
- Country: Canada
- Language: English

Five Hole: Tales of Hockey Erotica is a Canadian animated short film, directed by Cam Christiansen and released in 2009. Based on Dave Bidini's book The Five Hole Stories, the film blends motion capture and video mapping animation to tell a story about sex in the world of ice hockey.

The film was originally envisioned by Christiansen as an animated feature that would dramatize all of the stories in Bidini's original book; however, after failing to secure sufficient funding to make a feature, he proceeded to make the short film version. The film is set to a song written by Bidini and Selina Martin, and performed by Bidini, Martin, Barry Mirochnick, Ford Pier and Martin Tielli.

The film premiered at the 2009 Calgary International Film Festival.

The film was named to the Toronto International Film Festival's annual year-end Canada's Top Ten list for 2009.
