= Reintegration Time =

Studio album by Shout Out Out Out Out
- Released: March 3, 2009 (CAN)
- Recorded: 2008
- Genres: Electro, alternative dance, dance-punk
- Label: Nrmls Wlcm Records
- Producer: Nik Kozub

Shout Out Out Out Out chronology
Not Saying/Just Saying (2006)	Reintegration Time (2009)

Professional ratings
Review scores
Source	Rating
AllMusic	3/5 stars
Slant Magazine	3/5 stars
Spin	3/5 stars

Reintegration Time is the second album from Canadian alternative dance band Shout Out Out Out Out, released in Canada on March 3, 2009 and in the United States on May 5, 2009, on Nrmls Wlcm Records.

The album's first single, "In the End It's Your Friends" was released in 2008 on a 12" single split with American electronic artist San Serac.

Tracks from Reintegration Time were featured in the video game Mass Effect 3, as background music in Commander Shepard's personal cabin.

The album's sound was compared to that of 1980s acts like OMD.

== Track listing ==
1. "Run"
2. "Guilt Trips Sink Ships"
3. "Bad Choices"
4. "Coming Home" (feat. Cadence Weapon)
5. "How Do I Maintain Pt. 1"
6. "How Do I Maintain Pt. 2"
7. "One Plus Two Plus Three"
8. "Remind Me in Dark Times"
9. "In the End It's Your Friends"
10. "Reintegration Time"
