= Fokestar =

2006 EP by Luke Doucet

Fokestar (EP)

EP by Luke Doucet
- Released: 2006
- Genre: Indie rock, country
- Label: Six Shooter
- Producer: Luke Doucet

Luke Doucet chronology
Broken (And Other Rogue States) (2005)	Fokestar (EP) (2006)	Blood’s Too Rich (2008)

Fokestar is the first EP by Canadian singer-songwriter Luke Doucet. The EP was released digitally in 2006 in Canada. It contains five songs, two of which, "Long Haul Driver" and "Bombs Away", are early versions of songs which would be rerecorded for Doucet's next album, Blood's Too Rich.

== Track listing ==
1. "From Here to Nowhere" – 4:45
2. "Saints Local 5" – 3:56
3. "Long Haul Driver" – 3:34
4. "Bombs Away" – 3:50
5. "A Beautiful Day to Be Alive" – 2:51
