= The Fate of the World Depends on This Kiss =

Studio album by Whitehorse
- Released: 2012
- Recorded: moon:and:6 with Nik Kozub
- Genre: Indie rock, Country
- Length: 46:48
- Label: Six Shooter Records
- Producer: Luke Doucet with Nik Kozub

Whitehorse chronology
Whitehorse (2011)	The Fate of the World Depends on This Kiss (2012)	The Road to Massey Hall (2013)

Professional ratings
Review scores
Source	Rating
The Grid	7/10 stars
Now	4/5 stars

The Fate of the World Depends on This Kiss is the second album from Whitehorse, a band consisting of Melissa McClelland and Luke Doucet. The album was released on August 28, 2012 in Canada by Six Shooter Records.

The album was shortlisted for the 2013 Polaris Music Prize on June 13, 2013.

== Personnel ==
- Luke Doucet: vocals, all instruments except the following
- Melissa McClelland: vocals, piano on "Cold July" and "Mexico Texico", additional percussion on "Jane"
- Andrew Scott: drums on "Cold July", bass on "Cold July", and B3 organ on "Cold July"
- Barry Mirochnick: drums on "Radiator Blues", "Out Like a Lion", and "Annie Lu", B3 bass pedals on "Annie Lu"
- Jason Tait: drums on "Achilles' Desire", "Wisconsin" and "Mexico Texico", percussion on "Wisconsin"
- Paul Brennan: drums on "Devil's Got a Gun" and "No Glamour in the Hammer", percussion on "Devil's Got a Gun"
- Pat Steward: drums on "Out Like a Lion" and "Peterbilt Coalmine"
- Doug Elliott: bass on "Out Like a Lion" and "Peterbilt Coalmine"
- Chloe Doucet-Winkelman: piano on "Out Like a Lion", and additional vocals on "Out Like a Lion"
- Leon Furs: piano on "Radiator Blues" and "Devil's Got a Gun", and guitar on "No Glamour in the Hammer"
- Nik Kozub: programming beats, et cetera on "Jane"
- Roman Marcone: Mixing

== Track listing ==
1. "Achilles' Desire"
2. "Devil's Got a Gun"
3. "Mismatched Eyes (Boat Song)"
4. "Peterbilt Coalmine"
5. "Cold July"
6. "Jane"
7. "Out Like a Lion"
8. "No Glamour in the Hammer"
9. "Radiator Blues"
10. "Annie Lu"
11. "Wisconsin"
12. "Mexico Texaco"
- All songs written by Luke Doucet & Melissa McClellend, except Jane was written by Luke Doucet, Melissa McClellend & Shout Out Out Out Out
