= Blood's Too Rich =

Studio album by Luke Doucet & the White Falcon
- Released: January 8, 2008
- Genres: Indie rock, country
- Label: Six Shooter
- Producer: Luke Doucet

Luke Doucet chronology
Fokestar (2006)	Blood's Too Rich (2008)	Steel City Trawler (2010)

Professional ratings
Review scores
Source	Rating
Allmusic	3/5 stars
Now Magazine	3/5 stars

Blood's Too Rich by Luke Doucet & the White Falcon is Luke Doucet's third studio album. The album was released in Canada on January 8, 2008 by Six Shooter Records. Six Shooter Records released the album in the United States on June 24, 2008.

In an interview for Exclaim!, Doucet commented on how the album compared with his previous album, Broken:

Broken was very much single-themed. It was a break-up record about broken hearts and wallowing in pity and self-despair. In comparison, this record is looser, thanks to the help of the band the White Falcon. Although they worked on the last record, this is three-and-a-half years later, where they've actually become a band, rather than it being just me and the people I hire. I hope that comes across, because that's deliberate. It was deliberate to treat the process as one involving my band and friends as opposed to my employees.

The White Falcon is Rich Levesque, bass, John Dinsmore, six-string bass, Paul Brennan, drums and Doucet's wife Melissa McClelland, backing vocals. The name, "The White Falcon" refers to Doucet's reissue Gretsch White Falcon Guitar.

In promotion of "Blood's Too Rich", Doucet toured across Canada and the United States with Blue Rodeo, toured Europe with Oh Susanna and will tour Europe again this fall, followed by a Canadian tour supporting James Blunt.

== Track listing ==
All songs written by Doucet except as indicated.

1. "Long Haul Driver"
2. "Blood's Too Rich"
3. "The Lovecats" (Robert Smith)
4. "Cleveland"
5. "First Day (In the New Hometown)"
6. "Take You Home"
7. "The Comandante"
8. "Beacon on the Southpaw"
9. "Motorbike" (Luke Doucet/Mike Plume)
10. "It's Only Tuesday"
11. "The Day Rick Danko Died"
12. "Bombs Away"
