= Rule 62 =

Studio album by Whitney Rose
- Released: October 6, 2017
- Studio: Blackbird Studios, Nashville, Tennessee, USA
- Length: 43:25
- Label: Six Shooter
- Producer: Raul Malo

Whitney Rose chronology
Heartbreaker of the Year (2015)	Rule 62 (2017)	South Texas Suite (2017)

Professional ratings
Aggregate scores
Source	Rating
Metacritic	73/100
Review scores
Source	Rating
AllMusic	4/5 stars
American Songwriter	4/5 stars
The Austin Chronicle	2/5 stars

Rule 62 is the third studio album by Canadian-born American musician Whitney Rose. It was released on October 6, 2017, through Six Shooter Records.

== Track listing ==
No.	Title	Length
1.	"I Don't Want Half (I Just Want Out)"	3:05
2.	"Arizona"	3:57
3.	"Better to My Baby"	3:11
4.	"You Never Cross My Mind"	4:00
5.	"You Don't Scare Me"	4:09
6.	"Can't Stop Shakin'"	4:20
7.	"Tied to the Wheel"	4:39
8.	"Trucker's Funeral"	4:55
9.	"Wake Me in Wyoming"	3:26
10.	"You're a Mess"	3:45
11.	"Time to Cry"	3:58
