= Ford Pier =

Canadian singer-songwriter

- Born: 1970 (age 55–56); Boston, Massachusetts, United States
- Genre: Indie rock
- Occupations: Musician, songwriter
- Instruments: Vocals, guitar, keyboard
- Labels: Six Shooter, Zunior, Saved By Vinyl, Sudden Death
- Website: thefordpier.com

Ford Pier (born 1970) is a Canadian singer-songwriter. He was born in Boston, Massachusetts. His father is a professor of music. In addition to his solo albums, he has been a member of Jr. Gone Wild, Showbusiness Giants, Rheostatics and D.O.A. as well as Roots Roundup. He has appeared as a guest musician on albums by Carolyn Mark, Martin Tielli, Veda Hille, Tom Holliston, John Mann and Neko Case, and written orchestral and chamber arrangements for New Pornographers, Christine Fellows, Cris Derksen, King of Foxes, and The Queer Songbook Orchestra.

Currently a member of Dead Bob. Formed out of No Means No.

== Personal life ==
He resides in Vancouver.

== Discography ==
- Meconium (1995)
- 12-Step Plan, 11-Step Pier (1999)
- Besides (2000)
- Pier-ic Victory (2004)
- Organ Farming (2007)
- Adventurism (2009)
- Huzzah! (2012)
- Expensive Tissue (2018)
- Gormful In Maya (2020)
- The Twelfth Letter (2021)
