= The Embattled Hearts =

Studio album by Veal
- Released: June 2003
- Recorded: February 2002
- Studio: Greenhouse Studios, Vancouver
- Genre: Pop rock
- Length: 42:36
- Label: Six Shooter Records

Veal chronology
| Tilt O'Whirl (1999) | The Embattled Hearts (2003) |

The Embattled Hearts is Canadian band Veal's third album. The album was released in 2003. It was the reintroduction of lead singer Luke Doucet into the band since his comparatively more successful solo career. The album also marked the first with their new bassist, Nik Kozub, who had more of a punk-rock background.

The recording was made in February 2002, but label negotiations delayed the album release until June 2003.

The Edmonton Journal described the album's sound as "rockier" compared to the band's "proggier" two previous albums.

== Reception ==
The album was welcomed by Sean Carruthers of AllMusic, who described the sounds of the album as "Turning it into a rocking, sludgy rockabilly number". He feels the reintroduction of Luke has had a significant impact on the ambiance and style of music in the album.

== Track listing ==
1. "Defiler"
2. "Everybody Wants More Cocaine"
3. "Girlfriend (Parts II & III)"
4. "Radio"
5. "Judy Garland"
6. "Mitzi's"
7. "I Hate Your Lipstick"
8. "Circles"
9. "Toothbrush"
10. "Miss Brazil"
11. "Cowboy"
12. "Fader Creep"
