= The Ghost of Danny Gross =

Studio album by Martin Tielli
- Released: 2009
- Genre: folk rock
- Label: Six Shooter Records
- Producer: Martin Tielli and Selina Martin

Martin Tielli chronology
Operation Infinite Joy (2003)	The Ghost of Danny Gross (2009)

The Ghost Of Danny Gross is the third solo album by Martin Tielli, released in 2009 on Six Shooter Records. It is the final album to be released in the 2003 Martin Tielli Subscription Series. Most of the tracks on disc one include compositions by Jonathan Goldsmith from the film score for Lost Souls, a 1998 movie directed by Jeff Woolnough.

The album was released in two parts.

== Track listing ==
Disc One

1. Beautiful
2. The Underbrush
3. No price at all, on his head!
4. Ice
5. The house with the laughing windows
6. The dead children
7. Something in those woods (take 1)
8. I saw the sun last night
9. Storm
10. Jet
11. Flying
12. The Michigan Mumbler
13. We don't have any time
14. L'Astronaut

Disc Two

1. The Ghost of Danny Gross
2. Spider, Spider, Outsider
3. Sunshine Blue-Heart
4. Something in those woods (take 2)
5. The Drumming Partridge
6. The little man who was not there
7. Waterstriders (acoustic version)
8. Spring peepers
9. Wayfaring stranger
10. The Ghost of Danny Gross Reprise
11. The Seams of a Moment
