= The Road to Massey Hall =

EP by Whitehorse
- Released: February 15, 2013
- Genre: Indie rock, Country
- Label: Six Shooter Records

Whitehorse chronology
The Fate of the World Depends on This Kiss (2012)	The Road to Massey Hall (2013)	Éphémère sans repère (2014)

The Road to Massey Hall is an EP by Whitehorse, released February 15, 2013 on Six Shooter Records.

Inspired by the fact that the duo's most recent tour marked their first time performing at Massey Hall, one of Canada's most historically and culturally significant live music venues, the EP features five cover versions of songs by artists who had previously performed at the venue, as well as a traditional folk song.

== Track listing ==
1. "Winterlong" (Neil Young)
2. "Dark Angel" (Blue Rodeo)
3. "If You Could Read My Mind" (Gordon Lightfoot)
4. "It Ain't Me Babe" (Bob Dylan)
5. "Strawberry Blonde" (Ron Sexsmith)
6. "Un Canadien errant" (traditional)
