= Selina Martin (musician) =

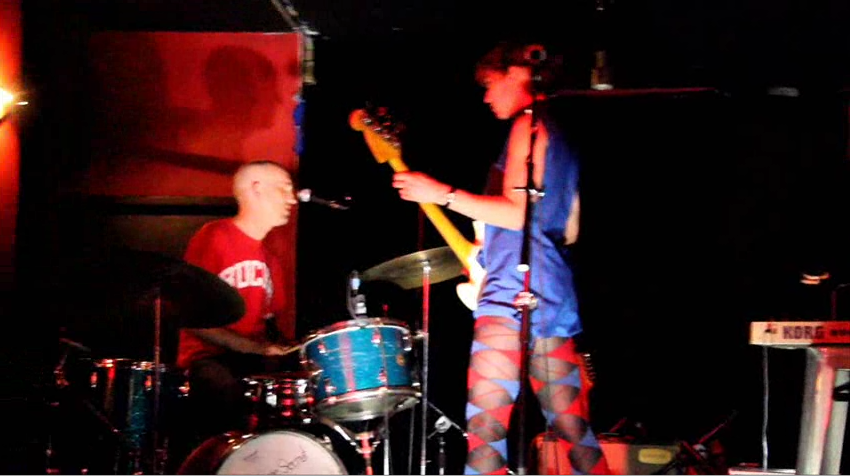
- Selina Martin at the Smiling Buddha Cabaret, Toronto, Ontario, Canada

Background information
- Origin: Toronto, Ontario, Canada
- Genres: Pop, Art Rock, experimental pop, Cabaret
- Years active: 1998–present
- Website: selinamartin.com

Selina Martin (born 1967) is a singer-songwriter from Toronto, Ontario, Canada, currently based in Nice, France. Her music is a fusion of pop, art-rock, and cabaret. It been described as “sneaky beautiful” and “sharp-as-shards.” She has been compared to PJ Harvey, Björk, and David Byrne.

== History ==
Martin is from Pakenham, Ontario, Canada. She moved to Toronto in the 1990s to study drama at the University of Toronto. After graduation, along with playwright Adam Nashman, poet Stan Rogal and actor Lisa Ryder, she formed Bald Ego Theatre, which produced plays in Toronto in the 1990s. She also began performing music during that time, joining Bob Wiseman’s band playing guitar, bass, accordion, theremin, wine glasses, and found objects, from 1995 to 1999. She also began performing and recording her own music, releasing her first record, Space Woman, in 1998, and touring across Canada and Europe.

Martin has released four additional albums: Life Drawing Without Instruction (2004), Disaster Fantasies (2010), i’ve been picking caruso’s brain; i think i have the information we need to make a new world (2016), and Time Spent Swimming (2022). She has also collaborated with Dave Bidini and Martin Tielli to write and record the music for the animated short film Five Hole: Tales of Hockey Erotica (2009). She is an occasional member of the experimental electronic music and visuals group The Faceless Forces of Bigness with Justin Stephenson, Chris Stringer, Kurt Swinghammer, and Michael-Phillip Wojewoda, and she has collaborated with the Rheostatics, Martin Tielli, Bidiniband, NQ Arbuckle, Veda Hille, Justin Rutledge, and Amelia Curran. She has also composed music for film, television, and theatre, including co-writing the score for the documentary Act of God with Bidini, Tielli, and Fred Frith. In recent years, she has toured extensively in Europe and in Canada with Tom Holliston of Nomeansno.

== Discography ==
=== Albums ===
- Space Woman (Festival Music Distribution, 1998)
- Life Drawing Without Instruction (Outside Music Distribution, 2005)
- Disaster Fantasies (Outside Music Distribution, 2010)
- I’ve Been Picking Caruso’s Brain; I Think I Have the Information We Need to Make a New World (2016)
- Time Spent Swimming (2022)

=== Singles ===
- The Hottest Day (2010)
- Wish List (2015)
- Hawaii (2016)
- Tangier (2022)
- If You Were A River (2022)
