= Whitney Rose =

Whitney Rose may refer to:

- Whitney Rose (musician) (born 1986), Canadian-American singer-songwriter
- Whitney Rose (TV personality) (born 1986), original cast member of The Real Housewives of Salt Lake City
