= Not Saying/Just Saying =

Studio album by Shout Out Out Out Out
- Released: July 26, 2006 (CAN)
- Recorded: 2006
- Genre: Electro, alternative dance, dance-punk
- Length: 46:07
- Label: Nrmls Wlcm Records
- Producer: Nik Kozub

Shout Out Out Out Out chronology
Not Saying/Just Saying (2006)	Reintegration Time (2009)

Professional ratings
Review scores
Source	Rating
Pitchfork Media	(5.7/10)
PopMatters	5/10 stars

Not Saying/Just Saying is the debut album from alternative dance band Shout Out Out Out Out. It was released in Canada on July 26, 2006 on Nrmls Wlcm Records.

The album's cover art was designed by Chad VanGaalen.

== Awards ==
The album was nominated for the Alternative Album of the Year at the 2007 Junos.

== Track listing ==
1. "Forever Indebted" – 5:40
2. "Self-Loathing Rulz" – 3:05
3. "Your Shitty Record Won't Mix Itself" – 5:14
4. "Inspiration > Competition" – 6:16
5. "Dude You Feel Electrical" – 6:15
6. "Procrastinator's Fight Song" – 4:39
7. "They Tear Down Houses Don't They?" – 6:06
8. "Chicken Soup for the Fuck You" – 4:14
9. "Do I Stutter?" – 4:38
