= Luke Doucet =

Canadian singer-songwriter (born 1973)

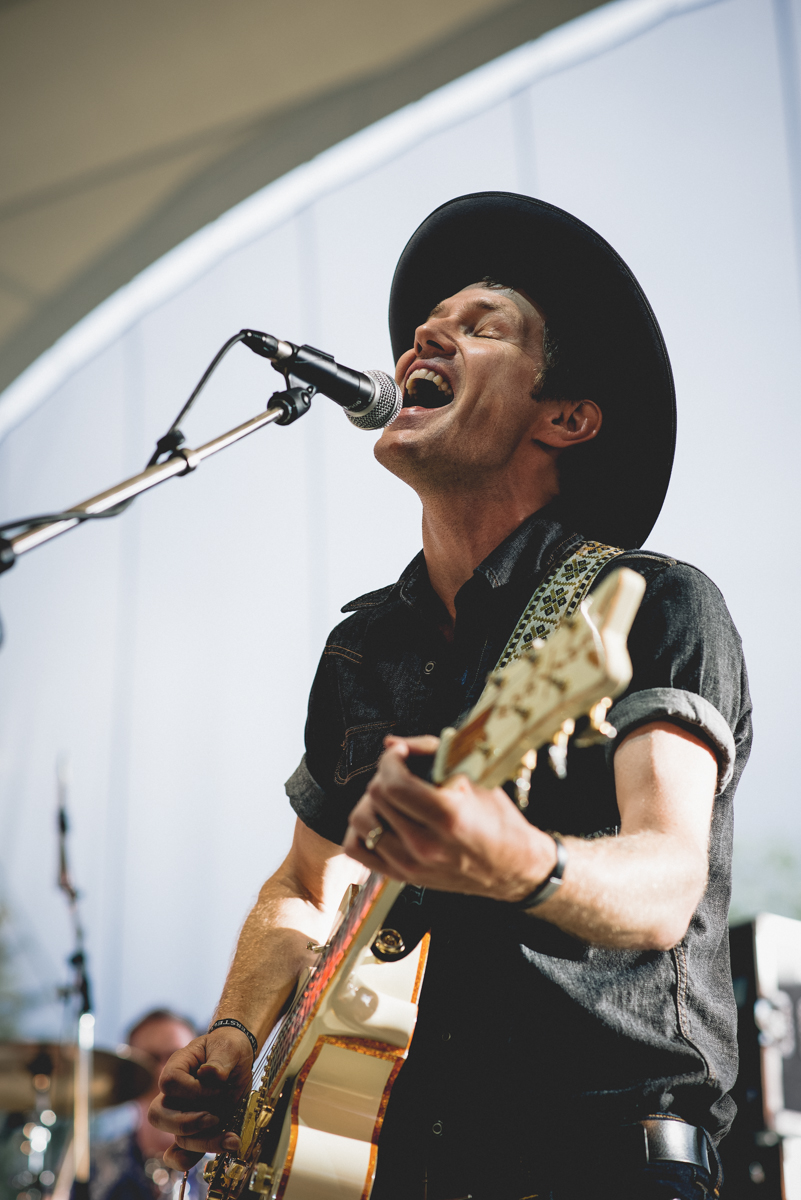
- Doucet performing in 2015.

Background information
- Born: June 9, 1973 (age 53); Halifax, Nova Scotia, Canada
- Origin: Vancouver, British Columbia, Canada
- Genres: Indie rock, folk rock, alternative country
- Occupations: Musician, songwriter, producer
- Instruments: Vocals, guitar, piano, drums
- Years active: 2001–present
- Label: Six Shooter
- Spouse: Melissa McClelland (m. 2006)
- Website: www.whitehorsemusic.ca

Luke Doucet (born June 9, 1973) is a Canadian singer-songwriter and guitarist. He has written and performed as a solo artist and as a member of the indie rock band Veal and the folk rock band Whitehorse.

In 2006 and 2011, Doucet was nominated for Juno Awards in the Adult Alternative Album of the Year category for his albums, Broken (And Other Rogue States) and Steel City Trawler.

== Early life ==
Doucet was born in Halifax, Nova Scotia, and raised in Manitoba. His parents divorced when he was young. When he was 11 years old, Doucet travelled solo from Winnipeg to Nova Scotia and at 13, he took a Greyhound bus from Winnipeg to Vancouver, British Columbia.

Doucet had planned to become a lawyer before deciding to focus on guitar. He got his first guitar later that same year, and played in a blues band with his dad when he was 15. He played in bands throughout high school.

== Career ==
Doucet joined the folk music group Acoustically Inclined shortly after the band from Winnipeg released its 1991 album Are You Inclined? He moved to Vancouver at 19 and joined Sarah McLachlan's band.

=== Veal ===
In 1994, Doucet became the front man for Vancouver rock band Veal. Along with Doucet, Veal consisted of bassist Nik Kozub and drummer Chang. Howard Redekopp and Barry Mirochnick had also played bass in the band. Veal released three albums, Hot Loser in 1996, Tilt O'Whirl in 1999 and The Embattled Hearts in 2003. In 1999, Doucet signed with music promoter Shauna de Cartier, who shortly after formed Six Shooter Records. The band is now defunct.

=== Solo career ===
In 2001, Doucet released his first album, Aloha, Manitoba. The album consists of songs written for Veal that his band-mates felt were "too soft".

A departure from his work with Veal, Aloha, Manitoba has a mellower, more folk-influenced sound. Bazil Donovan, Barry Mirochnick, Lloyd Peterson, Christine Fellows, Sky Onosson, and Gilles Fournier performed on the record. Aloha, Manitoba was the first official release for Toronto record label, Six Shooter Records, with a catalogue number of SIX01. Doucet is still with the label, and has released all of his solo albums with Six Shooter.

In 2004, Doucet released Outlaws: Live and Unreleased, a collection of mostly live songs and two unreleased studio recordings. Most of the album was recorded in February 2004 at the Rivoli in Toronto, Ontario.

In 2005, Doucet released his sophomore studio album, Broken (And Other Rogue States). A break-up album, Broken focused on the heartbreak of a failed relationship. Broken was nominated in 2006 for a Juno Award in the Adult Alternative Album of the Year category.

The Fokestar EP was released as a digital-only EP in 2006. It contains five songs, two of which ("Long Haul Driver" and "Bombs Away") are early versions of songs that would be re-recorded for Doucet's next album, Blood's Too Rich.

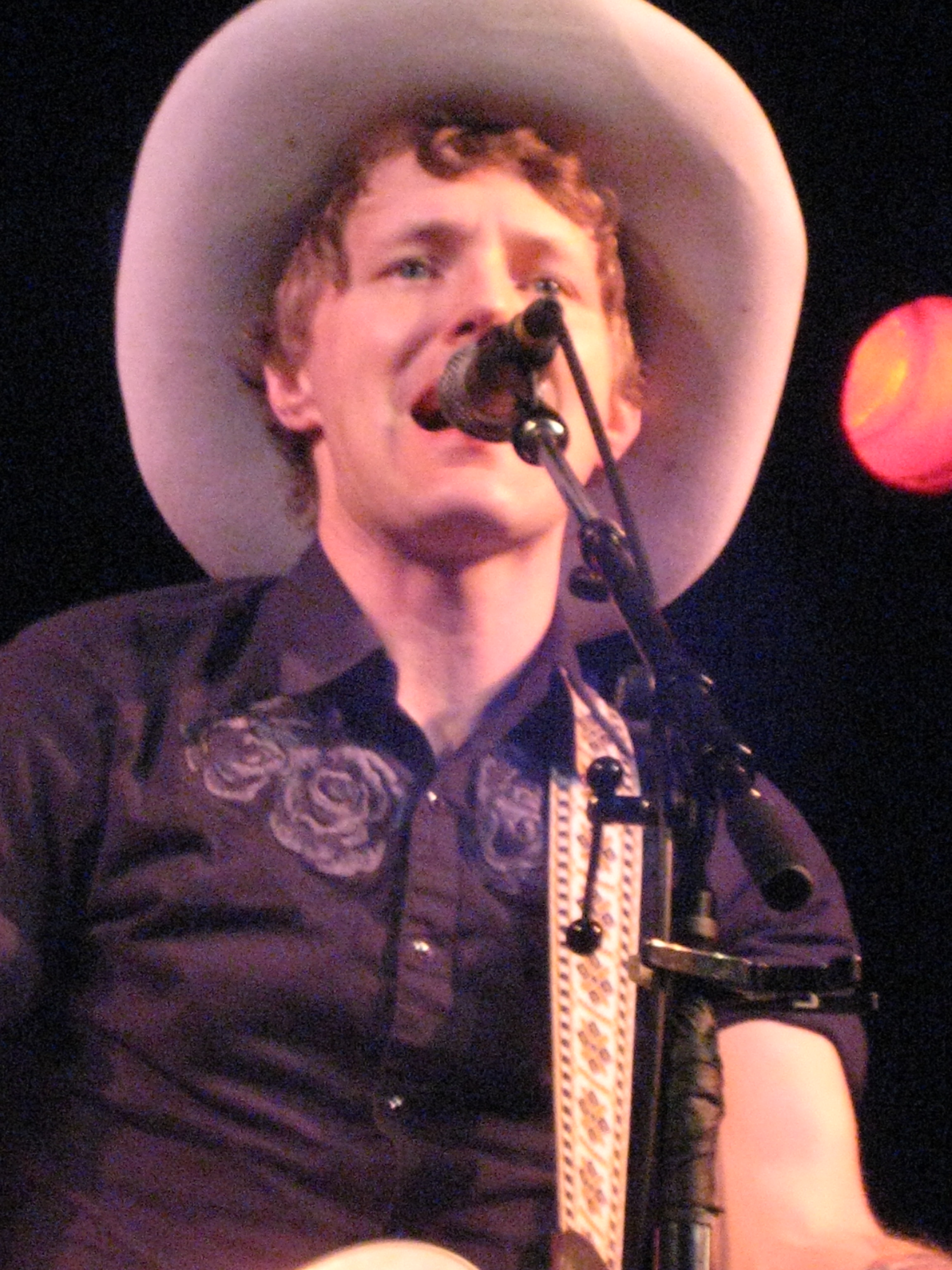
Doucet performing at the 2007 NXNE festival

In 2007, Doucet moved to Nashville where he wrote Blood's Too Rich. Despite being excited about living in such a musical city, Doucet was homesick and "longed to be back in Canada". Six Shooter released Blood's Too Rich on January 8, 2008, in Canada, and on June 24, 2008, in the United States.

While Doucet's earlier albums are simply billed as ‘by Luke Doucet', Blood's Too Rich is credited to both Luke Doucet and The White Falcon. Doucet wanted to express how important the band had been to his creative process. He worked with them so closely and for so long that they became much more than just hired musicians. The name The White Falcon refers to Doucet's reissue Gretsch White Falcon guitar.

In promotion of Blood's Too Rich, Doucet toured across Canada and the United States with Blue Rodeo, toured Europe twice with Oh Susanna and Melissa McClelland, and toured across Canada supporting James Blunt. In February 2009, Doucet headlined a Canadian tour with opener Amelia Curran.

Blood's Too Rich was listed on "best of 2008" lists, including a mention from the Independent (UK), and a spot on Nick Hornby's 2008 top 10 favourite songs (for Cleveland) in the New York Times.

Doucet also got the number one spot on a Toronto Star list of "unforgettable recordings, performances, and moments in 2008" and Blood's Too Rich won the 2008 Canadian Folk Music Award for "Contemporary Album of the Year".

In 2010, Doucet released his album Steel City Trawler, also credited to Luke Doucet and the White Falcon. The album was produced by Andrew Sloan. The album appeared on the !Earshot National Top 50 Chart. A small comic book by David Collier is included with the album.

=== Production work ===
Doucet has produced all of his solo records and has worked with several other artists as a producer. His production credits include Melissa McClelland's albums Stranded in Suburbia (2004), Thumbelina's One Night Stand (2006), and Victoria Day (2009); three albums by NQ Arbuckle, including Hanging the Battle-Scarred Pinata (2002), The Last Supper in a Cheap Town (2005), and XOK (2008); Hoserista (2000) by Captain Tractor; Rose Cousins' 2009 album The Send Off; and Tanya Coghlin's Astral Is Annie. Doucet also co-produced the first two albums by his band Veal, Hot Loser (1996) and Tilt O'Whirl (1999).

=== Session and touring work for other artists ===
Doucet has appeared as a guest musician on albums by Sarah McLachlan, Chantal Kreviazuk, Oh Susanna, Veda Hille, Melissa McClelland, Delerium, John Bottomley, Maren Ord, Captain Tractor, Mae Moore, Major Maker, and Lindy Vopnfjörd. Doucet recorded with Bryan Adams and Kathleen Edwards on a song produced by Colin Cripps in 2009 that had a limited release. He also toured the United States and Europe with Blue Rodeo in 2011, replacing Greg Keelor when he was ill. In 2026, Doucet filled in for Adams' guitarist Keith Scott while Scott recovered from surgery.

== Personal life ==
Luke Doucet married Melissa McClelland on June 24, 2006. The couple announced their marriage on the CBC program Sounds Like Canada on June 23. McClelland and Doucet have since put their respective solo careers on hold, and now record and perform as the musical duo Whitehorse.

Doucet has one daughter, Chloe, who is also a musician; she has performed with Doucet on albums and in live performances.

== Discography ==
=== Studio albums ===
- Aloha, Manitoba (Six Shooter Records, 2001)
- Broken (And Other Rogue States) (Six Shooter Records, 2005)
- Blood's Too Rich (Six Shooter Records, 2008)
- Steel City Trawler (Six Shooter Records, 2010)

=== Veal ===
- Hot Loser (Divine Industries, 1996)
- Tilt O'Whirl (Released on Square Dog Records, 1999 and re-released by Six Shooter Records, 2000)
- The Embattled Hearts (Six Shooter Records, 2003)

=== Whitehorse ===
- Whitehorse (Six Shooter Records, 2011)
- The Fate of the World Depends on This Kiss (Six Shooter Records, 2012)
- Leave No Bridge Unburned (Six Shooter Records, 2015)
- Panther in the Dollhouse (Six Shooter Records, 2017)
