= Outlaws (Luke Doucet album) =

Live album by Luke Doucet
- Released: 2004
- Recorded: February 10–11, 2004
- Venue: The Rivoli, Toronto, Ontario
- Genre: Indie rock, country
- Label: Six Shooter

Luke Doucet chronology
Aloha, Manitoba (2001)	Outlaws (2004)	Broken (And Other Rogue States) (2005)

Outlaws) is the second album by Luke Doucet, released in 2004 in Canada.

Outlaws is a collection of live songs and two unreleased studio recordings. Most of the album was recorded on February 10 and 11, 2004 at the Rivoli in Toronto.

== Track listing ==
1. "Emily, Please"
2. "Outlaws"
3. "Buttercloud"
4. "Pedro"
5. "Judy Garland"
6. "Gun St. Girl"
7. "Another Woman"
8. "Spiderman"
9. "Annie Lu"
10. "At the End of the Day"
