= Éphémère sans repère =

EP by Whitehorse
- Released: 2014
- Genre: Indie rock, Country
- Label: Six Shooter Records

Whitehorse chronology
The Road to Massey Hall (2013)	Éphémère sans repère (2014)	Leave No Bridge Unburned (2015)

Éphémère sans repère is the second EP by Canadian band Whitehorse. Released on April 1, 2014, the EP is the first album from the duo written in French, which contains four songs from previous albums, a new tune named "Le cadeau" and a rendition of "Un Canadien errant".

French lyric translations were provided by Pierre Marchand.

== Track listing ==
1. "Éphémère sans repère"
2. "Je suis devenue lionne"
3. "Les oiseaux de nuit"
4. "Le cadeau"
5. "Brisée"
6. "Un Canadien errant"
