= Let's Just Stay Here =

Studio album by Carolyn Mark and NQ Arbuckle
- Released: October 13, 2009
- Genre: alternative country
- Label: Mint Records

Carolyn Mark chronology
Nothing Is Free (2007)	Let's Just Stay Here (2009)	The Queen of Vancouver Island (2012)

NQ Arbuckle chronology
XOK (2008)	Let's Just Stay Here (2009)	The Future Happens Anyway (2014)

Let's Just Stay Here is an album by Canadian alternative country artists Carolyn Mark and NQ Arbuckle, released October 13, 2009 on Mint Records.

The album was a nominee for Roots & Traditional Album of the Year – Group at the 2010 Juno Awards.

== Personnel ==
The album features guest appearances by Corb Lund, Miranda Mulholland and Jenny Whiteley.

== Track listing ==
No.	Title	Writer(s)	Length
1.	"All Time Low"	Mark	4:01
2.	"Officer Down"	NQ Arbuckle	3:57
3.	"The 2nd Time"	Mark	4:35
4.	"Saskatoon Tonight"	NQ Arbuckle	4:27
5.	"Downtime"	Mike McDonald	3:01
6.	"Itchy Feet"	Mark	3:30
7.	"Passing Dream"	Tony Evans	3:26
8.	"Canada Day Off/Toronto"	Mark	4:33
9.	"Too Sober to Sleep"	Justin Rutledge	3:05
10.	"Sunday Morning"	Mark	3:06
11.	"When I Come Back"	NQ Arbuckle	3:50
12.	"Let's Just Stay Here"	Mark	4:22
