= Kevin Quain =

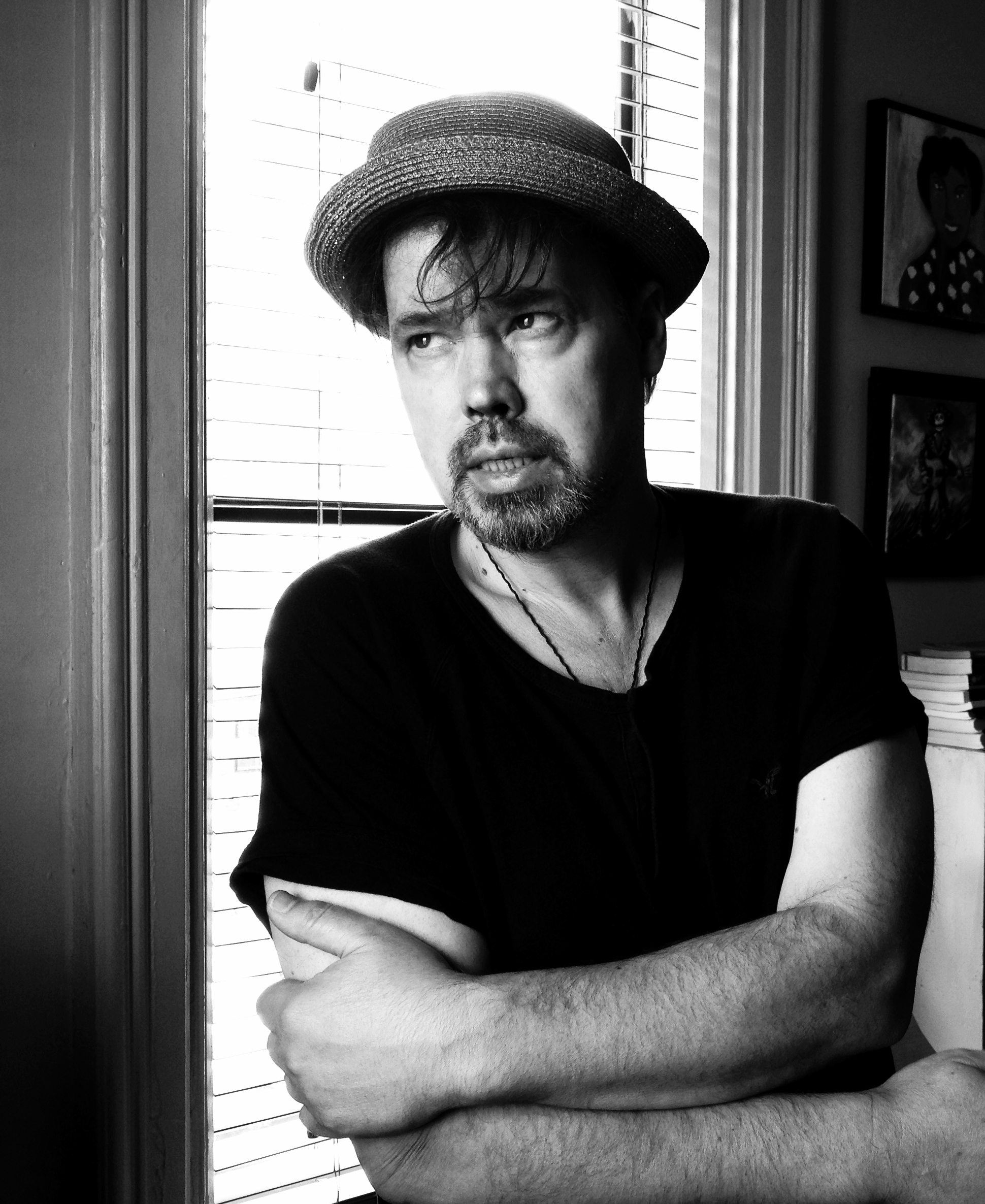

Background information
- Genres: Cabaret, jazz, rock n' roll
- Occupations: Singer-songwriter, musician, playwright, actor
- Instruments: Vocals, accordion, banjo, piano, guitar, bass, musical saw
- Years active: 1997–present
- Label: Independent
- Website: kevinquain.com

Kevin Quain is a cabaret artist, singer-songwriter playwright, composer and producer of audio recordings, who operates out of the Cameron House in Toronto, Canada.

Since 1995 he has performed long-running weekly residencies at various Toronto venues including The Cameron House, The Rex Hotel, and Graffiti's. He has produced recordings for other artists, in his small studio above Cameron House. He has worked with Michelle Rumball, Max Metrault, Frank & Max Evans, Sue & Dwight, and Carnival Diablo.

Quain edited The Elvis Reader: Texts and Sources on the King of Rock 'N' Roll.

He is a self-taught musician, singer/songwriter, and playwright. He has written music for film, TV, and the stage, and has performed with scores of artists including The Mahones, Carnival Diablo, and Mary Margaret O'Hara. He describes his unique music genre with The Mad Bastards as "garage jazz cabaret noir".

Quain created Tequila Vampire Matinee, a retelling of the opera Pagliacci, which opened in Toronto at Theatre Passe Muraille in November 2003 with Ted Dykstra directing. The show received six Dora Mavor Moore Award nominations in the General Theatre category. Kevin received the award for Outstanding New Musical.

== Discography ==
- Hangover Honeymoon (1999)
- Tequila Vampire Matinee (2000)
- Dog Show vol 1 (2006)
- Winter in Babylon (2008)
- Rain on the Midway (2011)
- Dream Weaver (2017)
- About November (2018)
