= Veal (band) =

Canadian rock band

- Origin: Vancouver, British Columbia, Canada
- Genres: Indie rock, country
- Years active: 1994
- Members: Luke Doucet; Chang; Nik Kozub
- Website: vealmusic.com

Veal is a Canadian indie rock band with country music influences. Originally based in Vancouver, the band later moved to Toronto, Ontario.

== History ==
Veal was formed in Vancouver in 1994. The band included guitarist Luke Doucet, and drummer Chang. Early bassists in Veal include Howard Redekopp and Barry Mirochnick. In 1996, the group released their first album, Hot Loser.

The band played a showcase at Canadian Music Week in Toronto in 1999. That year they released a second album, Tilt O'Whirl, which was recorded in Vancouver but mixed in Toronto. The band signed with music promoter Shauna de Cartier, who formed Six Shooter Records in order to release the band's work. The album was included in CBC RadioSonic's best of 1998 broadcast.

Bassist Nik Kozub, (now of Shout Out Out Out Out), later joined the band.

Doucet began a solo career in 2001 with the release of his album Aloha, Manitoba; he continued to perform and record with Veal. The band released a third album in 2003, The Embattled Hearts.

== Discography ==
- 1996 Hot Loser
- 1999 Tilt O'Whirl
- 2003 The Embattled Hearts
