= The Mahones =

Canadian Irish punk band

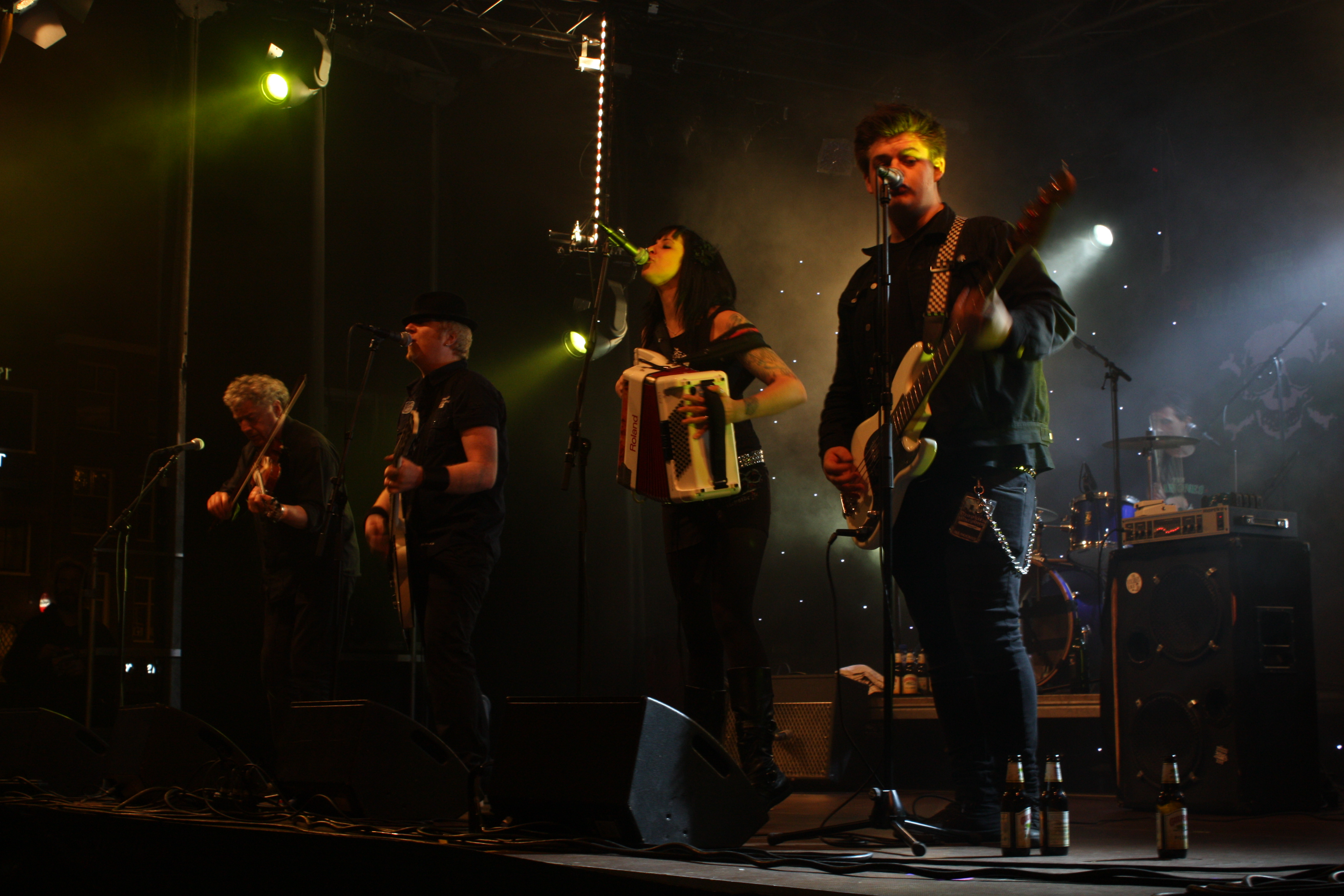
- The Mahones performing in 2010

Background information
- Origin: Kingston, Ontario, Canada
- Genres: Celtic punk
- Years active: 1990–present
- Label: Whiskey Devil Records
- Members: Finny McConnell; Guillaume Lauzon; Sean "Riot" Ryan; Michael O'Grady
- Past members: Joe Chithalen; Mauro Sepe; Owen Warnica; Andrew Brown; Dave Allen; Dom "The Bomb" Whelan; Ger O'Sullivan; Chris Scahill; Chris Smirnios; Miranda Mulholland; Ewen McIntosh; Paul "Cuzo" Mancuso; Eryk Chamberland; Jon Kane; Sean Winter; Mike Franey; Greg McConnell; Stephen McGrath
- Website: themahones.ie

The Mahones are a Canadian Irish punk band, formed on St. Patrick's Day in 1990, in Kingston, Ontario.

== Biography ==
The Mahones were formed in 1990 by Dublin-born Finny McConnell, as a one-off band for a St. Patrick's Day party. Encouraged by a positive reception, McConnell decided to pursue the band full-time. The Mahones have released thirteen albums to date with their most recent, Jameson Street, being released in 2022 being named the top celtic punk album of the year and have continually received high praise for their energetic live show ever since.

The Mahones' music has been featured in several major motion pictures. They co-wrote and recorded the title track for the 1996 film Celtic Pride with Dan Aykroyd. Their song "100 Bucks" was featured in the 1998 film Dog Park. Their song "Paint The Town Red" was featured in the climactic final fight scene of the 2010 Oscar Award-winning film The Fighter. Their song "A Little Bit of Love" is in the 2011 film Irvine Welsh's Ecstasy.

The Mahones have shared stages and toured with bands such as Dropkick Murphys, Stiff Little Fingers, Shane MacGowan and The Popes, Billy Bragg, Chuck Ragan, UK Subs, Sick of It All, The Defects, Agnostic Front, The Buzzcocks, D.O.A., Against Me, The Tragically Hip, Crash Vegas, The Damned, Suicidal Tendencies, The Prodigy, Gwar, Skunk Anansie, Blue Rodeo, Steve Earle, The Alarm, Sinéad O'Connor, Roger Miret and the Disasters, Dylan Walshe, Flogging Molly, Spirit of the west, The Dubliners, Christy Moore, The Band, and Van Morrison. The band's cited influences included The Clash, The Pogues, Greenland Whalefishers, The Who, and Hüsker Dü. The group's lineup has changed a number of times, with McConnell as the main constant member. Pogues members Terry Woods and Phil Chevron joined the band on tour in 2003.

In 1999, bassist Joe Chithalen died in Amsterdam shortly after a concert. He had accidentally ingested food containing peanuts, to which he was allergic. The Joe Chithalen Memorial Musical Instrument Lending Library, Joe's M.I.L.L., was established in Kingston soon after by Wally High. The Mahones perform fundraising concerts for Joe's M.I.L.L. annually.

In 2010, The Mahones started their own record label, Whiskey Devil Records, and signed a distribution deal with eOne Music.

In 2014, The Mahones were nominated Best Punk Band at the Sirius XM Indie Awards. In 2012, The Mahones' album The Black Irish won the Independent Music Award for Best Punk Album, and Angels & Devils won Paddy Rock Radio's album of the year, as well as Vandala Concepts' album of the year

In 2016, Scruffy Wallace joined as the band bagpipe player. Wallace was a member of Dropkick Murphys for 12 years.

Advertising for the band's 2023–2024 "The Last Call At The Bar" tour indicated that this would be the group's final tour.

== Name ==
The Mahones cite The Pogues as a main influence. That band were originally called Pogue Mahone (an anglicisation of an Irish phrase meaning "kiss my arse"), but later shortened it to The Pogues. "The Mahones" is seen as similarly derived from Pogue Mahone, as a tribute to The Pogues.

== Members ==
Current members

- Finny McConnell - lead vocals, guitar, mandolin, songwriter
- Guillaume Lauzon (The Brains, Ccomfortt)- drums
- Sean "R!ot" Ryan - bass, vocals
- Michael O'Grady - tin whistle, vocals

Former members

- Katie "Kaboom" McConnell - accordion, vocals
- Dom Whelan - drums
- Stephen McGrath
- Scruffy Wallace - bagpipes
- Chris Ward
- Colm McConnell
- Paul Mancuso
- "The" Barry Williams
- Andrew Brown
- Ger O'Sullivan
- Mauro Sepe
- Owen Warnica
- David Allen
- Kevan Williams
- Paddy Concannon
- Miranda Mulholland
- Chris Scahill
- Chris Smirnios
- Greg McConnell
- Ewen McIntosh
- Joe Chithalen
- Sean Winter
- Eryk Chamberland
- Mike Franey
- Jamie Oliver (Drummer)
- Arlyn Bradley (bass)
- Emmet VanEtten (drums)

== Discography ==
=== Studio albums ===
| Year | Album |
|---|---|
| 1994 | Draggin' the Days |
| 1996 | Rise Again |
| 1999 | The Hellfire Club Sessions |
| 2001 | Here Comes Lucky |
| 2006 | Take No Prisoners |
| 2010 | The Black Irish |
| 2012 | Angels & Devils |
| 2014 | The Hunger & The Fight (Pt. 1) |
| 2015 | The Hunger & The Fight (Pt. 2) |
| 2016 | 25 Years of Irish Punk (The Very Best) |
| 2019 | Love + Death + Redemption |
| 2020 | Unplugged |
| 2022 | Jameson Street |

=== Live albums ===
| Year | Album |
|---|---|
| 2003 | Live at the Horseshoe |
| 2014 | A Great Night on the Lash (Live in Italy) |

=== Compilations ===
| Year | Album |
|---|---|
| 2004 | Paint the Town Red |
| 2008 | Irish Punk Collection |
| 2010 | Whiskey Devils – A Tribute to the Mahones |
| 2019 | The Irish Songs |

=== Demo ===
| Year | Album |
|---|---|
| 1993 | Clear the Way |

=== Singles ===
| Year | Single | CAN AC | Album |
|---|---|---|---|
| 1996 | "100 Bucks" | 45 | Rise Again |
| 1997 | "Rise Again" | 52 | Rise Again |
| 1999 | "When It Comes Around" | | The Hellfire Club Sessions |
| 1999 | "This Old Town" | | The Hellfire Club Sessions |
| 2001 | "One Last Shot" | | Here Comes Lucky |
| 2006 | "A Little Bit of Love" (with Damhnait Doyle) | | Take No Prisoners |
| 2010 | "Give It All Ya Got" | | The Black Irish |
| 2011 | "A Great Night on the Lash" | | The Black Irish |
