= Operation Infinite Joy =

Studio album by Martin Tielli
- Released: 2003
- Genre: folk rock
- Label: Six Shooter Records
- Producer: Jonathan Goldsmith

Martin Tielli chronology
We Didn't Even Suspect That He Was the Poppy Salesman (2001)	Operation Infinite Joy (2003)	The Ghost of Danny Gross (2009)

Operation Infinite Joy is the second solo album by Martin Tielli of the band Rheostatics, released in 2003 on Six Shooter Records. This was the first album to be released as part of the 2003 Martin Tielli Subscription Series.

== Track listing ==
1. Beauty On
2. OK By Me
3. The Temperance Society Choir
4. Sgt. Kraulis
5. Andy by the Lake
6. Cold Blooded Old Times
7. Winnipeg
8. Water Striders
9. Ship of Fire
10. Kathleen
11. National Pride (2003 Martin Tielli Subscription Series version only)
12. Diamonds On Our Toes (2003 Martin Tielli Subscription Series version only)
