= We Didn't Even Suspect That He Was the Poppy Salesman =

Studio album by Martin Tielli
- Released: 2001
- Genre: folk rock
- Label: Six Shooter Records
- Producer: Michael Phillip Wojewoda

Martin Tielli chronology
We Didn't Even Suspect That He Was the Poppy Salesman (2001)	Operation Infinite Joy (2003)

We Didn't Even Suspect That He Was the Poppy Salesman is the debut solo album by Martin Tielli of the band Rheostatics, released in 2001 on Six Shooter Records.

== Track listing ==
1. I'll Never Tear You Apart
2. My Sweet Relief
3. Double X
4. Voices from the Wilderness
5. Farmer in the City (Remembering Pasolini)
6. World in a Wall
7. That's How They Do it in Warsaw
8. How Can You Sleep?
9. She Said, "We're on Our Way Down"
10. From the Reel
11. Wetbrain/Your War
