= Steel City Trawler =

Studio album by Luke Doucet
- Released: August 31, 2010
- Genre: Indie rock, country
- Label: Six Shooter
- Producer: Luke Doucet

Luke Doucet chronology
Blood's Too Rich (2008)	Steel City Trawler (2010)

Steel City Trawler is the fourth studio album by Canadian singer-songwriter Luke Doucet, released August 31, 2010 on Six Shooter Records. The album was named as a longlisted nominee for the 2011 Polaris Music Prize.

== Track listing ==
No.	Title	Length
1.	"Monkeys"
2.	"Thinking People"
3.	"Hey Now"
4.	"The Ballad of Ian Curtis"
5.	"You Gotta Get It"
6.	"Magpie"
7.	"Sundown"
8.	"Dirty Dirty Blonde"
9.	"Love and a Steady Hand"
10.	"Dusted"
11.	"Some of You Folks"
