= The Deep Dark Woods =

Canadian alt-country band formed 2005

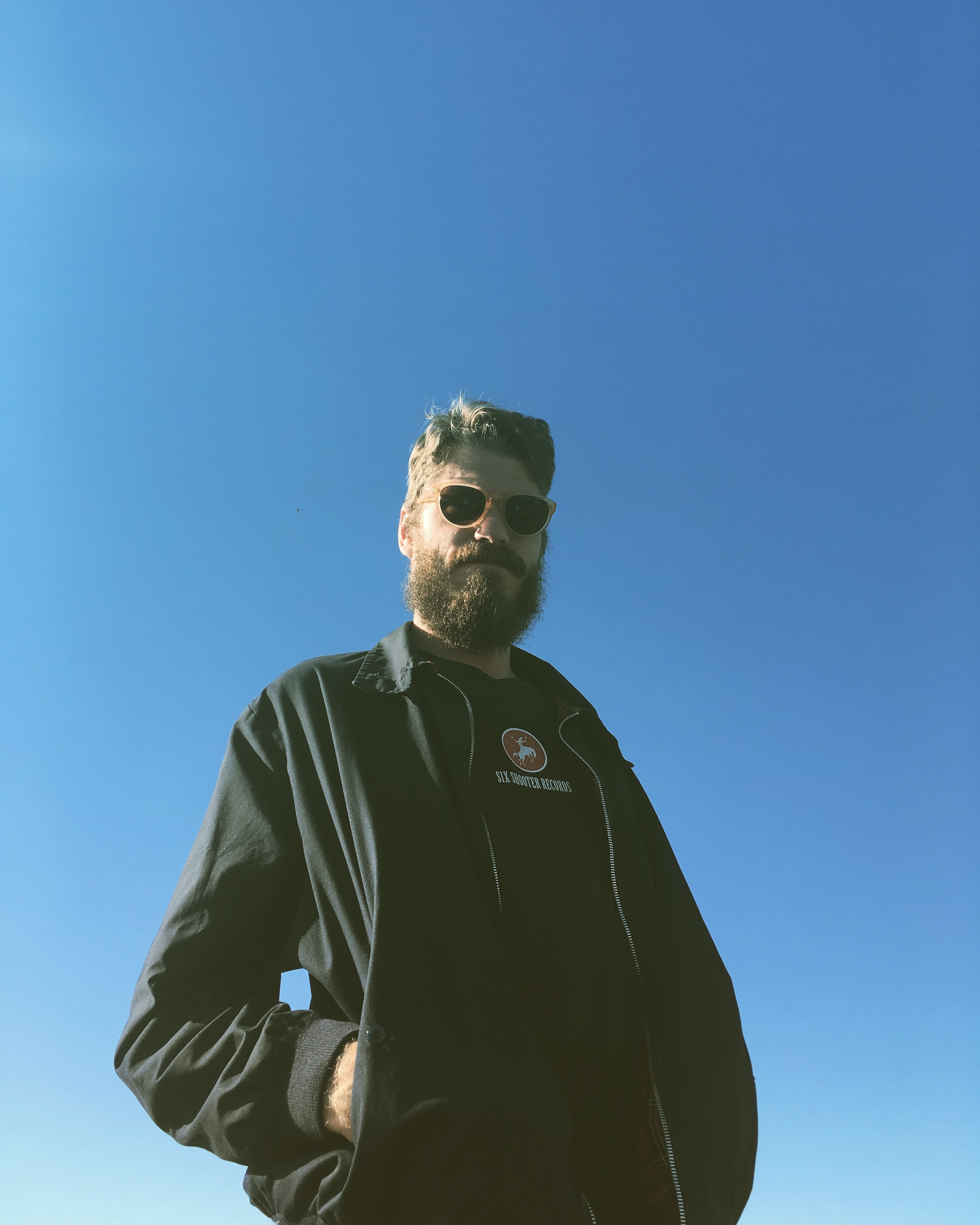
- Ryan Boldt of The Deep Dark Woods in October 2017

Background information
- Origin: Saskatoon, Saskatchewan, Canada
- Genres: Alternative country; folk; folk rock
- Years active: 2005-present
- Labels: Six Shooter; Sugar Hill; Black Hen Music; Victory Pool
- Members: Ryan Boldt; Geoff Hilhorst; Mike Silverman
- Past members: Burke Barlow; Chris Mason; Lucas Goetz; Clayton Linthicum; Evan Cheadle
- Website: www.thedeepdarkwoods.com

The Deep Dark Woods are a Canadian folk band from Saskatoon, currently signed to Sugar Hill Records in the United States and Six Shooter Records in Canada.

== History ==
First established in 2005, the band consisted of singer and guitarist Ryan Boldt, bass guitarist Chris Mason, guitarist Burke Barlow and drummer Lucas Goetz. Pianist and organist Geoff Hilhorst joined the group in 2009 after the release of their breakout album Winter Hours. Founding member Burke Barlow played guitar until 2012 when he left the group and was replaced by Clayton Linthicum. Founding Member Lucas Goetz left the group in late 2014, after which the band went on hiatus. In 2017 Chris Mason officially left the group.

They have released seven albums to date, and contributed an original song, "Charlie's (Is Coming Down)", to CBC Radio 2's Great Canadian Song Quest in 2009. Their fourth record, The Place I Left Behind, was released in Canada on Six Shooter Records in August 2011, and internationally on Sugar Hill Records on October 18, 2011. The band's fifth album, Jubilee was released on September 30, 2013 through Sugar Hill Records. The latest, Yarrow, was released on October 27, 2017 and was nominated for a Juno Award for Contemporary Roots Album of the Year category in 2019.

Boldt has also released one album, Broadside Ballads, as a solo artist independently of the band, in 2015. Two further albums, Broadside Ballads Volume II in 2020 and Broadside Ballads Volume III in 2024, were released as Deep Dark Woods albums.

In June 2025, the band announced a new album, The Circle Remains, which released on October 2, 2025.

== Discography ==
- The Deep Dark Woods (2006)
- Hang Me, Oh Hang Me (2007)
- Winter Hours (2009)
- The Place I Left Behind (2011)
- Jubilee (2013)
- Broadside Ballads (2015, Ryan Boldt solo album)
- Yarrow (2017)
- Love Is Pleasing + The Tide Was Flowing b/w Lone Pilgrim (single) (2018)
- Broadside Ballads Vol. II (2020)
- Changing Faces (2021)
- Broadside Ballads Vol. III (2024)
- The Circle Remains (2025)

== Awards and nominations ==
The Deep Dark Woods awards and nominations
Awards and nominations
Award	Wins	Nominations
Americana Music Awards	0	1
Canadian Folk Music Awards	2	2
Juno Awards	0	3
Western Canadian Music Awards	2	3

Totals (Note: Certain award groups do not simply award one winner. They acknowledge several different recipients, have runners-up, and have third place. Since this is a specific recognition and is different from losing an award, runner-up mentions are considered wins in this award tally. For simplification and to avoid errors, each award in this list has been presumed to have had a prior nomination.)
- Wins: 4
- Nominations: 8

Year	Nominated work	Event	Award	Result	Ref.
2008	Deep Dark Woods / Hang Me, Oh Hang Me	Western Canadian Music Awards	Roots Duo/Group Recording of the Year	Nominated	
2009	Deep Dark Woods / Winter Hours	Canadian Folk Music Awards	Ensemble of the Year	Won	
2009	Deep Dark Woods / Winter Hours	Western Canadian Music Awards	Roots Duo/Group Recording of the Year	Won	
2012	Deep Dark Woods	Americana Music Awards	Emerging Artist of the Year	Nominated	
2012	The Place I Left Behind	Juno Awards	Roots & Traditional Album of the Year - Group	Nominated	
2012	The Place I Left Behind	Western Canadian Music Awards	Roots Duo/Group Recording of the Year	Won	
2012	The Place I Left Behind	Canadian Folk Music Awards	Contemporary Album of the Year	Won	
2014	Jubilee	Western Canadian Music Awards	Roots Duo/Group Recording of the Year	Nominated	
2015	Jubilee	Juno Awards	Roots & Traditional Album of the Year - Group	Nominated	
2018	Deep Dark Woods	Western Canadian Music Awards	Roots Duo/Group of the Year	Nominated	
2019	Yarrow	Juno Awards	Contemporary Roots Album of the Year	Nominated	
