= Panther in the Dollhouse =

Studio album by Whitehorse
- Released: July 7, 2017
- Label: Six Shooter Records
- Producer: Gus van Go, Werner F

Whitehorse chronology
Leave No Bridge Unburned (2015)	Panther in the Dollhouse (2017)

Panther in the Dollhouse is the fourth studio album by Canadian rock band Whitehorse. The album was released via Six Shooter Records on July 7, 2017.

== Writing and production ==
Whitehorse is a Canadian band consisting of husband-and-wife musicians and songwriters Luke Doucet and Melissa McClelland. For Panther in the Dollhouse, they followed their usual writing pattern: each of them wrote songs individually. In an interview with Vue Weekly, McClelland says "We will each have a batch of songs and the ones we both gravitate to we claim are Whitehorse songs".

The track "Nighthawks" was written in response to Canada's Bill C-36, a law that modified the Canadian Criminal Code with respect to offenses related to prostitution. Several other songs on the album, including "Trophy Wife" and "Boys Like You", also relate to sexual politics. This theme was carried into the album launch show, which included a taping of Dan Savage's Savage Love podcast, and featured sex worker advocate Terri-Jean Bedford participating in a panel discussion.

Financial support for the recording came from FACTOR and the Ontario Media Development Corporation.

== Reception ==
On Metacritic, the album holds a score of 78/100 based on 4 reviews, indicating "generally favourable reviews".

Kyle Mullin, writing for Exclaim!, called Panther in the Dollhouse "one of the best albums of the summer, if not the year", and identified "Boys Like You" as one of the best songs on the album. Hal Horowitz, reviewing the album for American Songwriter, described Whitehorse's genre as "impossible to pigeonhole" and praised the album's production; Horowitz considered "Nighthawks" to be a highlight of the album. Chrissie Dickinson, wrote in the Chicago Tribune that the first single ("Boys Like You") is a "rhythm-heavy and shivery rock-pop song", and the accompanying video is "sleek and cinematic sendup of rock & roll stardom". Steve Horowitz rated the album 7/10, and said "the music has a strong, charismatic appeal" in his review for PopMatters. James Fenney, writing in Never Enough Notes, said that Whitehorse "swapped Americana for slick noir rock" for this album, and that "Whitehorse’s successes outweigh the problematic moments on Panther in the Dollhouse", rating the album 3/5.

== Track listing ==
1. Epitaph in Tongues
2. Boys Like You
3. Die Alone
4. Trophy Wife
5. Pink Kimono
6. Kicking Down Your Door
7. Gracie
8. I Can't Take You With Me (Charlene's Theme)
9. Nighthawks
10. Manitoba Death Star

== Credits ==
Credits are taken from the album liner notes.

All songs were written by Melissa McClelland and Luke Doucet, with the addition of Gus Van Go on Pink Kimono, and the addition of Gus Van Go, Werner F, Chris Soper and Jesse Singer on Nighthawks.

Production was by Gus Van Go and Werner F, with addition production by Likeminds.

Melissa McClelland and Luke Doucet: Vocals, guitars, percussion

Gus Van Go: Bass, percussion

Werner F: Additional guitars

Jesse Singer: Drums, drum programming, bass, synthesizers, percussion

Chris Soper: Drum programming, B3 organ, electric piano, piano, synthesizers.
