= Whitehorse (album) =

Studio album by Whitehorse
- Released: August 9, 2011 (Digital); August 30, 2011
- Studios: Catherine North Studios, The Bathouse, Sarah's Place
- Genres: Indie rock, country
- Length: 24:18
- Label: Six Shooter Records
- Producer: Luke Doucet

Whitehorse chronology
Whitehorse (2011)	The Fate of the World Depends on This Kiss (2012)

Whitehorse is the self-titled album from Whitehorse, a band consisting of Melissa McClelland and Luke Doucet. The album was released on August 30, 2011 in Canada by Six Shooter Records. It was made available for digital download on August 9, 2011.

== Background ==
McClelland and Doucet had recorded and toured together for over six years, but decided to make records together that were more collaborative. Doucet explained, "We have a more definable sound as Whitehorse than individually. There is chemistry ― an artistic union does produce something larger than the sum of its parts.", and further "We murdered the singer-songwriter in each of us to be Whitehorse." About the debut album he said, "This record is about introducing Whitehorse as a band, as an entity and as a musical marriage."

== Critical reception ==
Earshot Magazine gave a positive review, calling it a “bold debut”, and saying that McClelland and Doucet's "well honed solo musical careers blend together like a perfect chemistry mixture."

== Personnel ==
- Melissa McClelland: vocals, acoustic guitar
- Luke Doucet: vocals, Gretsch White Falcon (and other electric guitars), acoustic guitar, bass, pedal steel, piano, organ, banjo
- Barry Mirochnick: drums, Hammond B3, bass and vocals on "Killing Time is Murder", drums on "Emerald Isle" and "Passenger 24"
- Pat Steward: drums on "Broken" and "I'm On Fire"
- Doug Elliott: bass on "Broken" and "I'm On Fire"

== Track listing ==
1. "Eulogy for Whiskers, Part I"
2. "Killing Time is Murder"
3. "Emerald Isle"
4. "Passenger 24"
5. "Broken"
6. "I'm On Fire"
7. "Night Owls"
8. "Eulogy for Whiskers, Part II"
- All songs written by Luke Doucet & Melissa McClellend, except "Broken" was written by Luke Doucet, Melissa McClellend & Sean MacDonald; and "I'm On Fire" was written by Bruce Springsteen.
