= Whitehorse (band) =

Canadian folk rock band

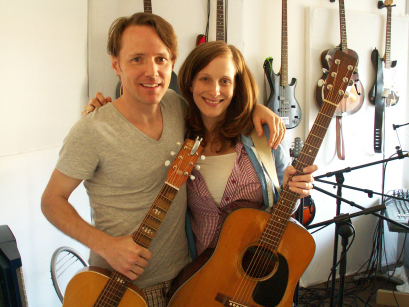
- Melissa McClelland and Luke Doucet, 2012

Background information
- Origin: Hamilton, Ontario, Canada
- Genres: Folk rock
- Years active: 2011–present
- Label: Six Shooter
- Members: Luke Doucet; Melissa McClelland
- Website: whitehorsemusic.ca

Whitehorse is a Canadian folk roots band, composed of husband-and-wife duo Luke Doucet and Melissa McClelland. Based in Hamilton, Ontario, Doucet and McClelland were both established singer-songwriters before opting to put their solo careers on hold to work together as Whitehorse.

== Bio ==
Doucet and McClelland toured in each other's bands for years before forming Whitehorse in 2010. They have since released three albums and two EPs on Six Shooter Records.

In July 2013, their second album The Fate of the World Depends on This Kiss was shortlisted for the 2013 Polaris Music Prize. That year, they also played their first show at Massey Hall, one of Canada's most storied music venues; to mark the occasion leading up to it, they released The Road to Massey Hall, an EP comprising cover versions of songs written and performed by other artists who had previously performed there.

In 2014, they released Éphémère sans repère, an EP of French language versions of several of their songs. Lyric translations for the EP were provided by Pierre Marchand.

Their third full-length album, Leave No Bridge Unburned, was released on February 17, 2015 and won the Juno Award for Adult Alternative Album of the Year at the Juno Awards of 2016.

Panther in the Dollhouse is their fourth studio album. The album was released via Six Shooter Records on July 7, 2017.

Their album All I Want Is All of It was released on May 8, 2026, via Six Shooter Records.

== Live performance ==
Whitehorse performs live as a duo. While both Doucet and McClelland play guitar as their primary instruments as singer-songwriters, as Whitehorse, each performs on a number of instruments.

The band makes extensive use of live looping; most commonly by opening many songs by creating layered drum and percussion loops to serve as a rhythm track. They also loop instrumental portions and vocal phrases in some songs. Doucet generally plays the drum kit parts with McClelland adding other percussion elements. McClelland plays bass guitar and keyboards along with acoustic (and occasionally electric) guitar. Other than drums, Doucet generally plays electric (or acoustic outfitted to sound as an electric) guitar, with occasional keyboards. The duo also often uses several different vocal mics to achieve different sounds.

== Discography ==
=== Studio albums ===
- Whitehorse (2011)
- The Fate of the World Depends on This Kiss (2012)
- Leave No Bridge Unburned (2015)
- Panther in the Dollhouse (2017)
- A Whitehorse Winter Classic (2018)
- Modern Love (2021)
- Strike Me Down (2021)
- I'm Not Crying, You're Crying (2023)
- All I Want Is All of It (2026)

=== EPs ===
- The Road to Massey Hall (2013)
- Éphémère sans repère (2014)
- The Northern South, Vol. 1 (2016)
- The Northern South, Vol. 2 (2019)

== Awards and nominations ==
Year	Award	Category	Nominated work	Result
2012	Canadian Folk Music Awards	Vocal Group of the Year	Whitehorse	Nominated
2012	Canadian Folk Music Awards	Ensemble of the Year	Whitehorse	Nominated
2012	Canadian Folk Music Awards	Contemporary Album of the Year	Whitehorse	Nominated
2012	Hamilton Music Awards	Female Vocalist of the Year	Melissa McClelland	Nominated
2012	Hamilton Music Awards	Songwriter of the Year	The Fate of the World Depends on This Kiss	Nominated
2012	Hamilton Music Awards	Record of the Year	The Fate of the World Depends on This Kiss	Nominated
2012	Hamilton Music Awards	Adult Alternative Recording of the Year	The Fate of the World Depends on This Kiss	Won
2013	Polaris Music Prize	Polaris Music Prize Shortlist	The Fate of the World Depends on This Kiss	Nominated
2015	Canadian Folk Music Awards	Ensemble of the Year	Leave No Bridge Unburned	Nominated
2015	Canadian Folk Music Awards	Pushing the Boundaries	Leave No Bridge Unburned	Nominated
2015	Polaris Music Prize	Polaris Music Prize Longlist	Leave No Bridge Unburned	Nominated
2016	Juno Awards	Adult Alternative Album of the Year	Leave No Bridge Unburned	Won
2016	Canadian Folk Music Awards	Ensemble of the Year	The Northern South, Vol. 1	Nominated
2016	Canadian Folk Music Awards	Pushing the Boundaries	The Northern South, Vol. 1	Nominated
2017	Juno Awards	Blues Album of the Year	The Northern South, Vol. 1	Nominated
2023	Canadian Country Music Awards	Alternative Country Album of the Year	I'm Not Crying, You're Crying	Nominated
