= South Texas Suite =

EP by Whitney Rose
- Released: January 27, 2017
- Genre: Country music
- Length: 22:23
- Label: Six Shooter Records, Thirty Tigers

Whitney Rose chronology
Heartbreaker of the Year (2015)	South Texas Suite (2017)	We Still Go to Rodeos (2020)

Professional ratings
Aggregate scores
Source	Rating
Metacritic	76/100
Review scores
Source	Rating
AllMusic	4/5 stars
American Songwriter	3.5/5 stars
Exclaim!	(7/10)
PopMatters	7/10 stars
Vice (Expert Witness)	A-

South Texas Suite is an EP by Canadian-American country singer-songwriter Whitney Rose. It was released on January 27, 2017 by both Six Shooter Records and Thirty Tigers.

== Track listing ==
1. "Three Minute Love Affair"
2. "Analog"
3. "My Boots"
4. "Bluebonnets for My Baby"
5. "Lookin' Back on Luckenbach"
6. "How 'Bout a Hand for the Band"

== Personnel ==
- Earl Poole Ball – piano
- Cris Burns – engineering, mastering, mixing
- Bryce Clarke – electric and acoustic guitars
- Ben Clarkson – artwork
- Michael Guerra – accordion
- Erik Hokkanen – fiddle
- Sophia Johnson – acoustic guitar
- Terri Joyce – composition
- Brennen Leigh – composition
- Tom Lewis – drums, percussion
- James Mejia – design, layout
- Whitney Rose – composition, production, vocals
- James Shelton – steel guitar
- Kevin Smith – bass
- Redd Volkaert – electric guitar
