= Souljah Fyah =

Canadian reggae band

- Origin: Edmonton, Canada
- Genres: Roots reggae, dancehall
- Years active: 2001–present
- Members: Waymatea (Janaya) Ellis; Dorant Ricketts; Paul Joosse; Norm Frizzell; Bongbeimi Nfor
- Past members: Olivia Street; Derrick Sine; Kevin Prebushewski

Souljah Fyah is a Canadian reggae/dancehall band from Edmonton, founded in 2002 by vocalist/bassist Waymatea (Janaya) "Sista J" Ellis. As of 2016, they have released four studio albums.

== Career ==
Souljah Fyah released their debut, self-titled album, in 2004. Their second record, Truth Will Reveal, released in 2008, was nominated for a Juno Award for Reggae Album of the Year and won both Outstanding Urban Recording at the Western Canadian Music Awards and Best Reggae Album at the 2009 Reggae Music Achievement Awards.

Souljah Fyah was named Top Reggae Band at the 2009 Canadian Reggae Music Awards. They released their third studio album, I Wish, at the end of 2010.

== Discography ==
- Souljah Fyah (2004)
- Truth Will Reveal (2008)
- I Wish (2010)
- The Long Walk (2016)
