= Shout Out Out Out Out =

Canadian dance-punk/electro group

Background information
- Origin: Edmonton, Alberta, Canada
- Genres: Dance-punk, electro house
- Years active: 2004–2019
- Label: Nrmls Wlcm Records
- Members: Nik Kozub; Jason Troock; Lyle Bell; Will Zimmerman; Gravy; Clint Frazier

Shout Out Out Out Out was a Canadian dance-punk/electro group from Edmonton, Alberta. The band's lineup is unusual in that it includes multiple drummers and bassists, as well as vintage synthesizer equipment.

== History ==
Shout Out Out Out Out was formed in 2004. The band's debut album Not Saying/Just Saying, released in 2006, garnered significant airplay on Canadian campus radio and on CBC Radio 3. The album debuted at No. 11 on Canada's national Earshot Radio Chart in August 2006, and moved up to No. 5 in the September chart.

In February 2007, Not Saying/Just Saying was nominated for the Juno Award for Alternative Album of the Year, but lost to City and Colour's Sometimes.

In 2008, the band released a split single with San Serac, "Friends"/"In the End It's Your Friends".

Their second album, Reintegration Time, was released on March 3, 2009. That year the band performed at the 2009 Virgin Festival in Baltimore.

The band's third album, Spanish Moss and Total Loss was released on July 17, 2012.

The song Bad Choices from the Reintegration Time album can be played at the player character's apartment in the Citadel DLC for the 2012 video game Mass Effect 3.

After July 2014, the band was in hiatus for three years.

== Band members ==
Band members Gravy and Lyle Bell are also associated with the band Whitey Houston, while Nik Kozub was formerly a bandmate of Luke Doucet in Veal. Lyle Bell is also involved with punk marching band The Wet Secrets. Kozub and Jason Troock are the heads of the band's label, Nrmls Wlcm Records.

Kozub has also released solo material under the name Nik 7, and remixes for other artists as The Paronomasiac.

Frazier joined with Graeme MacKinnon of Wednesday Night Heroes in the band Home Front, whose 2023 album Games of Power was produced by Kozub and Jonah Falco.

== Discography ==
=== Albums ===
- Not Saying/Just Saying (2006)
- Reintegration Time (2009)
- Spanish Moss and Total Loss (2012)

=== EPs ===
- Nobody Calls Me Unless They Want Something (2005)
- Dude You Feel Electrical (2006)
- Friends/In the End It's Your Friends (2008, split with San Serac)
