= King of Foxes (band) =

Canadian indie rock band

- Origin: Edmonton, Alberta, Canada
- Genres: Indie pop; Alternative pop; Shoegaze; Indie rock.
- Years active: 2013–present
- Members: Olivia Street
- Website: kingoffoxesband.com

King of Foxes is a Canadian indie rock band formed in 2013 in Edmonton, Alberta, led by singer-songwriter Olivia Street. King of Foxes was nominated for Rock Artist of the Year at the 2022 Western Canadian Music Awards. Their third album, released September 16, 2022, titled Twilight of the Empire, went to #1 on the CKUA Radio charts. The album was produced by Stew Kirkwood and reviewed in the Edmonton Journal and Cups 'n Cakes Network, which described the album as "a sonic rollercoaster, and one of their best."

Their second album Salt & Honey, released in 2019, was also produced by Stew Kirkwood and received positive reviews from Aesthetic Magazine, Canadian Beats and The Gateway. The album charted on the Earshot Radio Chart. Their previous studio album, Golden Armour, was released in 2016. They have performed at Breakout West in 2019, Indie Week Toronto in 2018, and Canadian Music Week in Toronto in 2019 and 2022. They opened for Barenaked Ladies, Sam Roberts Band, and 54–40 at Together Again festival in Edmonton in 2022.

== History ==
Olivia Street, the group's singer-songwriter, is the daughter of William H. Street, a classical contemporary saxophonist. She is a former member of Juno-nominated reggae group Souljah Fyah. She picked the name King of Foxes because she liked that foxes are "both the hunter and the hunted. That's the image that stuck with me, something that's both fierce and fragile." King of Foxes’ music has been described as indie rock, and as "rock and roll with a side of pop."

== Discography ==
- 2016 – Golden Armour (Self Released)
- 2019 – Salt & Honey (Self Released)
- 2022 – Twilight of the Empire (Crystal Baby Music)
- 2025 – Hall of Shame (EP)
- 2026 – Someday You’ll See Yourself as Others Surely Do, A Thing to Leave Behind

== Members ==
=== Current members ===
- Olivia Street – vocals, guitar (2013–present)

=== Associated members/performers ===
- Stew Kirkwood
- Brandon Baker
- Tony Bao
- Greg Kolodychuk
- Alexis Alchorn
- Reid Thiel
