= Leave No Bridge Unburned =

Studio album by Whitehorse
- Released: February 17, 2015
- Genre: rock
- Label: Six Shooter Records
- Producer: Gus van Go

Whitehorse chronology
Éphémère sans repère (2014)	Leave No Bridge Unburned (2015)	Panther in the Dollhouse (2017)

Leave No Bridge Unburned is the third studio album by Canadian rock band Whitehorse. Funded by Kickstarter, the album was released via Six Shooter Records on February 17, 2015.

The album was a long-listed nominee for the 2015 Polaris Music Prize, and won the Juno Award for Adult Alternative Album of the Year at the Juno Awards of 2016.

== Reception ==
Professional ratings
Aggregate scores
Source	Rating
Metacritic	84/100
Review scores
Source	Rating
American Songwriter	4/5 stars
Blurt	4/5 stars
Now Magazine	4/5 stars

Leave No Bridge Unburned received positive reviews from critics. On Metacritic, the album holds a score of 84/100 based on 4 reviews, indicating "universal acclaim".

== Track listing ==
1. Baby What's Wrong?
2. Tame as the Wild Ones
3. Downtown
4. Sweet Disaster
5. You Get Older
6. Evangelina
7. The One I Hurt
8. Dear Irony
9. Fake Your Death (And I'll Fake Mine)
10. Oh Dolores
11. The Walls Have Drunken Ears
