= Whitney Rose (musician) =

Canadian-American country musician (born 1986)

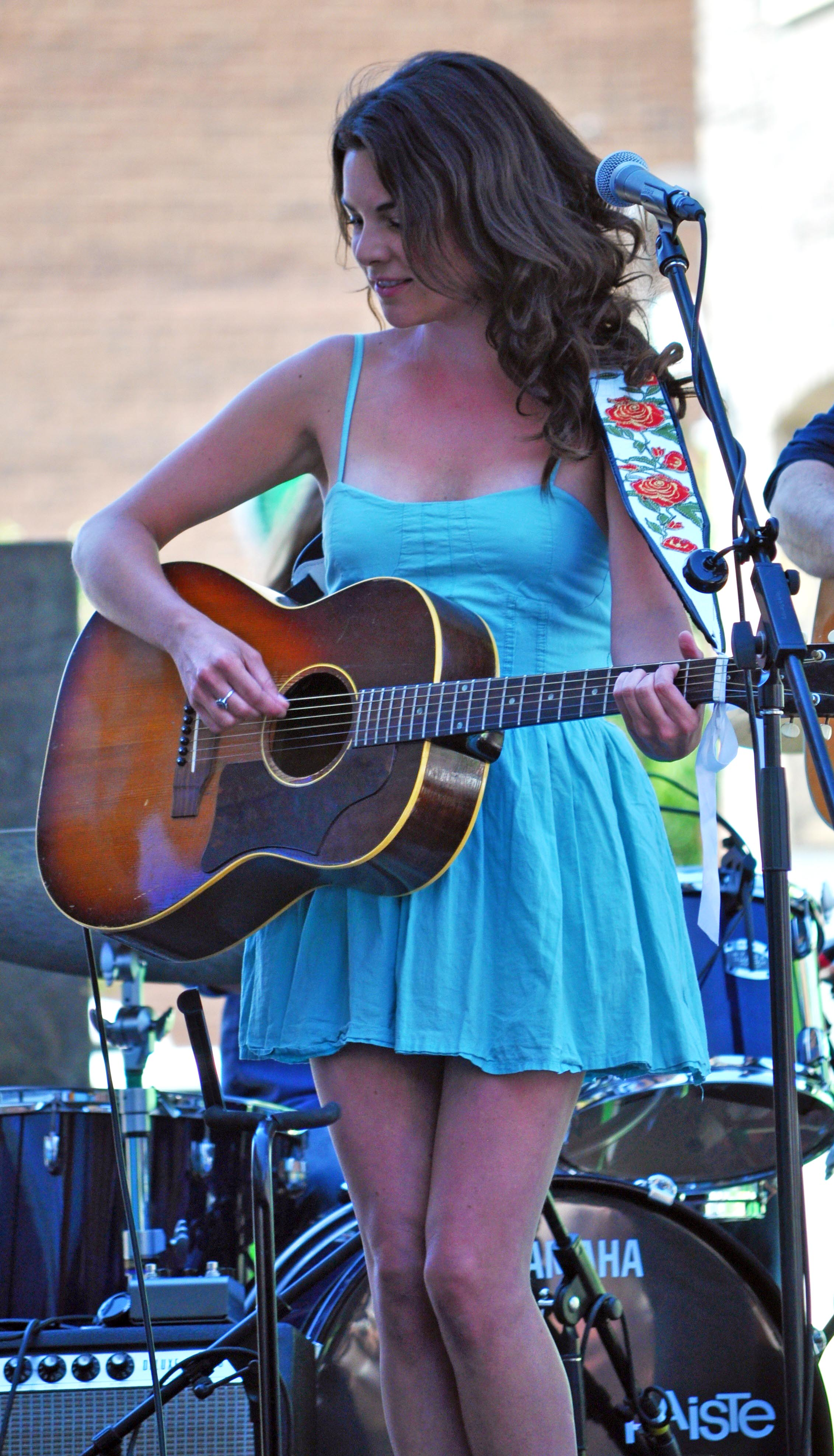
- Rose at NXNE in 2014

Background information
- Born: Whitney Rebecca Rose; May 9, 1986 (age 40); Prince Edward Island, Canada
- Genres: Country, Americana, Ameripolitan, Countrypolitan
- Occupation: Singer-songwriter
- Instrument: Gibson acoustic guitar
- Years active: 2012–present
- Labels: Cameron House Records, Six Shooter Records
- Website: whitneyrosemusic.com

Whitney Rose (born May 9, 1986) is a Canadian-American country musician from Prince Edward Island, Canada. She has released six studio albums through MCG Recordings, Cameron House Records and Six Shooter Records. Her self-titled debut album Whitney Rose was released in 2012 and Heartbreaker of the Year in 2015. The EP South Texas Suite was released in 2017. Rule 62 was released in October 2017.

Rose currently resides in Austin, Texas.

== History ==
Whitney Rebecca Rose was raised by her mother Laurie Rose and her grandparents, Jean (née Dunn) and John P. Rose (1947–2015), in Charlottetown, the capital of Prince Edward Island, where she lived in a home with her mother's younger brothers and sisters. Her grandparents ran a bar called the Union Hall. Rose's favorite song from the age of two was Hank Williams’ "There's a Tear in My Beer", which she'd sing to bar customers – sometimes crawling downstairs after her bedtime, and sometimes being paid a dollar to sing. As she jokes, "I guess it became my career pretty early on. And the pay is about the same now, too. Not much has changed."

Her grandfather's "song of choice" was the Johnny Cash classic "Ring of Fire", which she often includes in her set lists in his memory. As an 8-year-old, Rose made a road trip with her mother to Halifax, Nova Scotia where she saw The Rankin Family, a regional group that mixed Celtic and country sounds. It was her first big concert. She plays the group's music on the tour bus "because nobody really outside of the (Canadian) East Coast has even heard of them. . . I don't think it's solely nostalgia. I actually enjoy the music, too."

Rose attended five different colleges, studying journalism and majoring in English. A "starter guitar" given to her by her Uncle Dan started her writing songs. Moving to Toronto from "a farm in the middle of nowhere in Nova Scotia", and a failed relationship, she'd written enough songs for a record. In Toronto she got "immersed" in the Cameron House scene, the bar becoming a second home. She released her self-titled debut record in 2012 for fledgling Cameron House Records.

She got signed by "great booking agents" in 2013 and made a "one-off appearance" opening for U.S. country act The Mavericks in Toronto. She later toured as an opening act for Raul Malo’s band. Rose received a Gibson acoustic guitar, which she named "Aggie", as a 27th-birthday present from a boyfriend in 2013. Rose says of the instrument, "I always kind of meant it to be just a writing tool. ... It's kind of one of the biggest surprises of my life that I actually play guitar in front of people night after night because at one point it would have been absolutely my worst nightmare."

She signed with Six Shooter Records in 2016 and is managed by Michael McKeown, former president of Cameron House Records.

== Recordings ==
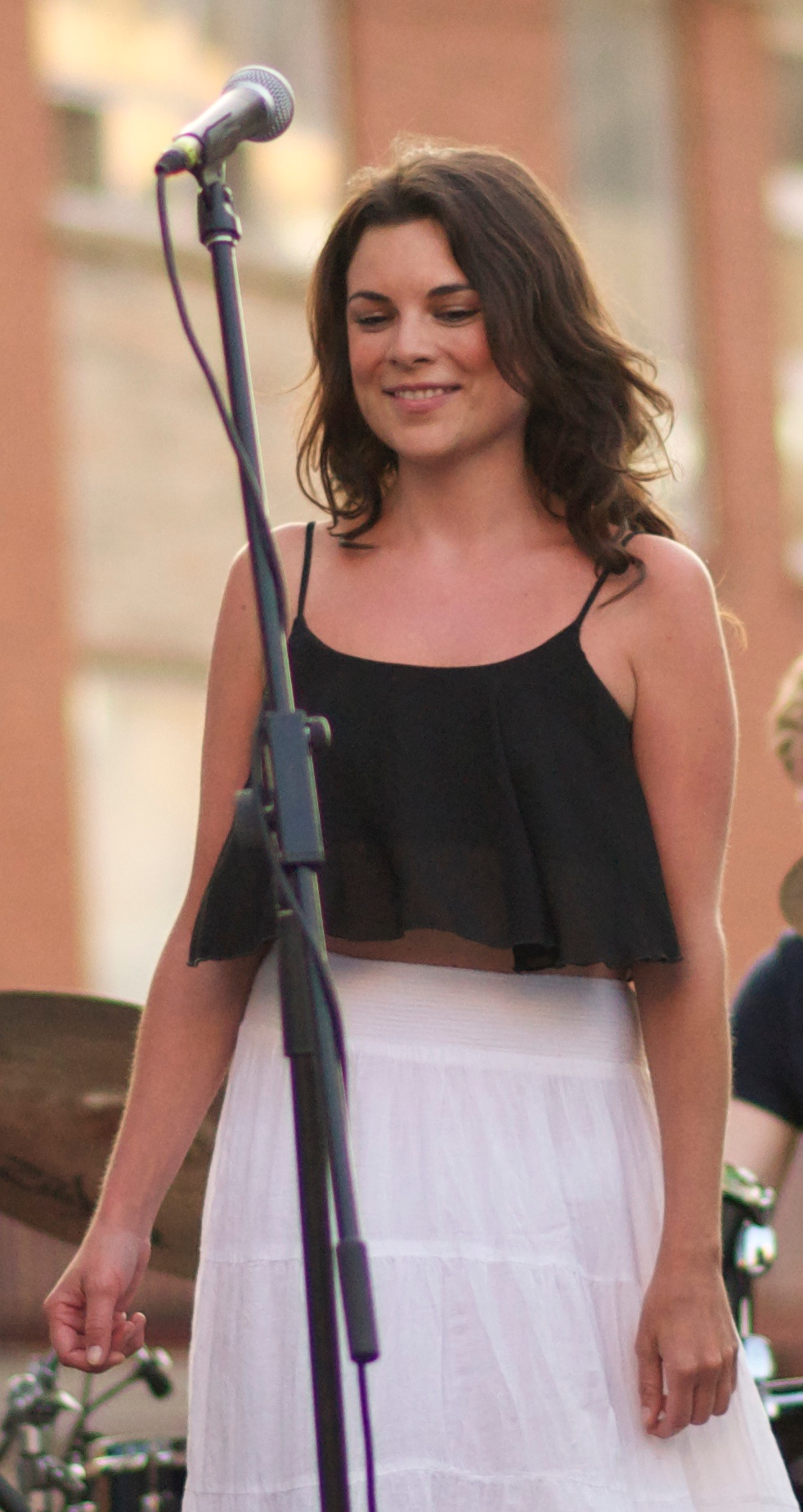
Rose at NXNE in 2014

Rose signed originally with Cameron House Records, an "offshoot of the legendary Toronto club" of the same name. She joined other artists on the label, e.g., Al Tuck, Doug Paisley, The Devin Cuddy Band, Sam Cash & The Romantic Dogs.

=== Heartbreaker of the Year (2015) ===
Rose's sophomore release was produced by The Mavericks' frontman, Raul Malo, and includes two covers: Hank Williams’ "There's a Tear in My Beer" and "Be My Baby" by the Ronettes. Rose and Malo have often sung the Nancy and Frank Sinatra duet "Somethin’ Stupid" together onstage.

American Songwriter says: "There’s a robust countrypolitan vibe to much of this, that hits its peak on the string enhanced ballad “Ain’t it Wise,” with Malo on backing vocals, sounding like a hit from the mid-’60s. Rose sings in a sweet, strong, vulnerable voice that’s both powerful and subtle, a tricky balance she pulls off with a smooth and soulful edge." They note: “The Devil Borrowed My Boots” is "terrifically crafted and brilliantly realized roots music guaranteed to provoke smiles."

Rolling Stone says on this release that Rose "playfully croons through tales of love and mischief with girlish breath and devilish twang."

. . when Mr. Malo steps in to duet, like on "The Last Party" or the Ronettes cover "Be My Baby," the two achieve a melancholy twinkle much like the one between George Jones and Tammy Wynette.

— New York Times

=== South Texas Suite (2017) ===
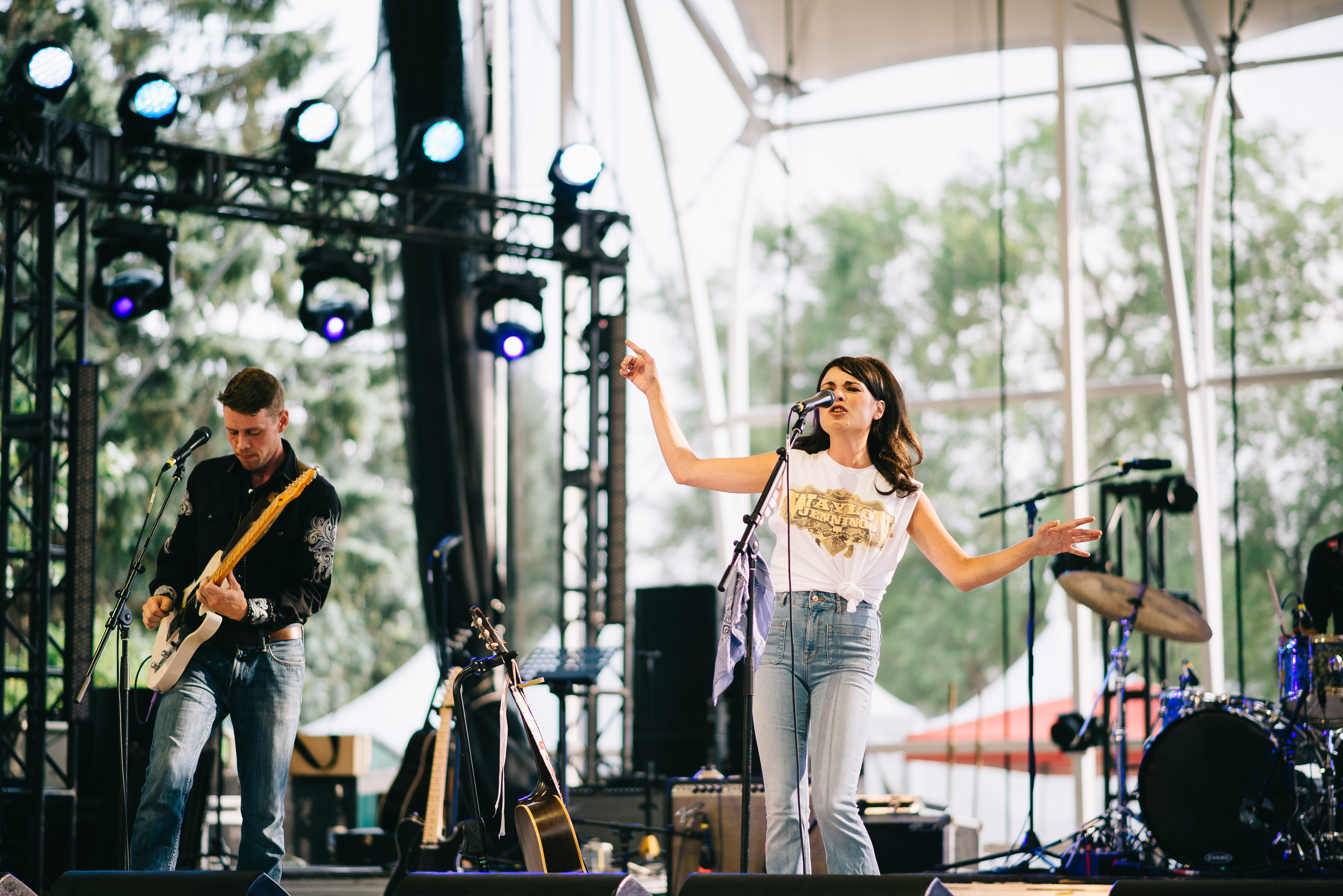
Interstellar Rodeo 2017

The EP South Texas Suite was released on January 27, 2017, by both Six Shooter Records and Thirty Tigers. Recorded at Dale Watson's Ameripolitan Studios in Austin, it is considered "Canadian countrypolitan chanteuse" Rose's love letter to the Texas capitol, her adopted home following a "winter engagement" at famed Continental Club.

Rose's honeyed voice, somewhat similar to Rosanne Cash's, perfectly captures both the sassy, strut of "My Boots" where Rose proudly wears outfits from thrift stores regardless of what's expected and the reflective ballad with exquisite fiddle and pedal steel "Looking Back on Luckenbach," a love letter to that city.

— Hal Horowitz, American Songwriter

The EP is runs less than 25 minutes—with a "brief instrumental breakdown" as the last track. PopMatters says of Rose's recording, "She sings as if the Lone Star state was hers."

=== Rule 62 (2017) ===
Produced by Raul Malo, with co-production by Niko Bolas, Rule 62 boasts the musicianship of Paul Deakin of The Mavericks on drums and Aaron Till of Asleep at the Wheel. On bass was Jay Weaver who's worked with Dolly Parton and Tanya Tucker. Jen Gunderman played piano, Chris Scruggs worked the steel guitar, and Kenny Vaughn strummed lead guitar.

==== Tracks ====
1. I Don't Want Half (I Just Want Out)
2. Arizona
3. Better to My Baby
4. You Never Cross My Mind
5. You Don't Scare Me
6. Can't Stop Shakin’
7. Tied to the Wheel
8. Trucker's Funeral
9. Wake Me in Wyoming
10. You're a Mess
11. Time to Cry

The album title derives from an Alcoholics Anonymous’ suggestion, officially stated "Don't Take Yourself Too Damn Seriously.”

Recorded in Nashville, TN at Blackbird Studio A, Rule 62 released October 6, 2017 on Six Shooter Records through Thirty Tigers.

==== Production ====
- Sean Badum – recording, mixing
- Niko Bolas – recording, mixing
- Lauren Adams – assistant engineer
- Jory Roberts – assistant engineer
- Richard Dodd – mastering

"Chris Scruggs’ steel, Aaron Till's fiddle and Jen Gunderman's piano and organ are perfectly staged, and Rose is commanding as she eases herself into songs whose classic tones belie their originality."

— Hyperbolium, No Depression

== Style ==
"countrypolitan chanteuse" Rose writes and performs traditional and contemporary American country music. She refers humorously to her style as "vintage-pop-infused-neo-traditional-country."

== Influences ==
Turning her nose up at her family collection of more currently popular fare, Rose favored the "queen bees" of Nashville like Kitty Wells, Tammy Wynette, and Dolly Parton. She also preferred "country kingpins" like Hank Williams, George Jones, and Keith Whitley. Rummaging through her grandparents’ cassette tapes, she discovered the Ronettes and "the ‘Runaround Sue’ guy," Dion DiMucci. Of her taste for music, Rose says, "I still listen to that stuff today. And I did even through my teenage years. My friends never wanted to drive with me because I would not be listening to like quote-unquote cool music."

She participated in a Judy Garland tribute show, really getting into 1940s music. "I’m a huge Judy Garland fan," she says.

== Personal ==
Rose has six "half-siblings" and she utilizes technology to feel closer to her family and friends "back home". She says her grandmother is "probably the only person who I stay in touch with every single day. We talk and text a lot. A lot, a lot."

== Discography ==
=== Studio albums ===
- Whitney Rose (2012, Cameron House)
- Heartbreaker of the Year (2015, Cameron House)
- Rule 62 (2017, Six Shooter Records)
- We Still Go to Rodeos (2020, MCG Recordings)
- Rosie (2023, MCG Recordings)

=== EPs ===
- South Texas Suite (2017, Six Shooter Records)

== Honors, awards, distinctions ==
- Rose's third studio album Rule 62 (2017), composed of her original songs, was rated an AllMusic Best Albums of 2017, Wide Open Country 25 Best Albums of 2017, and Yahoo! Music Best Country Albums of 2017, among other honors.
