= Glengarry Bhoys =

Celtic fusion band (founded 1998)

- Origin: Glengarry County, Ontario, Canada
- Genres: Celtic fusion
- Years active: 1998–present
- Members: Graham Wright; Gaye Stuart "Ziggy" Leroux; D'Arcy Furniss; Steve McIntosh
- Past members: Ewen McIntosh; Derek MacGregor; Shelley Downing; Nigel "Gibby" Bazinet; James Libbey; Miranda Mulholland; Ewan Brown; Graham Smith
- Website: www.glengarrybhoys.com

The Glengarry Bhoys, founded in 1998, is a Celtic fusion band blending traditional Scottish and Irish music with modern Celtic and contemporary sounds. Initially called the Graham Wright Band, they changed their name to reflect their heritage and the place where they hail from: Glengarry County, Ontario, Canada. The band's original members were Graham Wright (lead vocals, guitars, tin whistle), Gaye Stuart "Ziggy" Leroux (vocals, drums, percussion, bodhrán), Ewen McIntosh (bass, vocals), and Derek MacGregor (highland pipes, shuttle pipes, tin whistle).

McIntosh and MacGregor left the band in 2000 and were replaced by a succession of pipers and bassists. In 2002, the band was expanded to include Shelley Downing on fiddle. A permanent bassist, Nigel "Gibby" Bazinet, and permanent piper, James Libbey (highland pipes, small pipes, whistles, keyboards, spoons, trumpet), were found and added to the line-up. In September 2005, Downing, Libbey and Bazinet left the Glengarry Bhoys to pursue other interests. Downing was replaced by Miranda Mulholland (vocals, fiddle), Libbey was replaced with Ewan Brown (highland pipes, shuttle pipes, electric pipes, whistles, vocals), and Bazinet was replaced by Graham Smith (double bass, electric bass).

On 26 October 2007, it was reported that Graham Wright, co-founder and leader of the Glengarry Bhoys, had been experiencing serious medical problems and could no longer tour, resulting in the band disbanding. In January 2008, the band announced that Graham was feeling better and was looking forward to touring. On March 28, the Glengarry Bhoys announced a limited return to the touring. Mulholland, Smith, and Brown are no longer with the band; Mulholland has been replaced by D'Arcy Furniss (fiddle) and Steve McIntosh has taken on the role of bassist and piper.

== Discography ==
- 1999: Home Again (a.k.a. The Graham Wright Band)
- 1999: Full Contact Highlanding
- 1999: The Gathering
- 1999: Exile
- 2002: Juice
- 2004: Rhoots
- 2004: Mountain Road
- 2004: "In a Big Country" (single)
- 2006: Mill Sessions
- 2010: Eight
- 2011: Glengarry Bhoys Compilation
