= Aloha, Manitoba =

Studio album by Luke Doucet
- Released: December 19, 2001
- Genre: Indie rock; Country
- Label: Six Shooter

Luke Doucet chronology
Aloha, Manitoba (2001)	Outlaws (Live & Unreleased) (2004)

Aloha, Manitoba is Luke Doucet's debut studio album. The album was released in 2001 in Canada. It was the first release of Toronto record label, Six Shooter Records. Doucet remains with the label currently, and has released all of his subsequent albums with them. Bazil Donovan, Barry Mirochnick, Lloyd Peterson, Christine Fellows, Sky Onosson and Gilles Fournier performed on the record. Steve Kane, CEO of Warner Music Canada cited the album as one of his favorite records.

== Track listing ==
1. "Outlaws"
2. "Vanessa"
3. "New York"
4. "Mitzi's"
5. "Leroy"
6. "Rasputin"
7. "Another Woman"
8. "Blue Dahlia"
9. "The Defector"
10. "New Orleans"
11. "The Anxious Ballerina"
12. "Pedro"
