= Mike Plume =

- Born: May 28, 1968 (age 58)
- Origin: Moncton, New Brunswick, Canada
- Genres: Country, Rock
- Occupation: Singer-songwriter
- Years active: 1993–present

Mike Plume (born May 28, 1968) is a Canadian country music singer and songwriter. He was born in Moncton, New Brunswick, then moved to Bonnyville Alberta.

== Background ==
Canadian singer-songwriter Mike Plume fronts his roots-based namesake band. His first record, Songs From a Northern Town, was recorded in Texas and released in 1993 Touring with groups like Blue Rodeo helped build the group's following, and their 1998 album Song & Dance, Man has won them more fans and awards. In 2009 he released the album 8:30 Newfoundland, followed in June 2013 by the new album Red and White Blues.

== Discography / Bibliography ==
=== Albums ===
Year	Album Title
1993	Songs From a Northern Town
1996	Jump Back Kerouac
1997	Simplify
1997	Song And Dance, Man
2000	Steel Belted Radio EP
2001	Fools for the Radio
2003	Table For One
2003	Born So Long Ago (Live) CD
2003	Born So Long Ago (Live) DVD
2004	Rock And Roll Recordings... Volume 1
2009	8:30 Newfoundland
2013	Red and White Blues
2016	Back Home For Christmas
2018	Born by the Radio
2020	A Lonesome Stretch of Highway

=== EPs ===
Year	EP Title
2022	The Song Harvester Vol. 1

=== Singles ===
Year	Song Title
2013	So Long Stompin' Tom
2017	On Remembrance Day
2018	More Than A Game (2014 Version)
2020	We Are One (Dandelions)
2021	Shreveport To L.A.
2022	Waiting For The Fall
2023	Dance Ruby Dance

=== Books ===
Year	Book Title
2021	"More Than A Game" - Children's Book About Hockey
