= Broken (And Other Rogue States) =

Studio album by Luke Doucet
- Released: October 27, 2005
- Genres: Indie rock, country
- Length: 47:35
- Label: Six Shooter
- Producer: Luke Doucet

Luke Doucet chronology
| Outlaws (2004) | Broken (And Other Rogue States) (2005) | Fokestar (2006) |

Professional ratings
Review scores
| Source | Rating |
|---|---|
| AllMusic | 3.5/5 stars |

Broken (And Other Rogue States) is Luke Doucet's second studio album. The album was released in 2005 in Canada. A break-up album, Broken focused on the heartbreak of a failed relationship. Broken was nominated for a 2006 Juno Award in the Adult Alternative Album of the Year category.

== Track listing ==
All songs were written by Luke Doucet, except where noted.

1. "Brother"
2. "Broken One" (Doucet, Shawn McDonald)
3. "Stumbling Gingerly Back to Emily's Apartment"
4. "Emily, Please"
5. "Lucky Strikes"
6. "Wallow"
7. "It's Not the Liquor I Miss"
8. "One Too Many"
9. "Vladivostok"
10. "If I Drop Names of Exotic Towns That You'll Never See, in the Songs That I Write, It's That That's All I Have When I Miss My Girl & You're Taking Yours Home Tonight"
11. "Free"
12. "No Love to Be Made Here Now"
13. "Keep Her Away from Me"
