= San Serac =

American musician

San Serac is a one-man disco music group performed by Nat Rabb. San Serac’s music combines esoteric philosophical lyrics with electronic music reminiscent of '80s Prince, Pet Shop Boys or Cameo. San Serac has released three full-length albums and a 3" CD single on Frog Man Jake Records, and a 12" on Output Recordings.

In 2006, San Serac performed at North East Sticks Together. In 2007, he completed a full United States tour with Junior Boys, and also played tours in the U.S. and Canada with Shout Out Out Out Out and Tigercity.

A new San Serac EP, Music Never Ends, was released by Environ on November 10, 2009.

== Discography ==
- Ghosts (3" CD single, 2001) (with Zek Lightning)
- Human Savagery Is a Slippery Slope (2003)
- Ice Age (2004)
- Professional (2007)
- Friends/In the End It's Your Friends (2008, split with Shout Out Out Out Out)
