= Tilt O'Whirl =

Studio album by Veal
- Released: 1999
- Producer: Michael Phillip Wojewoda & Veal

Veal chronology
Hot Loser (1996)	Tilt O'Whirl (1999)	The Embattled Hearts (2003)

Tilt O'Whirl is Veal's second album. Produced by Michael Phillip Wojewoda, the album was released in 1999 in Canada.

One critic described it as having "a distinct pop sensibility", while also "just enough rawness to give it an unconventional edge".

Veal toured extensively in Canada to support the album. The single "Skid" reached number three on the campus radio station CJSW-FM chart.

== Track listing ==
1. "Spiderman" (4:13)
2. "Skid" (3:21)
3. "Peroxide" (3:55)
4. "Harold's End" (5:45)
5. "Graduation" (2:43)
6. "Happy as Pye" (4:37)
7. "Pinkos" (4:18)
8. "Buttercloud" (3:25)
9. "Monkey Tree" (3:19)
10. "Po Black Child" (4:13)
11. "Centre of the Universe" (3:18)
12. "Underground" (1:18)
13. "Weary Head" (5:19)

== Album personnel ==
=== Veal ===
- Luke Doucet – lead vocals, drums, and many more
- Howard Redekopp – bass guitar, vocals

=== Production ===
- Michael Phillip Wojewoda – producer
- Veal – producer
- Howard Redekopp – engineer
