= Jubilee (The Deep Dark Woods album) =

Album by The Deep Dark Woods

Studio album by The Deep Dark Woods
- Released: September 30, 2013
- Recorded: Beaver House at Folk Tree Lodge, Bragg Creek, AB using the "Porta-Recorda" Studio.
- Genre: Alternative country
- Length: 65:41
- Language: English
- Label: Sugar Hill Records
- Producer: Jonathan Wilson

The Deep Dark Woods chronology
The Place I Left Behind	Jubilee

Singles from Jubilee
- 1. "December 18" Released: 2013

Professional ratings
Review scores
Source	Rating
AllMusic	3.5/5 stars

Jubilee is the fifth studio album by Canadian alternative country band The Deep Dark Woods. The record was released on September 30, 2013 through Sugar Hill Records. "18th of December" was released as the first single from the album.

== Track listing ==
All songs written by Ryan Boldt except "Miles and Miles", "East St. Louis," and "The Beater" written by Chris Mason. "The Same Thing," "Red, Red Rose," and "Picture on My Wall" written by Ryan Boldt and Clayton Linthicum. "Bourbon Street" written by Chris Mason and Burke Barlow.

1. "Miles and Miles" - 5:28
2. "18th of December" - 3:50
3. "Picture on My Wall" - 4:32
4. "Red, Red Rose" - 2:16
5. "Gonna Have A Jubilee" - 4:02
6. "Pacing the Room" - 5:17
7. "East St. Louis" - 5:43
8. "A Voice is Calling" - 5:43
9. "I Took to Whoring" - 3:57
10. "It's Been a Long Time" - 3:26
11. "Bourbon Street" - 4:05
12. "The Beater" - 6:53
13. "The Same Thing" - 10:29

== Personnel ==
- Ryan Boldt - vocals, guitars, bass guitar
- Chris Mason - vocals, bass guitar, guitar, novachord
- Lucas Goetz - vocals, drums/percussion, pedal steel
- Geoff Hilhorst - piano, organs, wurlitzer, novachord, celesta, mellotron, vibraphone
- Clayton Linthicum - guitars, autoharp
