= Hot Loser =

Studio album by Veal
- Released: 1996

Veal chronology
Hot Loser (1996)	Tilt O'Whirl (1999)

Hot Loser is Veal's first album. The album was released in 1996 in Canada.

Critical reception was generally positive. The album received a mixed review from Allmusic's Gary Hill, who wrote, "At their best, they come across as a new version of Camper Van Beethoven or Cracker." Darren Gawle of Drop-D magazine also wrote a mixed review.

In 2023, the album was made available on streaming services, corresponding to a reunion tour for Veal.

== Track listing ==
1. "Sugar Pants" (3:17)
2. "Mexico Texaco" (4:15)
3. "Hot Loser, Part 1" (2:23)
4. "Cauchemar" (2:59)
5. "In Bed With the Pope" (2:54)
6. "Down Again" (4:40)
7. "Cheesecake" (6:01)
8. "Nails & Snails" (4:00)
9. "Two Heads" (3:24)
10. "Almond Joy" (4:29)
11. "Girlfriend" (3:19)
12. "Apple" (0:54)
