= XOK =

Studio album by NQ Arbuckle
- Released: June 10, 2008
- Genre: Alternative country
- Length: 50:22
- Label: Six Shooter Records
- Producer: Luke Doucet

NQ Arbuckle chronology
Last Supper in a Cheap Town (2005)	XOK (2008)	Let's Just Stay Here (2009)

Professional ratings
Review scores
Source	Rating
Toronto Star	3.5/5 stars
CHARTattack	4/5 stars
Noizemag	(favourable)

XOK is the third studio album by Canadian alternative country band NQ Arbuckle. It was released on June 10, 2008, on Six Shooter Records.

The album received generally favourable reviews, and was nominated for the Roots & Traditional Album of the Year (Group) at the 2009 Juno Awards.

== Track listing ==
All tracks are written by NQ Arbuckle except where noted.

No.	Title	Writer(s)	Length
1.	"My Baby"		4:37
2.	"Part of a poem by Alden Nowlan called Ypres: 1915"	Alden Nowlan	5:17
3.	"XOK"		4:42
4.	"Postcard from Princess"		2:49
5.	"Marco Polo"		5;17
6.	"I Liked You Right from the Start"		5:48
7.	"Ontario, Michigan"		5:53
8.	"Huntsville Affair"		4:05
9.	"Mincing Words"		3:40
10.	"Don't Remember Me"		2:52
11.	"Spooking the Rocking Horse"		5:22
