= Six Shooter Records =

Record label

- Founded: 2000
- Founder: Shauna de Cartier
- Genre: Indie
- Country of origin: Canada
- Location: Toronto, Ontario
- Official website: sixshooterrecords.com

Six Shooter Records is an independent record label based in Toronto, Ontario, Canada, that uses an artist-centric business model, focusing on art before commerce combined with extensive touring. Six Shooter Records was founded in 2000 by Shauna de Cartier. The mission statement of the company is Life is Too Short to Listen to Shitty Music.

In addition to production and sales of music, the company is involved in artist management, festival production, concert promotion and song publishing. The management arm of the company is run by de Cartier and partner Helen Britton. Notable festivals include the Interstellar Rodeo (Edmonton: 2012–2019 and Winnipeg: 2015-2017) and the Sleepwalker Guitar Festival (Toronto).

Several releases on Six Shooter Records have received awards and critical acclaim from music critics, including music from Canadian folk rock band Whitehorse, Canadian experimental vocalist Tanya Tagaq, Americana band The Deep Dark Woods, and country artist Whitney Rose.

Six Shooter Records is distributed by Universal Music in Canada and by The Orchard outside of Canada.

== Roster ==
- Del Barber
- The Beauties
- Boy Golden
- Richard Buckner
- C&C Surf Factory
- Captain Tractor
- Amelia Curran
- The Dead South
- The Deep Dark Woods
- Luke Doucet
- Elliott Brood
- Christine Fellows
- Mary Gauthier
- The Good Lovelies
- Valery Gore
- Jenn Grant
- July Talk
- Melissa McClelland
- Wendy McNeill
- Danny Michel
- Mauvey
- NQ Arbuckle
- Nick Buzz
- Joe Nolan
- Nyssa
- Sam Outlaw
- Harlan Pepper
- Ford Pier
- William Prince
- Rheostatics
- Whitney Rose
- Justin Rutledge
- Shakey Graves
- The Strumbellas
- Tanya Tagaq
- Martin Tielli
- Trampled by Turtles
- Veal
- Henry Wagons
- Skye Wallace
- The Wet Secrets
- Whitehorse
- Hawksley Workman
- Chris Wynters

== Albums ==
| Artist | Title | Year |
|---|---|---|
| Richard Buckner | The Hill | 2000 |
| Captain Tractor | Celebrity Traffic Jam | 2000 |
| Captain Tractor | Hoserista | 2000 |
| Veal | Tilt O'Whirl | 2000 |
| Luke Doucet | Aloha, Manitoba | 2001 |
| Martin Tielli | We Didn't Even Suspect That He Was the Poppy Salesman | 2001 |
| Christine Fellows | The Last One Standing | 2002 |
| Nick Buzz | Circo | 2002 |
| Martin Tielli | Operation Infinite Joy | 2003 |
| Veal | The Embattled Hearts | 2003 |
| Luke Doucet | Outlaws (Live & Unreleased) | 2004 |
| Ford Pier | Pier-ic Victory | 2004 |
| Captain Tractor | North of the Yellowhead | 2005 |
| Luke Doucet | Broken (and other rogue states) | 2005 |
| Elliott Brood | Ambassador | 2005 |
| Christine Fellows | Paper Anniversary | 2005 |
| Valery Gore | Valery Gore | 2005 |
| NQ Arbuckle | The Last Supper in a Cheap Town | 2005 |
| Justin Rutledge | No Never Alone | 2005 |
| Chris Wynters | Skywriting | 2005 |
| Justin Rutledge | The Devil on a Bench in Stanley Park | 2006 |
| Christine Fellows | Nevertheless | 2007 |
| Wendy McNeill | The Wonder Show | 2007 |
| Ford Pier | Organ Farming | 2007 |
| Amelia Curran | War Brides | 2008 |
| Luke Doucet | Blood's Too Rich | 2008 |
| Elliott Brood | Mountain Meadows | 2008 |
| Wendy McNeill | A Dreamer's Guide to Hardcore Living | 2008 |
| NQ Arbuckle | XOK | 2008 |
| Justin Rutledge | Man Descending | 2008 |
| Amelia Curran | Hunter, Hunter | 2009 |
| Jenn Grant | Echoes | 2009 |
| Melissa McClelland | Victoria Day | 2009 |
| Martin Tielli | The Ghost of Danny Gross | 2009 |
| The Beauties | The Beauties | 2010 |
| Luke Doucet | Steel City Trawler | 2010 |
| Justin Rutledge | The Early Widows | 2010 |
| Christine Fellows | Femmes de chez nous | 2011 |
| The Deep Dark Woods | The Place I Left Behind | 2011 |
| Whitehorse | Whitehorse | 2011 |
| Joe Nolan | Beautiful Cinderella | 2011 |
| Del Barber | Headwaters | 2012 |
| Whitehorse | The Fate of the World Depends on This Kiss | 2012 |
| The Deep Dark Woods | Jubilee | 2013 |
| Tanya Tagaq | Animism | 2014 |
| Joe Nolan | Tornado | 2014 |
| Harlan Pepper | Take Out a $20 and Live Life to the Fullest | 2014 |
| Amelia Curran | They Promised You Mercy | 2014 |
| Henry Wagons | Acid Rain and Sugar Cane | 2014 |
| Mary Gauthier | Trouble and Love | 2014 |
| NQ Arbuckle | The Future Happens Anyway | 2014 |
| Shakey Graves | And The War Came | 2014 |
| C & C Surf Factory | Garage City | 2015 |
| Good Lovelies | Burn the Plan | 2015 |
| William Prince | Earthly Days | 2015 |
| Whitehorse | Leave No Bridge Unburned | 2015 |
| Hawksley Workman | Old Cheetah | 2015 |
| The Strumbellas | Hope | 2016 |
| Whitehorse | The Northern South Vol. 1 | 2016 |
| Danny Michel | Matadora | 2016 |
| Tanya Tagaq | Retribution | 2016 |
| Whitney Rose | South Texas Suite | 2017 |
| Amelia Curran | Watershed | 2017 |
| Sam Outlaw | Tenderheart | 2017 |
| Whitehorse | Panther in the Dollhouse | 2017 |
| Whitney Rose | Rule 62 | 2017 |
| The Deep Dark Woods | Yarrow | 2017 |
| Rheostatics | Here Come the Wolves | 2019 |
| William Prince | Reliever | 2020 |
| William Prince | Gospel First Nation | 2020 |
| Boy Golden | Church of Better Daze | 2021 |
| Whitehorse | Strike Me Down | 2021 |
| Elliott Brood | The Christmas Life | 2021 |
| Tanya Tagaq | Tongues | 2022 |
| Skye Wallace | Terribly Good | 2022 |
| Whitehorse | I'm Not Crying, You're Crying | 2023 |
| July Talk | Remember Never Before | 2023 |
| William Prince | Stand in the Joy | 2023 |

== See also ==
- List of record labels
