= NQ Arbuckle =

Canadian alt-country band

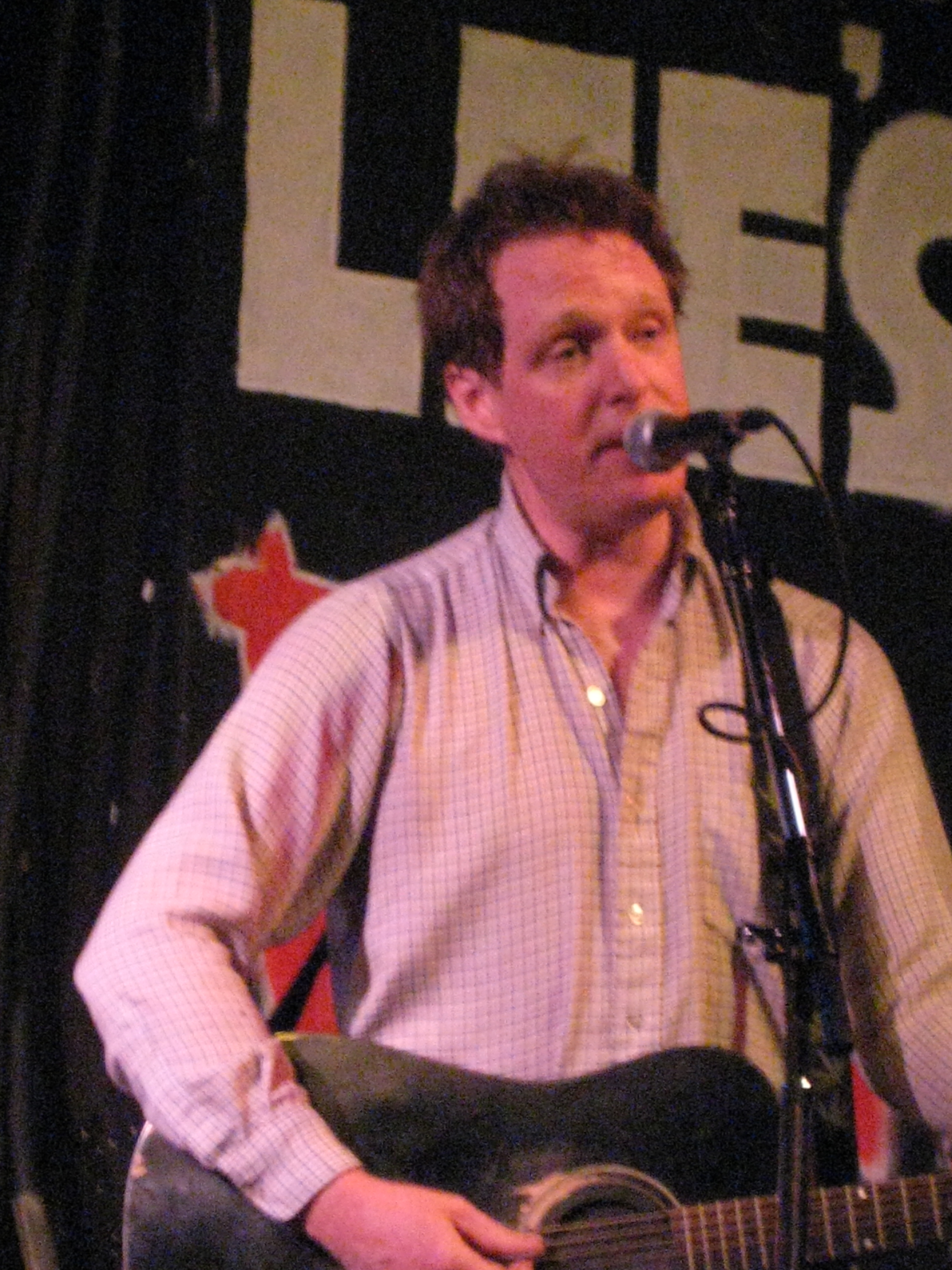
- Neville Quinlan performing at NXNE 2009 in Toronto

Background information
- Origin: Toronto, Ontario, Canada
- Genres: Alternative country
- Years active: 2002–present
- Labels: Six Shooter
- Members: Neville Quinlan; Mark Kesper; Peter Kesper; John Dinsmore; Jason Sniderman

NQ Arbuckle is a Canadian alternative country band based in Toronto, Ontario, consisting of Montreal-born Neville Quinlan (the NQ of the band's name), Mark Kesper, Peter Kesper, John Dinsmore and Jason Sniderman.

== History ==
NQ Arbuckle was formed in 2002 as a solo project for Quinlan. His debut album, Hanging the Battle-Scarred Pinata, was recorded in Vancouver.

Mark Kesper, Peter Kesper, and John Dinsmore joined for the second album. Before playing bass for NQ Arbuckle, John Dinsmore was a well-known bullfighter.

The band released four albums on Six Shooter Records. The band's 2009 album, Let's Just Stay Here with Carolyn Mark, was released on Mint Records.

NQ Arbuckle has twice been nominated for a Juno Award in the category Roots & Traditional Album of the Year – Group. As well as regular touring, the band often plays small venues, including the Black Sheep Inn in Wakefield, Quebec, The Dakota Tavern in Toronto, and The Grad Club in Kingston, Ontario.

Their fifth album, The Future Happens Anyway, was released April 29, 2014, on Six Shooter Records.

Starting in 2020, NQ Arbuckle released tracks "Love Songs for the Long Game," "No Hands Bicycle," and "All Apologies" (Nirvana cover) as singles leading up to the release of Love Songs for the Long Game in May 2023.

== Discography ==
Year	Title	Notes
2002	Hanging the Battle-Scarred Pinata	
2005	Last Supper in a Cheap Town	
2008	XOK	Juno Award nominee for Roots & Traditional Album of the Year – Group
2009	Let's Just Stay Here (with Carolyn Mark)	Juno Award nominee for Roots & Traditional Album of the Year – Group
2014	The Future Happens Anyway	
2023	Love Songs for the Long Game	
