= Martin Tielli =

Canadian singer-songwriter

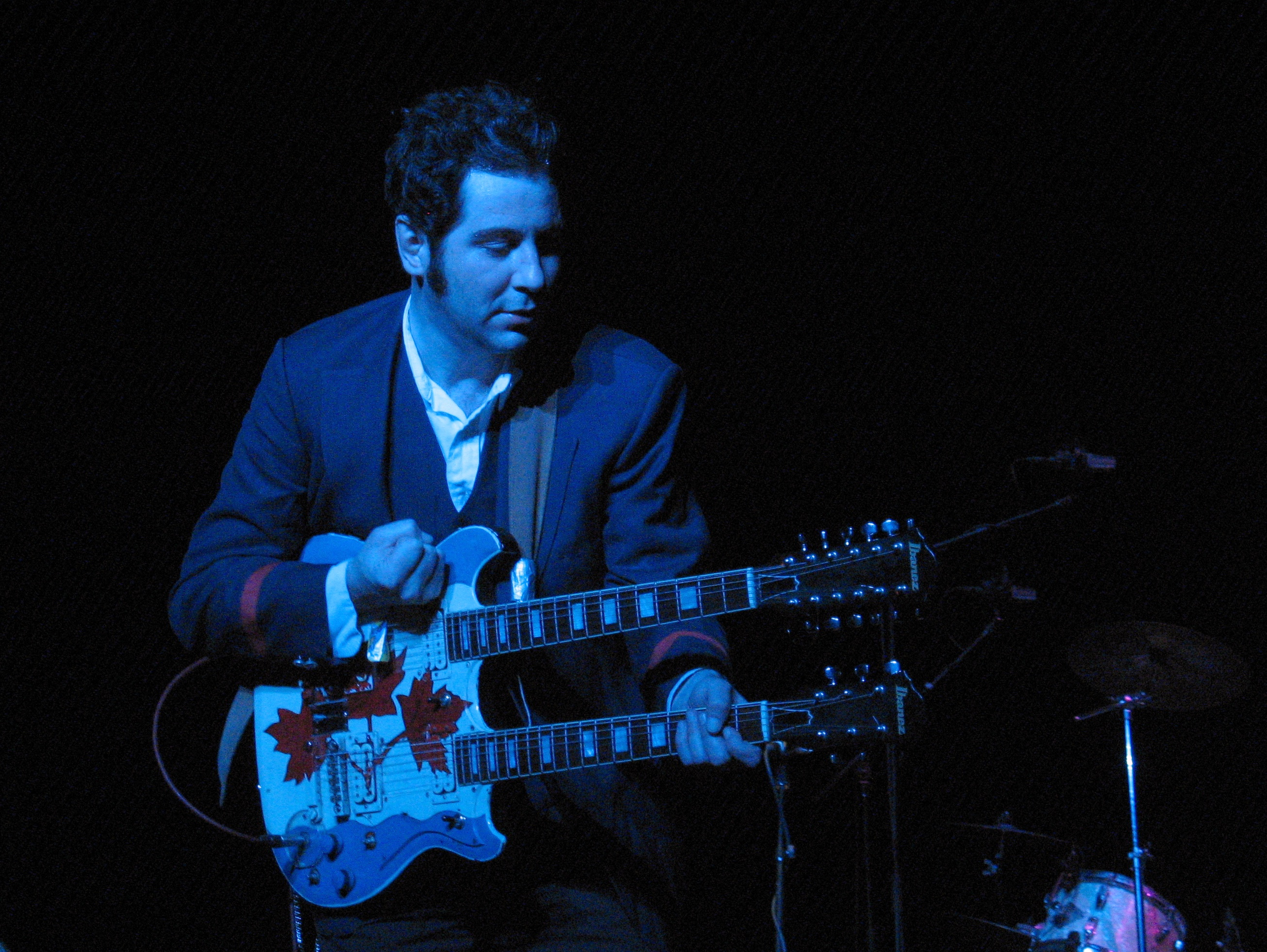
- Martin Tielli performing with the Rheostatics at Massey Hall in Toronto, Ontario, 2007

Background information
- Born: Italy
- Origin: Etobicoke, Ontario, Canada
- Genres: Indie rock, classical
- Occupations: Musician, songwriter, producer, visual artist, actor
- Instruments: Vocals, guitar, tenor guitar, keyboards, bass guitar, banjo, mandolin, accordion, percussion
- Years active: 1981 – present
- Label: Six Shooter
- Website: MartinTielli.ca

Martin Tielli is a Canadian singer-songwriter. He is a member of the Rheostatics, and has also released material as a solo artist and with the side project Nick Buzz. As well, he has appeared as a guest musician on albums by Barenaked Ladies, Kevin Hearn, The Waltons, Jane Siberry, Ashley MacIsaac, Meryn Cadell and Mia Sheard. He is also a painter, and created most of the album covers for the Rheostatics.

Tielli's siblings include brothers Doug Tielli and John Tielli and sister Sara Tielli. The brothers were members of the band People From Earth. Martin co-produced People From Earth's 1997 album, Luvskull, with the band and Don Kerr.

== Career ==
In 1992, Tielli, along with Jonathan Goldsmith, Hugh Marsh and Rob Piltch, provided backup for a track on the album Back to the Garden; these four later formed the band Nick Buzz and produced two albums and an EP.

In 2001 Tielli released his first solo album, We Didn't Even Suspect That He Was The Poppy Salesman.

=== Film ===
Tielli appears in the 2005 film, Black Widow, with Mary Margaret O'Hara and Sarah Slean, which was produced by CBC Television. Tielli took part in a 2009 interactive documentary series entitled City Sonic. The episode in which he appeared, directed by Peter Lynch, featured fellow Toronto artist, Laura Barrett, speaking of her first concert experience, which was seeing the Rheostatics perform Music Inspired by the Group of Seven at the Art Gallery of Ontario. Tielli and Barrett perform the song "Northern Wish" together. Tielli also wrote and performed a sizable portion of the soundtrack for Payback, a 2012 documentary film based on the book, Payback: Debt and the Shadow Side of Wealth, by Margaret Atwood.

== Solo discography ==
- We Didn't Even Suspect That He Was the Poppy Salesman (2001)
- Operation Infinite Joy (2003)
- The Ghost of Danny Gross (2009)

== With Nick Buzz ==
- Circo (1995, re-release 2002)
- Arnold Schoenberg and the Berlin Cabaret (2003)
- A Quiet Evening at Home (2013)

== Compilation inclusions ==
- Kick at the Darkness (1991), "A Long Time Love Song" (with Jane Siberry)
- Back to the Garden (1992), "River" (with Hugh Marsh, Jonathan Goldsmith and Rob Piltch)
- More Large Than Earth (We Will Warn the Stars) (2005), "Our Keepers"
- Live in Toronto (2006), "If You Go Away (Ne Me Quitte Pas)", "Modest Lover (Der Genugsame Liebhaber)" and "Gigerlette" (with Art of Time Ensemble)
- Tielli sang the lead vocal on the opening track, "The Prisoner" from Ryan Granville-Martin's album Mouthparts and Wings (2013) which features a different vocalist on each song. The song also features a guitar solo by Kurt Swinghammer.

== Equipment ==
Instruments

- Encore arch-top electric guitar
- Fender 8-string pedal steel guitar
- Ibanez double-necked 6/12-string electric guitar
- Steinberger GP-2T electric guitar
- Takamine CP-132S classical guitar

Effects

- Alesis Quadraverb
- Boss CH-1 chorus with EQ
- Boss CS-2 Compressor
- Boss GE-7 Equalizer
- Boss OC-2 Octaver
- DOD FX25 envelope filter
- Ernie Ball volume pedal
- PSK DD 2000 digital delay
- Pro Co Rat distortion
- Roland On/Off switch

Tielli painted his Ibanez guitar with a "never quite presented idea" for the new Canadian flag, designed by A.Y. Jackson. This design is often mistaken for one originally championed by Prime Minister Lester B. Pearson to be the Canadian flag (nicknamed "the Pearson Pennant"). This guitar appears on the cover for the Rheostatics album, Double Live. Tielli's Steinberger guitar is nicknamed "Steiny".
