= Nik Kozub =

Canadian musician

- Also known as: The Paronomasiac, Nik 7
- Genres: Rock, electronic
- Occupations: Musician, producer
- Instruments: Bass guitar, keyboard
- Label: Normals Welcome
- Formerly of: Veal; Shout Out Out Out Out

Nik Kozub is a Canadian musician. Formerly a bass guitarist for the band Veal, he was later associated with the electronic music group Shout Out Out Out Out.

Kozub also writes and records his own solo electronic music and remixes material for other artists under the name The Paronomasiac, DJs under the name Nik 7, and is a recording engineer and producer who has worked on material for a variety of artists including Cadence Weapon, Humans, and The Wet Secrets. In 2006, he appeared in Trevor Anderson's short documentary film Rock Pockets.

Nik is the co-founder, along with Shout Out Out Out Out member Jason Troock, of Edmonton-based record label Normals Welcome Records, established in 2005.

He is the son of Wilfred Kozub, a rock musician in Edmonton.
