= 2nd Canadian Folk Music Awards =

2006 Canadian music awards ceremony

- Date: December 10, 2006
- Location: Myer Horowitz Theatre, Edmonton, Alberta
- Country: Canada
- Hosted by: Gilles Garand and Connie Kaldor
- Website: folkawards.ca

The 2nd Canadian Folk Music Awards were held on December 10, 2006, at the Myer Horowitz Theatre in Edmonton, Alberta.

== Nominees and recipients ==
Recipients are listed first and highlighted in boldface.

Traditional Album	Contemporary Album
**Nicolas Boulerice et Olivier Demers - Un peu d'ci, Un peu d'ça**; James Keelaghan - A Few Simple Verses; Claude Methe - L'Amant Confesseur; Strada - Gamos; Serre l'écoute - Fortunes et Perditions	**Penny Lang - Stone & Sand & Sea & Sky**; Corb Lund - Hair in My Eyes Like a Highland Steer; Jim Byrnes - House of Refuge; Bruce Cockburn - Life Short Call Now; The Wailin' Jennys - Firecracker
Children's Album	Contemporary Singer
**Ken Whiteley - Join the Band**; Various Artists - Le petit chien de laine; Connie Kaldor - A Poodle in Paris; Rick Scott - Snooze Music; Kathy Reid-Naiman - Reaching for the Stars	**Jim Byrnes - House of Refuge**; Stephen Fearing - Yellowjacket; Bruce Cockburn - Life Short Call Now; Lennie Gallant - When We Get There; Ron Hynes - Ron Hynes
Instrumental Solo Artist	Instrumental Group
**Bruce Cockburn - Speechless**; Oliver Schroer - Camino; Joel Fafard - ...and another thing; Steve Dawson - We Belong to the Gold Coast; James Hill - A Flying Leap	**The McDades - Bloom**; Lache Cercel - Musika Konkordo; Uzume Taiko - Undula; Fig For a Kiss - Fallen Leaf; L'Anche à Deux Cordes - Musique Traditionnelle du Quebec
English Songwriter	Aboriginal Songwriter
**Stephen Fearing - Yellowjacket**; Lennie Gallant - When We Get There; Ron Hynes - Ron Hynes; Romi Mayes - Sweet Somethin' Steady; Sarah Noni Metzner - Daybreak Mourning	**Wayne Lavallee - Green Dress**; Digging Roots - seeds; Art Napoleon - Miyoskamin; Laura Vinson and Free Spirit - It Reminds Me; Don Freed - The Valley of Green and Blue
Vocal Group	Ensemble
**Madrigaia - Pleiades**; The Wailin' Jennys - Firecracker; Serre L'Écoute - Fortunes et perditions; Madviolet - Caravan; Dala - Angels & Thieves	**Mauvais Sort - Koru**; The McDades - Bloom; Bebop Cowboys - Canadian Dance Hall; Polémil Bazar - Avale Ta Montre; Tandava - Tandava
Solo Artist	World Group
**Penny Lang - Stone & Sand & Sea & Sky**; Bruce Cockburn - Life Short Call Now; Stephen Fearing - Yellowjacket; Corb Lund - Hair in My Eyes Like a Highland Steer; Harry Manx - Mantras for Madmen	**The McDades - Bloom**; Strada - Gamos; Tandava - Tandava; Silk Road Music - Journey with her Pipa; Madrigaia - Pleiades; Polémil Bazar - Avale ta Monte
New/Emerging Artist	Producer
**T. Nile - At My Table**; David Myles - Things Have Changed; Dave Carmichael - Spirit Dance; Dyad - No Pedlars or Preachers; Dala - Angels & Thieves	**Steve Dawson - House of Refuge (Jim Byrnes)**; **Mike Roth - Angels & Thieves (Dala)**; David Travers-Smith - Firecracker (The Wailin' Jennys); Stephen Fearing - Yellowjacket (Stephen Fearing); Jordy Sharp - Mantras for Madmen (Harry Manx)
Pushing the Boundaries	Young Performer
**Andrew Collins - Little Widgets**; Silk Road Music - Autumn Cloud: Journey with her Pipa; Madrigaia - Pleiades; The McDades - Bloom; Harry Manx - Mantras for Madmen	**Sarah Burnell - Sarah'ndipity**; Daniel Gervais - Endless Possibilities; Samantha Schultz - Part of Me; Tubeless Girls - Tubeless Girls; Vissia Sisters - 3 Track Demo
