= Juno Award for Roots & Traditional Album of the Year – Solo =

Canadian music award

The Juno Award for Roots & Traditional Album of the Year – Solo was presented annually at Canada's Juno Awards to honour the best album of the year in the roots and/or traditional music genres. Prior to 1996, a single award was presented for Best Roots & Traditional Album, whose winner could be a solo artist or a band; for the 1996 ceremony, the award was split for the first time into distinct awards, one for solo artists and one for groups.

Beginning with the 2016 ceremony, two new awards categories (Contemporary Roots Album of the Year and Traditional Roots Album of the Year) were introduced to "ensure two genres of music are not competing against each other in the same category".

== Winners ==
=== Best Roots & Traditional Album - Solo (1996–2002) ===
| Year | Winner(s) | Album | Nominees | Ref. |
|---|---|---|---|---|
| 1996 | Ashley MacIsaac | Hi™ How Are You Today? | Susan Crowe, This Far From Home; James Keelaghan, A Recent Future; Danielle Martineau, Autrement; Laura Smith, B'tween the Earth and My Soul | |
| 1997 | Fred Eaglesmith | drive-in movie | Daniel Koulack, Life on a String; Natalie MacMaster, No Boundaries; Murray McLauchlan, Gulliver's Taxi; Danielle Martineau, Bal Canaille | |
| 1998 | Ron Sexsmith | Other Songs | J.P. Cormier, Another Morning; Stephen Fearing, Industrial Lullaby; Mary Jane Lamond, Suas E!; Bob Snider, Words and Pictures | |
| 1999 | Willie P. Bennett | Heartstrings | Bill Bourne, Sally's Dream; Roy Forbes, Crazy Old Man; Natalie MacMaster, My Roots Are Showing; Gordie Sampson, Stones | |
| 2000 | Bruce Cockburn | Breakfast in New Orleans Dinner in Timbuktu | Mary Jane Lamond, Lan Duil; Natalie MacMaster, In My Hands; Ron Sexsmith, Whereabouts; Jesse Winchester, Gentleman of Leisure | |
| 2001 | Jenny Whiteley | Jenny Whiteley | Connie Kaldor, Love Is a Truck; Frank Leahy and Friends, Don Messer's Violin; Jane Siberry, Hush; Neil Young, Silver & Gold | |
| 2002 | David Francey | Far End of Summer | Maria Dunn, For a Song; Penny Lang, Gather Honey; Eileen McGann, Beyond the Storm; April Verch, Verchuosity | |

=== Roots & Traditional Album of the Year: Solo (2003–2015) ===
| Year | Winner(s) | Album | Nominees | Ref. |
|---|---|---|---|---|
| 2003 | Lynn Miles | Unravel | Kim Barlow, Gingerbread; Bill Bourne, Voodoo King; Kathleen Edwards, Failer; Stephen Fearing, That's How I Walk | |
| 2004 | David Francey | Skating Rink | Bruce Cockburn, You've Never Seen Everything; Susan Crowe, Book of Days; Natalie MacMaster, Blueprint; Oh Susanna, Oh Susanna | |
| 2005 | Jenny Whiteley | Hopetown | Michael Jerome Browne, Michael Jerome Browne & The Twin River String Band; David Francey, The Waking Hour; Amos Garrett, Acoustic Album; Harry Manx, West Eats Meet | |
| 2006 | Corb Lund | Hair in My Eyes Like a Highland Steer | Yves Lambert, Récidive; Harry Manx, Mantras for Madmen; Lynn Miles, Love Sweet Love; Ian Tyson, Songs from the Gravel Road | |
| 2007 | Stephen Fearing | Yellowjacket | Steve Dawson, We Belong to the Gold Coast; Fred Eaglesmith, Milly's Cafe; Lennie Gallant, When We Get There; Loreena McKennitt, An Ancient Muse | |
| 2008 | David Francey | Right of Passage | Jill Barber, For All Time; Corb Lund, Horse Soldier! Horse Soldier!; Oh Susanna, Short Stories; Justin Rutledge, The Devil on a Bench in Stanley Park | |
| 2009 | Old Man Luedecke | Proof of Love | Matthew Barber, Ghost Notes; Fred Eaglesmith, Tinderbox; Ndidi Onukwulu, The Contradictor; Suzie Vinnick, Happy Here | |
| 2010 | Amelia Curran | Hunter Hunter | Bahamas, Pink Strat; Corb Lund, Losin' Lately Gambler; Romi Mayes, Achin' in Yer Bones; John Wort Hannam, Queen's Hotel | |
| 2011 | Old Man Luedecke | My Hands Are On Fire and Other Love Songs | Del Barber, Love Songs for the Last Twenty; Lynn Miles, Fall for Beauty; Ruth Moody, The Garden; Justin Rutledge, The Early Widows | |
| 2012 | Bruce Cockburn | Small Source of Comfort | Craig Cardiff, Floods & Fires; David Francey, Late Edition; Dave Gunning, A Tribute to John Allan Cameron; Lindi Ortega, Little Red Boots | |
| 2013 | Rose Cousins | We Have Made a Spark | Annabelle Chvostek, Rise; Amelia Curran, Spectators; Corb Lund, Cabin Fever; Old Man Luedecke, Tender Is the Night | |
| 2014 | Justin Rutledge | Valleyheart | David Francey, So Say We All; Lindi Ortega, Tin Star; Daniel Romano, Come Cry With Me; Donovan Woods, Don't Get Too Grand | |
| 2015 | Catherine MacLellan | The Raven's Sun | Matt Andersen, Weightless; Del Barber, Prairieography; Amelia Curran, They Promised You Mercy; James Hill, The Old Silo | |
