= 5th Canadian Folk Music Awards =

2009 music awards ceremony

- Date: November 21, 2009
- Location: Dominion Chalmers Church Ottawa, Ontario
- Country: Canada
- Hosted by: Shelagh Rogers and Benoit Bourque
- Website: folkawards.ca

The 5th Canadian Folk Music Awards were held on November 21, 2009, at the Dominion Chalmers Church in Ottawa, Ontario.

== Nominees and recipients ==
Recipients are listed first and highlighted in boldface.

Traditional Album	Contemporary Album
**James Hill & Anne Davison – True Love Don't Weep**; Colette Cheverie – Hours Before Dawn; Dave Gossage and the Celtic Mindwarp – Dave Gossage and the Celtic Mindwarp; Réveillons – Malbrough n'est pas mort; The Haints Old Time Stringband – Shout Monah	**Joel Plaskett – Three**; Great Lake Swimmers – Lost Channels; Jim Byrnes – My Walking Stick; Ndidi Onukwulu – The Contradictor; Romi Mayes – Achin in Yer Bones
Children's Album	Traditional Singer
**Chris McKhool – FiddleFire!**; Kathy Reid-Naiman – Zoom Zoom Cuddle and Croon; Maggie G. – Around The House With Maggie G.; Tasha Platt – Big Bad Bantam Rooster; The Kerplunks – Walk On	**Colette Cheverie – Hours Before Dawn**; Dave MacDonald – Lazy Jacks – East Coast Live; Ian Bell – My Pious Friends & Drunken Companions; Monique Jutras – Le Chant de la Mariniere; Peter Wynne – Lazy Jacks – East Coast Live
Contemporary Singer	Instrumental Solo Artist
**Jim Byrnes – My Walking Stick**; Jessica Rhaye – Good Things; Marianne Girard – Pirate Days; Melissa McClelland – Victoria Day; Suzie Vinnick – Happy Here	**Tony McManus – The Maker's Mark**; Guy Donis – Paroles d'arbre; Don Alder – Not A Planet; Joel Fafard – Three Hens Escape Oblivion; Karrnnel – Karrnnel
Instrumental Group	English Songwriter
**Sultans of String – Yalla Yalla!**; De Lònga – À l'abri du temps; La Nef – Deserts; Oktoécho – Oktoécho; The Rakish Angles – The Rakish Angles	**Susan Crowe – Greytown**; Jon Brooks – Moth Nor Rust; Rob Heath – One More Day Above Ground; Rob Lutes – Truth & Fiction; William Hawkins – Various Artists – Dancing Alone: Songs by William Hawkins
French Songwriter	Aboriginal Songwriter
**Catherine Durand – Coeurs migratoires**; Guillaume Monette, Guillaume Meloche-Charlebois & Nicola Morel (3 Gars su'l sofa) – Cerf-volant; Caracol – L'Abre aux parfums; Maryse Letarte – Des pas dans la neige; Paul Cargnello – Bras coupé	**Don Amero - Deepening**; Buffy Sainte-Marie – Running for the Drum; Vince Fontaine, Jay Bodner and Chris Burke-Gaffney (Eagle & Hawk) – Sirensong; Tanya Tagaq - Auk/Blood; Violet Naytowhow – Wind of the North
Vocal Group	Ensemble
**Madison Violet – No Fool For Trying**; Cantarra – Beautiful Air; Dala – Everyone Is Someone; Serre L'Ecoute – Buveurs Philosophes; The Breakmen – When You Leave Town	**The Deep Dark Woods – Winter Hours**; Annie Lou – Annie Lou; Oktoécho – Oktoécho; Sultans of String – Yalla Yalla!; The Haints Old Time Stringband – Shout Monah
Solo Artist	World Solo Artist
**Catherine MacLellan – Water in the Ground**; Ian Tyson – Yellowhead to Yellowstone and Other Love Stories; Joel Plaskett – Three; Maria Dunn – The Peddler; Suzie Vinnick – Happy Here	**Karim Saada – La Danse de L'exilé**; Florent Vollant – Eku Mamu; George Koufogiannakis – Generations – Greek Oud Jazz; Lorraine Klaasen – Africa Calling; Wesli – Kouraj
World Group	New/Emerging Artist
**Jayme Stone & Mansa Sissoko – Africa to Appalachia**; Ensemble Montréal Tango – Enamorada; La Nef – Deserts; Oktoécho – Oktoécho; The Huppa Project – Under the Canopy	**The Good Lovelies – Good Lovelies**; David Baxter – Day & Age; Kate Reid – I'm Just Warming Up; Lynne Hanson – Eleven Months; The Breakmen – When You Leave Town
Producer	Pushing the Boundaries
**Joel Plaskett - Joel Plaskett – Three**; Jocelyn Tellier & Catherine Durand - Catherine Durand – Coeurs Migratoires; Mike Roth - Dala – Everyone Is Someone; David Travers-Smith - Jayme Stone & Mansa Sissoko – Africa to Appalachia; Jonathan Goldsmith - Jenn Grant – Echos	**Steve Dawson – Telescope**; Doug Cox et Salil Bhatt – Slide to Freedom 2 – Make a Better World; Joel Plaskett – Three; Sultans of String – Yalla Yalla!; Wendy McNeill – A Dreamer's Guide to Hardcore Living
Young Performer	
**Ariana Gillis – To Make It Make Sense**; Chrissy Crowley – The Departure; Qristina & Quinn Bachand – Relative Minors; Sierra Noble – Possibilities; Taylor Mitchell – For Your Consideration	
