= My Dear Little Angle =

Studio album by The Smalls
- Released: April 1999
- Recorded: November 1998
- Genre: Rock
- Label: Smallsong
- Producer: Glenn Robinson

The Smalls chronology
Waste and Tragedy (1995)	My Dear Little Angle (1999)

Professional ratings
Review scores
Source	Rating
Exclaim!	(favourable)
Jam!	(favourable)

My Dear Little Angle is the fourth album released by Canadian rock quartet The Smalls. The album was released April 1999 on Smallsong Recordings, distributed by Outside Music. It was recorded November 1998 at Greenhouse Studios in Vancouver with producer Glenn Robinson and mastered by Howie Weinberg at Masterdisk in New York. The album peaked at #10 in the Chart weekly Top 50 Canadian albums list and was #68 in the Chart Top 100 Albums of 1999 list.

The recording of the album was the subject of a documentary entitled The Smalls... Er Whatever, directed by John Stiles and edited by Ian Harvey. The documentary was featured at the Local Heroes International Film Festival and was aired on MuchMusic.

The album's fourth track, "My Saddle Horse Has Died", was released by Corb Lund and the Hurtin' Albertans in 2007 on their album Horse Soldier! Horse Soldier!

== Track listing ==
1. "My Dear Little Angle"
2. "Murdering Me"
3. "Domination"
4. "My Saddle Horse Has Died"
5. "Chords Like This (I Usually Don't Strum My)"
6. "VCR"
7. "Fistful of Powder"
8. "Legba's Cux"
9. "Alvarez"
10. "Natural Woman"
11. "PIN"
12. "Tell Us About It"
13. "What I Need to Carry On"
14. "Ride On Through (My Saddle Horse Has Died)"

== Personnel ==
- Mike Caldwell – vocals
- Corb Lund – bass
- Dug Bevans – lead guitar
- Terry Johnson – drums
