= Myshkin (album) =

Studio album by Michou
- Released: June 5, 2008
- Genre: Folk; Indie
- Length: 34:15
- Producer: Joel Bruyere

Professional ratings
Review scores
Source	Rating
Windsor Star	5/5 stars

Myshkin (2008) is the debut full-length album by Michou. As was their first EP, Myshkin was recorded in the attic of friend Joel Bruyere, mastered by Noah Mintz at Lacquer Channel and released on June 5, 2008.

The album is named after the protagonist, Prince Lev Nikolaevich Myshkin, in the novel 'The Idiot' by Fyodor Dostoevsky. The band said they named it Myshkin because they "felt the character really reflected who [we] are as a band."

It is also stated by former member Ryan Ard in the album's liner notes that "Myshkin represents the simplicity and honesty conveyed through our music as well as our naive goal to make it in this industry, but more specifically in a world we know little about."

Elements of twee, filtered mainstream pop and Dylanesque brood ebb and flow through the tracks, creating an incisive listen, one that like all good albums, reveals more with each listen.

— Shain Shapiro, The View

A music video for 'Control' by Suede Productions in Windsor starring Ryan Ard's sister Alicia was released on August 14, 2008. It premiered one week later on MuchMusic August 21, 2008, and has since been in regular rotation.

== Track listing ==
1. "Medea" – 4:13
2. "Rocks in the Dryer" – 3:24
3. "In Passing" – 4:09
4. "Control" – 4:45
5. "From Friends To Lovers" – 3:38
6. "Imperfect" – 2:44
7. "Only Half Conscious" – 2:54
8. "The Moon and the Sun" – 3:35
9. "The Anti-Hero Makes His Way" – 4:57
