= Strange Boy =

Strange Boy may refer to:

- "Strange Boy", a song by Dala from the album This Moment Is a Flash
- Strange Boy, an album by Kate Davis
- "A Strange Boy", a song by Joni Mitchell from the album Hejira

== See also ==
- The Strange Boys, American rock band
