= Borrowed Tunes II: A Tribute to Neil Young =

2007 compilation album by various artists

Compilation album by Various Artists
- Released: November 6, 2007
- Genres: Folk rock, various
- Producer: Various

Professional ratings
Review scores
Source	Rating
Allmusic	(Not Reviewed) link

Borrowed Tunes II is a tribute album to Neil Young, released October 16, 2007. The album features a variety of Canadian musicians covering songs written by Neil Young. All proceeds from album sales will benefit two not-for-profit organizations selected by Neil Young: The Bridge School and Toronto-based Safehaven.

== Track listing ==
=== Disc 1 ===
1. 54-40, "Borrowed Tune"
2. Jets Overhead, "Mr. Soul"
3. Dala, "Ohio (Medley)"
4. Barenaked Ladies, "Wonderin'"
5. City and Colour, "Cowgirl In the Sand"
6. Harpoondodger & Pat Robitaille, "Sugar Mountain"
7. Great Lake Swimmers, "Don't Cry No Tears"
8. Danny Michel, "After the Goldrush"
9. Finger Eleven, "Walk On"
10. Andre, "Alabama"
11. Tom Cochrane, "Old Man"
12. Tom Wilson, "Expecting to Fly"
13. Chantal Kreviazuk, "A Man Needs a Maid"
14. Alana Levandoski, "Don't Be Denied"
15. Ron Sexsmith, "Philadelphia"
16. Dave Gunning, "A Dream That Can Last"
17. Melissa McClelland, "Cinnamon Girl"
18. Liam Titcomb, "Bandit"
19. Kyle Riabko, "Helpless"

=== Disc 2 ===
1. Neverending White Lights, "Change Your Mind"
2. Raine Maida, "Don't Let It Bring You Down"
3. Jeremy Fisher, "Harvest
4. The Trews, "Come On Baby Let's Go Downtown"
5. Jorane, "Needle and the Damage Done"
6. Grimskunk, "Rockin' In the Free World"
7. Matt Mays, "Sample and Hold"
8. Astrid Young, "Sleeps With Angels"
9. Attack in Black, "A Man Needs a Maid"
10. Blackie & The Rodeo Kings, "Unknown Legend"
11. Adrienne Pierce, "Pocahontas"
12. Joel Kroeker, "When God Made Me"
13. The Saint Alvia Cartel, "Thrasher"
14. Justin Nozuka, "Bad Fog of Loneliness"
15. Cuff the Duke, "Words (Between the Lines of Age)"
16. Tara MacLean, "Natural Beauty"
17. George Canyon, "Harvest Moon"
18. Chris Seldon, "Long May You Run"
