= Thirtysomething (disambiguation) =

Thirtysomething is an American television series.

Thirtysomething or 30-something may also refer to:

- Thirty Something (Taiwanese TV series), a Taiwanese television series
- Thirtysomething (age), a term of approximation denoting one who is, or who is believed to be, in one's thirties

== See also ==
- 30 Something, an album by Carter the Unstoppable Sex Machine
- 30 Something (Orbital album), a 2022 greatest hits album by Orbital
- "30 Something" (Black-ish), a 2015 television episode
- Twentysomething (disambiguation)
