= Best Day =

Studio album by Dala
- Released: May 29, 2012 (US); June 5, 2012 (CA)
- Recorded: 2012
- Genres: Folk, Rock, Acoustic
- Length: 36:50
- Label: Campus Music/Lenz Entertainment
- Producer: Mike Roth

Dala chronology
| Everyone Is Someone (2009) | Best Day (2012) |

Best Day is the fifth studio album by Canadian band Dala. It was released on May 29, 2012 in the US and June 5, 2012 in Canada.

== Reception ==
Best Day was released to critical acclaim. It earned three Canadian Folk Music Award nominations for English Songwriter of the Year, Vocal Group of the Year, and Producer of the Year, and was listed at #24 on Muruch's Top 25 Albums of 2012

== Track listing ==
All tracks are written by Sheila Carabine, Amanda Walther and Mike Roth, except where noted.

| No. | Title | Length |
|---|---|---|
| 1. | "Life on Earth" | 3:56 |
| 2. | "Best Day" | 1:58 |
| 3. | "Not Alone" (Carabine) | 3:32 |
| 4. | "Lennon and McCartney" | 2:59 |
| 5. | "Good as Gold" (Carabine/Walther) | 3:55 |
| 6. | "The Great Escape" | 3:33 |
| 7. | "Father" (Walther) | 2:51 |
| 8. | "Virginia Woolf" | 3:39 |
| 9. | "Peggy" (Carabine) | 3:05 |
| 10. | "First Love" (Walther) | 3:03 |
| 11. | "Still Life" (Carabine/Roth) | 3:06 |
| 12. | "Too Many Kittens" (hidden track) | 1:13 |

== Personnel ==
- Sheila Carabine – vocals, acoustic guitars, ukulele, piano
- Amanda Walther – vocals, acoustic guitars, piano
- Mike Roth – producer
- Dan Roth – bass (track 1, 11), electric guitar (track 11)
- Gary Craig – drums (track 1, 6, 8)
- Doug Cameron – steel guitar (track 1,8), banjo track 1), mandolin (track 1, 8)
- Chris Bilton – string arrangement (track 1, 6), piano (track 1, 3), keyboards(track 1, 3, 6)
- Kevin Fox – cello (track 2, 4, 5, 7)
- Asher Lenz – string arrangement and keyboards (track 2)
- Vince Gassi – trumpet (track 4)
- Adrian Walther – bass (track 6, 8, 10)
- Adrian Vanelli – drums (track 10)

== Use in media ==
Good as Gold is featured in the Canadian science fiction television series Continuum episode 2.3, Second Thoughts.
