= Modern Pain =

Studio album by Corb Lund and the Hurtin' Albertans
- Released: 1995
- Genre: Roots/Country/Blues
- Length: 49:49
- Label: Outside Music
- Producer: Trevor Rockwell

Corb Lund and the Hurtin' Albertans chronology
Modern Pain (1995)	Unforgiving Mistress (1999)

Modern Pain is the debut album by Canadian country singer Corb Lund. Originally released in 1995, the album was re-released in 2003 after Lund's commercial breakthrough with the album Five Dollar Bill in 2002.

== Track listing ==
1. Expectation and the Blues - 2:55
2. We Used to Ride 'em - 2:58
3. Untitled Waltz - 3:28
4. Your Game Again - 2:44
5. Owlsong - 2:10
6. La Souffrance des Gens - 3:11
7. Lament for Lester Cousins - 3:50
8. Lives of Attrition (The Best We Can Do) - 3:07
9. You and Your Creeping - 4:00
10. Heavy and Leaving - 3:19
11. Waste and Tragedy† - 3:28
12. Manyberries† - 2:41
13. Evil in Me† - 2:30
14. Hockey Song (live)† - 3:03
15. Sixteen Tons (live)† - 2:48
16. Are You Sure Hank Done It This Way (live)† - 3:25

†:Only on 2003 release
