= Chris McKhool =

Canadian musician

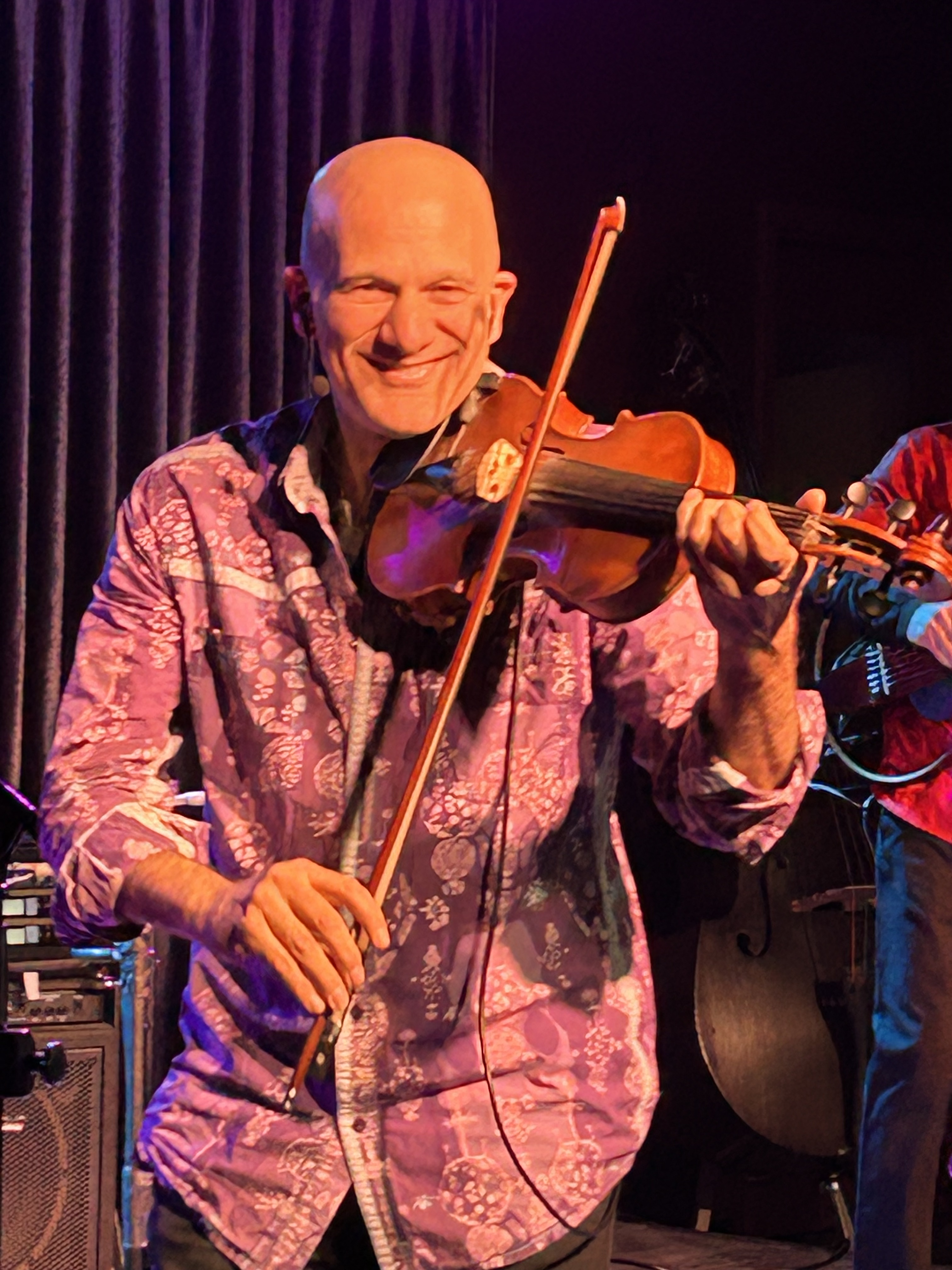

Background information
- Born: Chris McKhool; November 18, 1968 (age 57); Ottawa, Ontario, Canada
- Genres: Folk; Jazz; Classical; instrumental; world
- Occupations: musician; singer; songwriter; producer
- Instruments: vocals; guitar; violin; mandolin
- Years active: 1986–present
- Labels: Fontana North; Chris McKhool
- Member of: Sultans of String
- Website: fiddlefire.com; sultansofstring.com

Chris McKhool is a Canadian violinist, guitarist, composer, producer, filmmaker, and educator. As the leader and producer of the Canadian band Sultans of String, McKhool has built a career centred on fusing folk, jazz, and global musical traditions including Arabic and Flamenco styles. McKhool received the Queen’s Diamond Jubilee Medal in 2012, and in 2025 received the key to the city from Burlington’s mayor Marianne Meed Ward. His productions have received five JUNO Award nominations and seven Canadian Folk Music Awards. McKhool's work encompasses music, film, and education, with recurring themes of inclusion, environmental stewardship, and Indigenous reconciliation.

== Early life and education ==
Born in Ottawa, Ontario, to a Lebanese father and a Lebanese mother who was born in Egypt, (his family name originally pronounced “Makhoul” in Kfirmishki, Lebanon), McKhool began studying violin at age seven and studied classical violin under Joan Milkson of the National Arts Centre Orchestra from 1977 to 1985. He also performed with the National Capital String Academy and learned folk guitar independently, learning from friends and other musicians. He attended Fisher Park High School on Holland Avenue in Ottawa. In 1987 he moved to Montreal to study at McGill University, obtaining a B.A. in psychology. McKhool moved to Toronto in 1993, studying jazz at York University.

== Personal life ==
McKhool resides with his wife and daughter in Burlington, Ontario. He has received the 2025 Key to the City of Burlington, the 2022 Burlington’s Best Local Musician/Band designation, and a 2024 Burlington Performing Arts Centre Hall of Fame induction

== Career ==
=== Sultans of String ===
In 2004, McKhool co-founded Sultans of String in Toronto with guitarist Kevin Laliberté and bass guitarist Drew Birston, releasing nine albums and winning multiple awards. Other band members have included Rosendo 'Chendy' Leon, Saskia Tomkins and other special guests. The band incorporates Middle Eastern, Latin, European, and North American musical traditions. McKhool serves as the band’s violinist, composer, and producer. The Sultans of String discography spans multiple genres and cultural influences. Their debut album Luna (2007) was nominated for a Canadian Folk Music Award, while Yalla Yalla! (2009) earned a JUNO Award nomination for World Music Album of the Year and a Canadian Folk Music Award for Instrumental Group of the Year.

In 2015 McKhool produced the Sultans of String's 5th album with JUNO Award-winning engineer John "Beetle" Bailey, entitled Subcontinental Drift. This album was made in collaboration with sitarist Anwar Khurshid; in 2016 the band toured across Canada, the United States and the UK with this formation, showcasing their collaboration. This album reached the Billboard World Music charts in 2017. Subcontinental Drift also received a JUNO Award nomination in the World Music category as well as their 3rd Canadian Folk Music Award for World Group of the year. Their following albums albums Refuge (2020) and Sanctuary (2021) addressed immigration and displacement, and inspired their UNHCR involvement.

In 2017 McKhool and Bailey co-produced a world music Christmas album with Sultans of String entitled Christmas Caravan. They toured across North America in support of the album, which was included in the New York Times Holiday Hits section and Spotify's Holiday Albums Hit List, as well as hitting the Billboard World Music charts at #6. Special guests included Richard Bona, Paddy Moloney (The Chieftains), Nikki Yanofsky, Ruben Blades, Sweet Honey in the Rock, Alex Cuba, as well as the City of Prague Philharmonic Orchestra. His song "Sing For Kwanzaa" with collaborator Richard Bona won the 2017 Folk Music Ontario: Songs From The Heart Award and the 2017 ISC International Songwriting Competition: World category

His 2023 album, Walking Through the Fire, released on September 15, 2023, was recorded in collaboration with Indigenous artists including Northern Cree, The North Sound, Shannon Thunderbird, and Dr. Duke Redbird, in response to the Truth and Reconciliation Commission’s Call to Action #83. The album features lyrics in Dene, Inuktitut, Sm’algyax, Cree, and Michif. As recognition of this project, McKhool was awarded the Dr. Duke Redbird Lifetime Achievement Award, and the Merilaïnen Music Awards as Indigenous Ally of the Year

Chris McKhool and Sultans of String are fundraising partners with the "UNHCR".

=== Music Production ===
In his role as music producer with Sultans of String, McKhool has won Producer of the Year along with co-producer and engineer John 'Beetle’ Bailey in the 2023 Canadian Folk Music Awards with the CD entitled Sanctuary , and Producer of the Year in the 2021 Canadian Folk Music Awards and 2020 Independent Music Awards for Refuge. McKhool was also nominated as Producer of the Year in 2012 in the Canadian Folk Music Awards, and again in 2018 with Christmas Caravan. He won the 2014 IMA Independent Music Vox Pop Award for Music Producer with Symphony!

Two Sultans of String tracks were also part of John Bailey’s Engineer of the Year nominations at the JUNOs, including in 2021 "The Grand Bazaar (featuring Bela Fleck and Robi Botos)" from the Refuge album, and a 2022 nomination with "Mi Santuario” (featuring Juan Carlos Medrano) from the album Sanctuary

His most recent album for children “Little Leaf” was released in November 2025 and is nominated for a 2026 JUNO Award in the Children’s Album of the Year category.

=== Film Production ===
McKhool has also worked as a filmmaker, writing, directing, and producing visual albums. His 2025 film production, Walking Through the Fire - Visual Album accompanying the music release features performances by Indigenous collaborators. His film production The Refuge Project – Visual Album (2020), mixed in Dolby Atmos, addresses displacement and inclusion, showcasing global artists including Ahmed Moneka (Iraq), Amir Amiri (Iran), and Syrian refugees Majd Sukar and Leen Hamo.

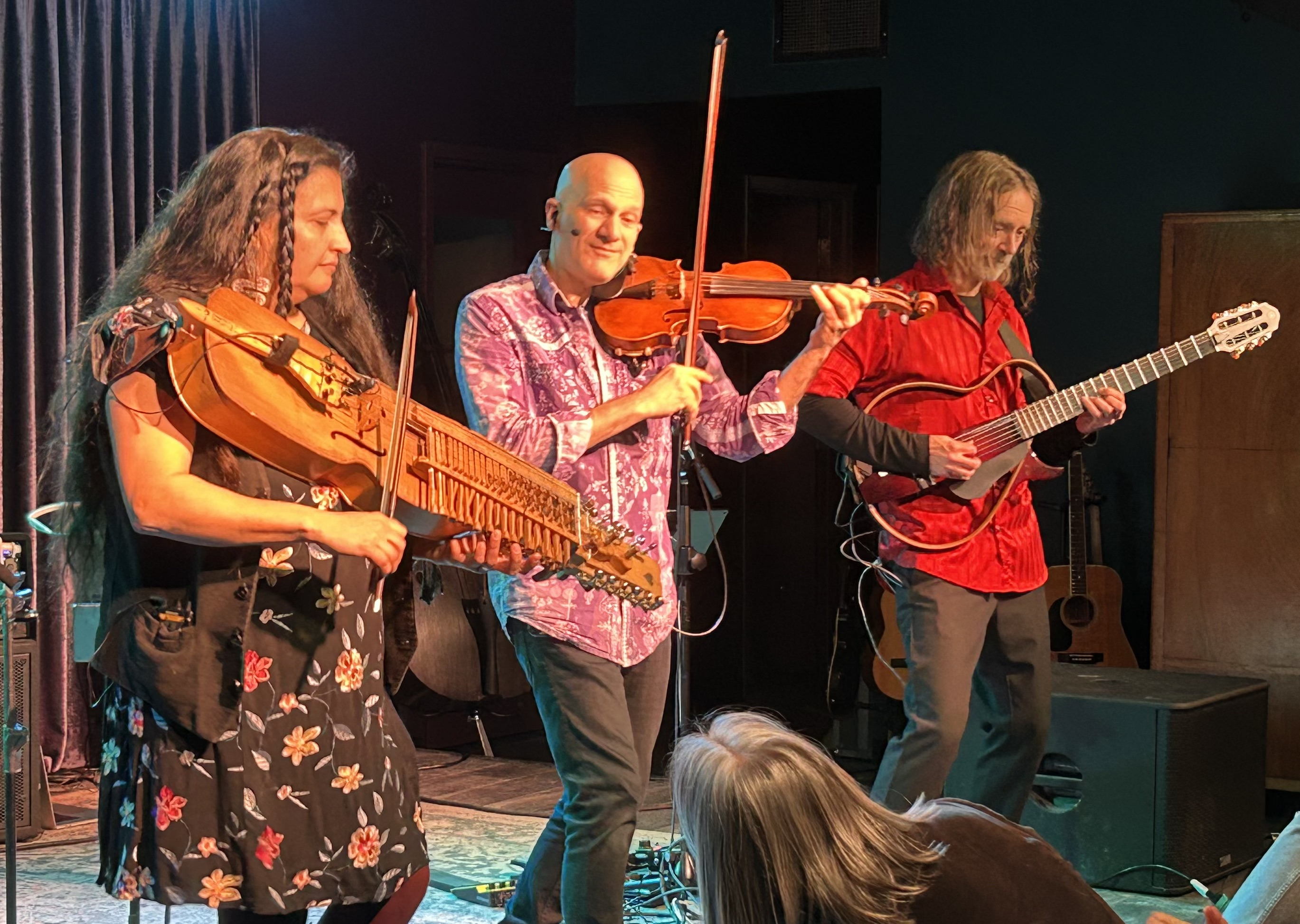
Chris McKhool with Saskia Tomkins (playing a nyckelharpa) and Kevin Laliberté at Red Bird Live, Ottawa, Ontario, March 22, 2026.

=== Tours and Performances ===
McKhool has performed as a solo artist and with Sultans of String at venues and festivals including Canada’s National Arts Centre, Toronto’s Four Seasons Centre, Koerner Hall, and JUNOfest, as well as abroad at New York’s Birdland Jazz Club, Celtic Connections Festival in Glasgow, Scotland, Folk Alliance in Memphis, Tennessee, and official Canada Day celebrations at London, UK’s Trafalgar Square.

His compositions have been performed with the Annapolis Symphony Orchestra, Buffalo Philharmonic, and the Bangor Symphony in the US, as well as with many Canadian symphonies.

McKhool has also performed for young audiences. His 2008 children's album Fiddlefire! won the Canadian Folk Music Award for Children's Album of the Year, and was nominated for a JUNO Award.

== Discography ==
- Little Leaf - Chris McKhool (2025)
- Walking Through the Fire – Sultans of String (2023)
- Sanctuary – Sultans of String (2021)
- Refuge – Sultans of String (2020)
- Christmas Caravan – Sultans of String (2017)
- Subcontinental Drift – Sultans of String (2015)
- Symphony – Sultans of String (2013)
- MOVE – Sultans of String (2011)
- Yalla Yalla – Sultans of String (2009)
- Fiddlefire! - Chris McKhool (2025)
- Luna – Sultans of String (2025)
- Celebrate! Holidays of the Global Village - Chris McKhool (2005)
- Earth, Seas and Air - Chris McKhool (1996)

== Awards and nominations ==
- 2026 JUNO Awards: nominee for Children's Album of the Year for "Little Leaf"
- 2025 Burlington Key to the City
- 2025 Canadian Folk Music Awards: nonimee for Ensemble of the Year
- 2025 Festivals & Events Ontario: winner Performer of The Year
- 2025 Festivals & Events Ontario: winner Innovation Award
- 2024 Cannes World Film Festival: winner Best Musical Film
- 2024 Cannes World Film Festival: winner Best Soundtrack
- 2024 Folk Music Ontario: nominee for Performing Artist of the Year
- 2024 Burlington Performing Arts Centre: Hall of Fame and Lifetime Achievement Award winner
- 2024 Merilaïnen Music Awards: Indigenous Ally of the Year winner
- 2023 International Songwriting Competition: finalist with Black Winged Raven, The Rez, and Nîmihito
- 2023 Canadian Folk Music Awards: Global Roots Album of the Year with Sanctuary
- 2023 Canadian Folk Music Awards: Producer of the Year with Sanctuary
- 2023 Canadian Folk Music Awards: nominee for Pushing the Boundaries
- 2023 Canadian Folk Music Awards: nominee for Contemporary Album
- 2022 Dr. Duke Redbird Lifetime Achievement Award: JAYU Arts For Human Rights
- 2022 Folk Music Ontario: winner Song of the Year for "Mi Santuario"
- 2022 Folk Music Ontario: nominee for Performer of the Year
- 2022 Cannes World Film Festival: winner Best Musical Film
- 2022 Burlington's Best Local Musician
- 2021 Canadian Folk Music Awards: winner (with co-producer John 'Beetle' Bailey) for Producer of the Year with Refuge
- 2021 Canadian Folk Music Awards: nominee for Ensemble of the Year for "Refuge"
- 2021 International Songwriting Competition: winner World Music for "Mi Santuario"
- 2020 Folk Music Ontario-Songwriting Award: Instrumental - "Refuge"
- 2020 Folk Music Ontario-Songwriting Award: Political - "I Am a Refugee"
- 2020 Independent Music Award: Instrumental Song of the Year -"The Grand Bazaar"
- 2020 Independent Music Award: World Music Producer of the Year for "Refuge"
- 2020 International Songwriting Competition: Instrumental
- 2020 International Songwriting Competition: World
- 2019 International Songwriting Competition: Folk semi-finals "Power of the Land"
- 2019 International Songwriting Competition: performance semi-finals "Power of the Land"
- 2018 Canadian Folk Music Awards: Producer of the Year nomination for McKhool
- 2017 New York Times Hits List with Christmas Caravan
- 2017 Billboard World Music Charts: Christmas Caravan CD hits #6
- 2017 Canadian Nielsen World Music Charts: Christmas Caravan CD hits #3
- 2017 Folk Music Ontario: Songs From The Heart Award for "Sing For Kwanzaa" from Christmas Caravan
- 2017 Folk Music Ontario: Songs From The Heart Award for "Road to Kfarmishki"
- 2017 ISC International Songwriting Competition: World category for "Sing For Kwanzaa"
- 2017 JUNO Awards: Nominees for "World Music Album of the Year" for Subcontinental Drift
- 2017 Billboard World Music Charts: Subcontinental Drift CD hits #15
- 2016 Canadian Folk Music Awards: World Music Group of the Year
- 2016 Global Music Awards: World Music/Beats
- 2015 International Songwriting Competition (ISC) for "Ho Jamalo"
- 2015 JUNO Awards: Nominees for "Instrumental Album of the Year" for Symphony!
- 2015 Toronto Independent Music Award: World Music
- 2014 SIRIUSXM Independent Music Awards Winner: World Group of the Year
- 2014 IMA Independent Music Award Winner: Instrumental Song for "Josie"
- 2014 IMA Independent Music Vox Pop Award: Music Producer (Chris McKhool) for Symphony!
- 2013 ISC International Songwriting Competition: Instrumental category for "Monti's Revenge"
- 2013 Folk Music Ontario: Songs From The Heart Award for "Monti's Revenge"
- 2013 Festivals & Events: Performer of The Year
- 2013 Queen's Diamond Jubilee Medal for bandleader Chris McKhool
- 2013 SiriusXM Canadian Indie Awards: Nominee for World Group of the Year
- 2012 Canadian Folk Music Awards: World Music Group of the Year
- 2012 Canadian Folk Music Awards: nominees for Instrumental Group & Pushing the Boundaries
- 2012 Canadian Folk Music Awards: nominee for Producer of the Year (Chris McKhool)
- 2012 Folk Music Ontario: Songs From the Heart
- 2012 Festivals & Events: Entertainer of The Year
- 2011 Ontario Contact: Artist of the Year
- 2011 International Acoustic Music Awards: Finalist for Instrumental
- 2011 Independent Music Awards: 2× Finalist for Instrumental Album & World Beat Album (Yalla Yalla!)
- 2011 ISC International Songwriting Competition: 2× Finalist for Instrumental & World Music
- 2010 JUNO Awards: Nominees for "Instrumental Album of the Year" (Yalla Yalla!)
- 2010 Canadian Independent Music Awards: nominees for Favourite World Artist/Group
- 2009 International Songwriting Competition (ISC): First Place Winners for Instrumental
- 2009 Canadian Folk Music Awards: triple nominee winning Instrumental Group of the Year (also nominated for Ensemble of the Year and Pushing the Boundaries)
- 2009 Toronto Exclusive Magazine Awards: 2× Winner for Best Toronto World CD & Artist of the Year
- 2008 International Songwriting Competition(ISC): Winner - Instrumental
- 2008 Festivals & Events Ontario: Best Variety Act
- 2008 Canadian Independent Music Awards: Finalists for Favourite World Music Band
- 2008 International Independent Music Awards: Finalists for Best World Fusion Song
- 2007 Musique du Monde Award
- 2007 Canadian Folk Music Awards: nominees for Best Instrumentalist Group
- 2007 Ontario Independent Music Awards: Best Song & Best Instrumental
- 2007 Toronto Independent Music Awards: nominees for World Music Category
- 2006 Ontario Council of Folk Festivals - Songs of the Heart Competition Finalist
- 2006 Parents' Choice Award for CD Celebrate! Holidays of the Global Village
- 2005 Green Toronto Award of Excellence for Earth, Seas & Air Children's Concert
- 2004 National Jazz Awards nomination (with Club Django, Trad. Jazz)
- 2004 CIUT-FM Award for Outstanding Musical Accompanist (violin)
- 1996 Parents' Choice Award for CD Earth, Seas & Air

McKhool's 2008 children's album Fiddlefire! has been nominated for numerous awards, including:

- 2009 JUNO Award nominee with Fiddlefire!
- 2009 Canadian Folk Music Awards - Children's Album of the Year with Fiddlefire!
- 2009 Parents' Choice Award with Fiddlefire!
- 2009 iParenting Media Award with Fiddlefire!
- 2009 Canadian Children's Book Centre 'Best of 2009' with Fiddlefire!

For a list of awards with Sultans of String, see main article: Sultans of String
