= Oktoécho =

Oktoécho is a Canadian musical collective, which blends Indigenous Canadian music with various world music genres. They are most noted for their 2022 album Transcestral, for which they won the Canadian Folk Music Award for Pushing the Boundaries at the 18th Canadian Folk Music Awards in 2023.

People who have been associated with the collective have included Norman Achneepineskum, Carla Antoun, Joséphine Bacon, Anouar Barrada, Didem Başar, Jérôme Beaulieu, Valérie Belzile, Ziad Chbat, Moe Clark, Cédric Dind-Lavoie, Michel Rakuman Dubeau, Lydia Etok, Joseph Khoury, Étienne Lafrance, Katia Makdissi-Warren, Mohamed Masmoudi, Nuné Melik, Bejana Milinov, Kristin Molnar, Khalil Moqadem, Eya-Hey Nakoda, Mohamed Raky, Bertil Schulrabe, Nina Segalowitz, Nizar Tabcharani, Amina Tebini, Marianne Trudel, and Eryk Warren.

They previously received three CFMA nominations at the 5th Canadian Folk Music Awards in 2009 for their self-titled debut album, in the categories of Ensemble of the Year, Instrumental Group of the Year and World Group of the Year.

== Discography ==
- Oktoécho - 2009
- La 5e Route Bleue - 2010
- Saimaniq - 2018
- Transcestral - 2022
