= This Moment Is a Flash =

Studio album by Dala
- Released: April 3, 2005
- Recorded: 2005
- Genre: Folk, rock, acoustic
- Length: 37:55
- Label: Big Bold Sun Music
- Producer: Mike Roth

Dala chronology
This Moment Is a Flash (2005)	Angels & Thieves (2005)

This Moment Is a Flash is the first studio album by Canadian band Dala. It was released on April 3, 2005 via indie label Big Bold Sun Music. Upon signing with Universal Music Canada, Drive Through Summer and the duo's cover of Donovan's Catch the Wind were carried over to their major label debut, Angels & Thieves, released the following November.

== Track listing ==
All tracks are written by Sheila Carabine and Amanda Walther, except where noted.

No.	Title	Length
1.	"Drive Through Summer"	3:32
2.	"Catch the Wind" (Donovan Leitch)	3:27
3.	"Butterfly to Wasp"	4:16
4.	"Go Home Alone"	3:52
5.	"Count to Ten"	3:44
6.	"Strange Boy"	4:24
7.	"This Girl"	4:06
8.	"Fall Between"	3:58
9.	"Patience"	3:35
10.	"Fortress"	3:01

== Personnel ==
- Sheila Carabine - vocals, guitar, piano, keyboards
- Amanda Walther - vocals, guitar, piano, keyboards, ukulele, harmonica
- Mike Roth - guitar, keyboards, producer, engineer
- Adrian Vanelli - drums, percussion
- Andrew Rozalowsky - bass
- Dan Roth - electric guitar
- Tawgs Salter - electric guitar, bass, drums, co-producer, mixer (tk 1)
- Tim Walther - tambourine

== In popular culture ==
- Fortress is featured in both the series premiere and finale of the Canadian police drama Flashpoint.
- Butterfly to Wasp is featured in the Canadian television program ReGenesis episode 2.7, Talk to Him.
