= Danielle Martineau =

Canadian folk musician

Danielle Martineau is a Canadian folk musician from Quebec, who has been associated with the bands Joséphine, Rockabayou, and Les Crapaudes. She is most noted as a three-time Juno Award nominee, receiving nods for Roots & Traditional Album of the Year – Solo at the Juno Awards of 1996 for Autrement and at the Juno Awards of 1997 for Bal Canaille, and for Children's Album of the Year at the Juno Awards of 1999 for Accordélidon.

== Discography ==
- Rockabayou - 1992
- Autrement - 1994
- Bal Canaille - 1996
- Accordélidon - 1998
- Les Secrets du vent - 2004
