= The Smalls =

Canadian hard rock/metal band

- Origin: Edmonton, Alberta, Canada
- Genres: Heavy metal, hardcore punk
- Years active: 1989–2001, 2014
- Labels: Cargo; Outside Music
- Past members: Mike Caldwell; Corb Lund; Dug Bevans; Terry Johnson
- Website: thesmalls.ca

The Smalls are a Canadian hard rock/metal band formed in 1989 in Edmonton, Alberta, Canada. They were influenced by jazz, hardcore punk, speed metal and country music. They were one of the most prominent Alberta bands in the second wave of performers that came out of the Canadian west coast DIY scene that was first ushered into Alberta by the iconic hardcore punk band SNFU in the mid-1980s.

== Overview ==
Formed in 1989, the band featured original members Derek Bevans and "Carigh" Brown until 1990. Later on, the line-up consistently included vocalist Mike Caldwell and bassist Corb Lund from the town of Taber, Alberta, guitarist Dug Bevans from Leduc, Alberta and drummer Terry Johnson from the northern Alberta town of La Glace. The four met while attending Grant MacEwan College in Edmonton, where Caldwell, Lund and Johnson were taking classes in music, and Bevans was taking art courses.

The band showed unusual technical ability right from its inception, and was known for the buzzing speed guitar attack of Dug Bevans and arching vocal style of lead singer Mike Caldwell, whose wide vocal range is well showcased in the band's cover of Natural Woman as it appeared on their last release, My Dear Little Angle. Caldwell was known for his considerable vocal skills as well as his unassuming stage manner and refusal to banter with audiences. Corb Lund is more recently known for his work with his roots and country project Corb Lund and the Hurtin' Albertans.

The band was probably best categorized as a hard rock or metal band, but because of its association with the DIY punk rock scene of the 1980s and 1990s, the band never shook the punk rock label. In spite of this label, every album featured a straight jazz number or faithful covers of rock standards such as Middle of the Road (Pretenders, Chrissie Hynde) and songs featuring a variety of styles including country, swing and salsa style jazz breaks, that were embedded in the band's signature hard rock/metal sound.

Near the end of their career Corb Lund had this to say about the band's eclectic style:

"We've outlived a bunch of different scenes that people have tried to lump us into, but we've never seen ourselves as part of a 'scene;' we've never been really into the punk scene, or the speed-metal scene, or the rap-metal scene. People just try to fit us into whatever music happens to be playing at the time, but we've never really paid too much attention to that."

== Career highlights ==
The band sold over 40,000 albums over twelve years and built "a rabid fan base, particularly in western Canada", almost entirely independent of any label or industry support. They were friends with and toured Quebec several times with GrimSkunk. In western Canada the Smalls' high energy shows made the band a touring success and could be counted on to fill large halls when headlining at venues such as Vancouver's legendary Commodore Ballroom, but were also known for extensive touring in outlying areas. In Kamloops, British Columbia they were banned from performing after a riot that took place after a promoter severely overfilled a small venue and the Royal Canadian Mounted Police attempted to clear the hall.

"The Smalls - these guys tore up the underground scene for years 90's and sadly never got their just due. These guys were notorious for starting riots, not because they were instigators (they were all pretty passive and shy guys), but because their music was so high energy people would loose [sic] their minds. As a matter of factly the last time I saw them as we were leaving cause things were right out of control the riot squad was showing up to gain some order."

In 1999, the Smalls became the first Canadian act to perform in the Balkans after conflict engulfed the area in the mid-nineties. Bassist Corb Lund said, "Not many North American bands reach these places. We think it's as important to play in these areas because it's a good opportunity for real cultural exchange."

In 2001, the band announced that it was disbanding and finished its career with a farewell tour with a two-night send-off in Calgary on October 19, 2001, at MacEwan Hall, and Edmonton on October 20, 2001, at Red's.

== Recording history ==
The Smalls garnered significant industry interest at the beginning of their career with the release of their first self-produced recording the smalls in 1990. The band soon became associated with S.L. Feldman & Associates, a major Canadian touring and management agency.

Their second album To Each a Zone (1992) was produced by noted Vancouver punk rock producer Cecil English, who was very often an engineer and sometimes producer on records by NoMeansNo (The Day Everything Became Isolated and Destroyed) and DOA (Win The Battle) -- including a collaboration between Jello Biafra and DOA (Last Scream of the Missing Neighbors). Videos for the singles "Payload" and "On the Warpath from To Each a Zone" went into steady rotation on MuchMusic. Their first recording the smalls was remixed and remastered again with the help of Cecil English and re-released with three new tracks in 1993.

With their third album Waste and Tragedy (1995) the band moved to a new producer, Joel van Dyke (Wide Mouth Mason, Colin James) and a much cleaner sound. The band produced two videos for this release, one for the track "It's Gonna be Fast" and one for the lead single of the album, "Pity the Man with the Fast Right Hand", a song that incorporate country themes into the hard rock/metal format.

The band never signed a recording agreement with a major label but released Waste and Tragedy through Cargo Records, signing a production and distribution deal with label owner Randy Boyd in 1995. Boyd had been successful in capitalizing on the expanding "indie rock" music scene including becoming the first distributor for many Sub Pop artists and the Epitaph Records label in Canada. Shortly thereafter Boyd sold Cargo Records Canada to Alan Fox a successful entrepreneur with no music industry experience. Three years later the company went bankrupt and the smalls were one among many creditors who went out of pocket when the company began to default on payments as it collapsed. The smalls moved their catalog to Outside Music.

Despite ongoing problems with Cargo Records the band secured distribution in Europe and embarked on its first European tour during this period, scenes from which can be found in the documentary called The Smalls... Er Whatever, directed by John Stiles and edited by Ian Harvey. It was filmed during the tour and when they returned to Canada to record what would be their final album, My Dear Little Angle (sic), in 1998. They again switched to a new producer, Glenn Robinson (Gwar, Voivod, Tori Amos, The Tea Party). This album was distributed by Outside Music.

A playful high speed country metal tune featuring layered backing vocals that might be considered a tip of the hat to Ennio Morricone Spaghetti Western compositions called "My Saddle Horse Has Died" later appeared on Corb Lund and the Hurtin' Albertans 2007 release Horse Soldier! Horse Soldier!.

== After the Smalls ==
Bass player Corb Lund has since carried on with Corb Lund and the Hurtin' Albertans, a Juno Award winning and gold record selling roots-country act. Dug Bevans is engaged in Edmonton area projects such as producing and playing on Steve Hobbins recording the Wizard of Words. Dug Bevans was Art Director, Composer, and 'Man with the Vision' for the Burning Man 2011 Trojan Horse art project. Terry Johnson played with local Edmonton hardcore band Secret Rivals. Mike Caldwell went on to sing in a country cover band in Edmonton known as Texas Mikey.

== Reunion ==
The band announced through their official Facebook page on May 27, 2014, that they would be reforming to perform at Edmonton's Sonic Boom Festival in August. The reunion announcement was coupled with the creation of a Twitter page, and a short promo video with interviews. It was also announced that The Smalls were to take part in Calgary's annual X-Fest in August 2014 (along with other artists such as Jack White, Arctic Monkeys, Death Cab for Cutie, Foster the People, Cage the Elephant, etc.).

== Members ==
- Mike Caldwell – vocals
- Corb Lund – bass
- Dug Bevans – guitar
- Terry Johnson – drums

== Discography ==
- The Smalls (album) (released as two cassettes in 1990, remixed & remastered to CD with 3 new tracks in 1993)
- To Each a Zone (1992)
- Waste and Tragedy (1995)
- My Dear Little Angle (1999)
- Selected Works: 1990-2001 (2014 double-LP)
