= Counterfeit Blues =

Studio album by Corb Lund and the Hurtin' Albertans
- Released: June 17, 2014
- Genre: Country
- Length: 38:03
- Label: New West
- Producers: Saam Hashemi; Grant Siemens

Corb Lund and the Hurtin' Albertans chronology
Cabin Fever (2012)	Counterfeit Blues (2014)	Things That Can't Be Undone (2015)

Counterfeit Blues is an album by Corb Lund and the Hurtin' Albertans. It was released in Canada on June 17, 2014, via New West Records and in the United States on July 1. The album was recorded live at Sun Studio in Memphis, Tennessee and features re-cut songs from previous albums. It was originally recorded for a TV special for CMT in Canada. A two-disc CD/DVD set featuring the CMT documentary Memphis Sun with three bonus tracks was also released.

== Critical reception ==
Thom Jurek of AllMusic gave the album four stars out of five, writing that "the band deliver a kinetic, tightrope-without-a-net walking set where new versions stand in stark contrast to originals." Kayla Tinson of Top Country gave the album four and a half stars out of five, calling it "'raw, organic and dirty' in the best possible way." Sarah Greene of NOW gave the album a favorable review, stating that "Lund's best writing is old-fashioned and suits that old-school recording style." Stuart Munro of The Boston Globe also reviewed the album favorably, writing that "it argues for just how good Lund's evocative, regionally rooted songs are, no matter their rendition." Dustin Blumhagen of Country Standard Time gave the album a positive review as well, calling it "a raw recording with a live feel that showcases the extremely talented musicians that make up his band, the Hurtin' Albertans" and "a great gift for long time fans."

== Track listing ==
All tracks are written by Corb Lund except "Hurtin' Albertan", written by Corb Lund and Tim Hus

No.	Title	Length
1.	"Counterfeiters' Blues"	3:33
2.	"Good Copenhagen"	3:20
3.	"Big Butch Bass Bull Fiddle"	2:13
4.	"Hair in My Eyes Like a Highland Steer"	3:17
5.	"Little Foothills Heaven"	3:17
6.	"Five Dollar Bill"	3:28
7.	"Buckin' Horse Rider"	4:00
8.	"Hurtin' Albertan"	3:20
9.	"(Gonna) Shine Up My Boots"	2:19
10.	"Truck Got Stuck"	3:02
11.	"Roughest Neck Around"	3:24
12.	"Truth Comes Out"	3:50
Total length:		38:03

DVD track listing
No.	Title	Length
1.	"Hurtin' Albertan"
2.	"No Roads Here"
3.	"Little Foothills Heaven"
4.	"Counterfeiters' Blues"
5.	"Roughest Neck Around"
6.	"Big Butch Bass Bull Fiddle"
7.	"Hair in My Eyes Like a Highland Steer"
8.	"Truck Got Stuck"
9.	"Truth Comes Out"
10.	"Five Dollar Bill"
11.	"Buckin' Horse Rider" (bonus)
12.	"Good Copenhagen" (bonus)
13.	"(Gonna) Shine Up My Boots" (bonus)
