= Michou (band) =

- Origin: Windsor, Ontario, Canada
- Genres: Folk rock
- Years active: 2007–2012
- Labels: Distort and Green and Gold Music
- Members: Michael Hargreaves (2007-2012); Ryan Frith (2007-2012); Sasha Appler (2007-2012); Stefan Cvetkovic (2009-2012)
- Past members: Ryan Ard (2007-2009); Lucas Semple (2007-2008)
- Website: itsnicetomichou.com

Michou were a Canadian folk rock band from Windsor, Ontario. The group was active between 2007 and 2012.

== History ==
Michou was started by singer-songwriter Mike Hargreaves as a solo project. In 2007 he joined multi-instrumentalist Ryan Ard, keyboardist/trumpeter Sasha Appler, bassist Ryan Frith and drummer Stefan Cvetkovic to create a full band. Michou's first release was 2007's EP, Medea. Their first studio album Myshkin was released 2008 in Canada, and produced a music video for the single "Control" that was aired on MuchMusic and MTV.

Michou recorded three acoustic songs, "Rosehips", "Four Brothers", and "Weak Knees", at Winnipeg's Empire Recording studio. These were released in 2009 as an EP titled Rosehips; the release was limited to 500 Dropcard downloads.

Michou released their second studio album titled Cardona through iTunes Canada in February, 2010. The album included two singles, "Growing Younger" and "Eavesdropping"; videos for these were played extensively on MuchMusic. Cardona was produced by Winnipeg-based musician/producer Phil Deschambeau.

The following year Michou were awarded XM Canada's "Artist of the Year". Later that same year Michou released their second EP entitled Celebrate Love and toured across Canada to support it.

Michou officially disbanding in autumn 2012. Hargreaves and Cvetkovic went on to form The Walkervilles, with longtime friend and fellow Windsor musician Pat Robitaille.

== Discography ==
- Medea (EP) (2007)
- Myshkin (2008)
- Rosehips (EP) (2009)
- Cardona (2010)
- Celebrate Love (EP) (2011)
- Naked (2017)
- Easy Breather (2017)
