= Things That Can't Be Undone =

Studio album by Corb Lund and the Hurtin' Albertans
- Released: October 9, 2015
- Genre: Country
- Length: 35:26
- Label: New West
- Producer: Dave Cobb

Corb Lund and the Hurtin' Albertans chronology
Counterfeit Blues (2014)	Things That Can't Be Undone (2015)	Agricultural Tragic (2020)

Things That Can't Be Undone is the ninth studio album by Corb Lund and the Hurtin' Albertans. It was released by New West Records on October 9, 2015.

== Track listing ==
All tracks are written by Corb Lund except where noted

No.	Title	Writer(s)	Length
1.	"Weight of the Gun"	Lund, Kurt Ciesla, Grant Siemens, Brady Valgardson	3:41
2.	"Run This Town"		2:42
3.	"Alt Berliner Blues"		2:59
4.	"Alice Eyes"	Lund, Jason Eady	3:43
5.	"Sadr City"		5:11
6.	"Washed-Up Rock Star Factory Blues"	Lund, Evan Felker	4:13
7.	"S Lazy H"		5:25
8.	"Goodbye Colorado"	Lund, Willy Braun	2:40
9.	"Talk Too Much"		4:18
10.	"Sunbeam"		2:34

== Personnel ==
=== Corb Lund and the Huntin' Albertans ===
- Kurt Ciesla- baritone guitar
- Corb Lund- lead vocals, acoustic guitar
- Grant Siemans- electric guitar, lap steel guitar
- Brady Valgardson- drums

=== Additional musicians ===
- Dave Cobb- nylon string guitar, percussion
- Leroy Powell- background vocals
- Kristen Rogers- background vocals

== Charts ==
The album debuted on the Hot Country Albums chart at No. 37, selling 1,100 copies in the US in its first week.

Chart (2015)	Peak position
Canadian Albums (Billboard)	8
US Top Country Albums (Billboard)	37
US Heatseekers Albums (Billboard)	10
