= Twentysomething =

Twenty something or twentysomething may refer to:

- Twentysomething (term), a person in the age group of 20 to 29
- Twentysomething (album), a 2003 album by Jamie Cullum
- "Twenty-something", a 2016 single by Pet Shop Boys from the album Super
- Twenty Something (1994 film), a Hong Kong Film directed by Teddy Chan
- Twenty Something (2021 film), a 2D short film by Pixar Animation Studios
- Twentysomething (TV series), an Australian television series
- Twenty Something, a Pan Arab television show about local arts and culture, broadcast weekly on Dubai One starting January 17, 2010
- Twenty-Something, an alias used by electronic music producers Geert Huinink and Alco Lammers
- "20 Something", a song by Dala from the album Angels & Thieves
