= Agricultural Tragic =

Studio album by Corb Lund
- Released: July 26, 2020
- Length: 36:58
- Label: New West

Corb Lund chronology
Things That Can't Be Undone (2015)	Agricultural Tragic (2020)

Professional ratings
Aggregate scores
Source	Rating
Metacritic	81/100
Review scores
Source	Rating
AllMusic	4/5 stars
Exclaim!	9/10
Uncut	7/10

Agriculture Tragic is the tenth studio album by Canadian country singer-songwriter Corb Lund. It was originally scheduled for release on April 24, 2020 under New West Records, however it was pushed to June 26, 2020 due to the COVID-19 pandemic

== Tour ==
A tour of Canada in support of the album was announced for April–July 2020, but was rescheduled to November 2020.

== Critical reception ==
Agricultural Tragic was met with "universal acclaim" reviews from critics. At Metacritic, which assigns a weighted average rating out of 100 to reviews from mainstream publications, this release received an average score of 81, based on 4 reviews.

== Track listing ==
Agricultural Tragic track listing
No.	Title	Length
1.	"90 Seconds of Your Time"	2:41
2.	"Old Men"	3:30
3.	"I Think You Outta Try Whiskey" (featuring Jaida Dreyer)	3:05
4.	"Raining Horses"	3:09
5.	"Oklahomans"	1:53
6.	"Grizzly Bear Blues"	3:41
7.	"Dance With Your Spurs On"	2:37
8.	"Louis L'Amour"	3:20
9.	"Never Not Had Horses"	3:48
10.	"Ranchin', Ridin', Romance (Two Outta Three Ain't Bad)"	3:14
11.	"Rat Patrol"	3:02
12.	"Tattoos Blues"	3:06
Total length:		36:58

== Charts ==
Chart performance for Agricultural Tragic
Chart (2020)	Peak position
Canadian Albums (Billboard)	31
US Top Album Sales (Billboard)	40
US Top Country Albums (Billboard)	31
