= Unforgiving Mistress =

Studio album by Corb Lund and the Hurtin' Albertans
- Released: 1999
- Genre: Roots/Country/Blues
- Length: 37:04
- Label: Outside Music
- Producer: Steve Loree

Corb Lund and the Hurtin' Albertans chronology
Modern Pain (1995)	Unforgiving Mistress (1999)	Five Dollar Bill (2002)

Unforgiving Mistress, released in 1999, is the second album by Canadian country singer Corb Lund.

== Track listing ==
1. "Mora (Blackberry)" - 3:40
2. "The Case of the Wine Soaked Preacher" - 3:21
3. "Remains of You" - 2:47
4. "Guitar from the Wall" - 3:11
5. "Where is my Soldier?" - 3:23
6. "Spanish Armada" - 3:26
7. "I've Been Needin'" - 4:18
8. "Young and Jaded" - 2:07
9. "Engine Revver" - 3:21
10. "We Used to Ride 'em" - 2:58
11. "The Oldest Rhythm" - 4:25
