= Everyone Is Someone =

Everyone is Someone

Studio album by Dala
- Released: June 9, 2009
- Recorded: 2009
- Genre: Folk, Rock, Acoustic
- Length: 42:18
- Label: Campus Music/Lenz Entertainment
- Producer: Mike Roth

Dala chronology
Who Do You Think You Are (album) (2007)	Everyone is Someone (2009)	Best Day (album) (2012)

Everyone Is Someone is the fourth studio album by Canadian band Dala. It was released on June 9, 2009.

== Track listing ==
All tracks are written by Sheila Carabine, Amanda Walther and Mike Roth, except where noted

No.	Title	Length
1.	"Lonely Girl" (Carabine/Walther)	4:23
2.	"Alive"	4:02
3.	"Crushed"	4:44
4.	"Levi Blues"	3:02
5.	"Horses"	4:21
6.	"Compass" (Carabine/Walther)	3:43
7.	"Northern Lights" (Carabine/Walther)	4:16
8.	"Face In The Morning" (Walther)	2:56
9.	"Younger"	3:59
10.	"Stand In Awe"	3:25
11.	"Levi Blues (AM Transistor Remix)"	3:27

== Personnel ==
- Sheila Carabine - Lead and background vocals, acoustic guitars, piano, keyboards, mandolin
- Amanda Walther - Lead and background vocals, acoustic guitars, piano, keyboards
- Mike Roth - Electric and acoustic guitars (tk 1,9) and keyboards (tk 6), producer, engineer
- Daniel Roth - Electric and acoustic guitars (tk 1,3,10), handclaps (tk 4,11)
- Gary Craig - Drums and percussion
- Adrian Walther - Lead bass (tk 1,9)
- Michael Carabine - Electric and acoustic guitars (tk 2)
- Dennis Pendrith - Bass (tk 4,5,7,10)
- Maria Jacobsson - Harp
- Kevin Fox - Cello (tk 1)
- Ashley Summers - Bass (tk 2,3)
- Chris Bilton - Keyboards and string arrangements (tk 3,5) and keyboards (tk 4), handclaps (tk 4,11)
- Asher Lenz - Keyboards (tk 4,11)
- Doug Cameron - Mandolin (tk 2,7) and banjo (tk 4)
- Adam Crossley - Handclaps (tk 4,11)
- Adrian Vanelli - Additional drums (tk 1)
- Tim Walther - Cow bell
- Andrew Carabine - Icicle keyboards

== Reception ==
Everyone Is Someone was released to critical acclaim. It earned Dala their fifth Canadian Folk Music Award nomination, a Toronto Independent Music Award for Best Folk Group, and was touted by The Irish Post as the Album of the Year. The song Horses was nominated by National Public Radio in the US as one of the Top Ten folk songs of 2009. The lead single Levi Blues was nominated in the Mainstream Adult Contemporary category at the 2010 Canadian Radio Music Awards.
