= Sultans of String =

Canadian instrumental group

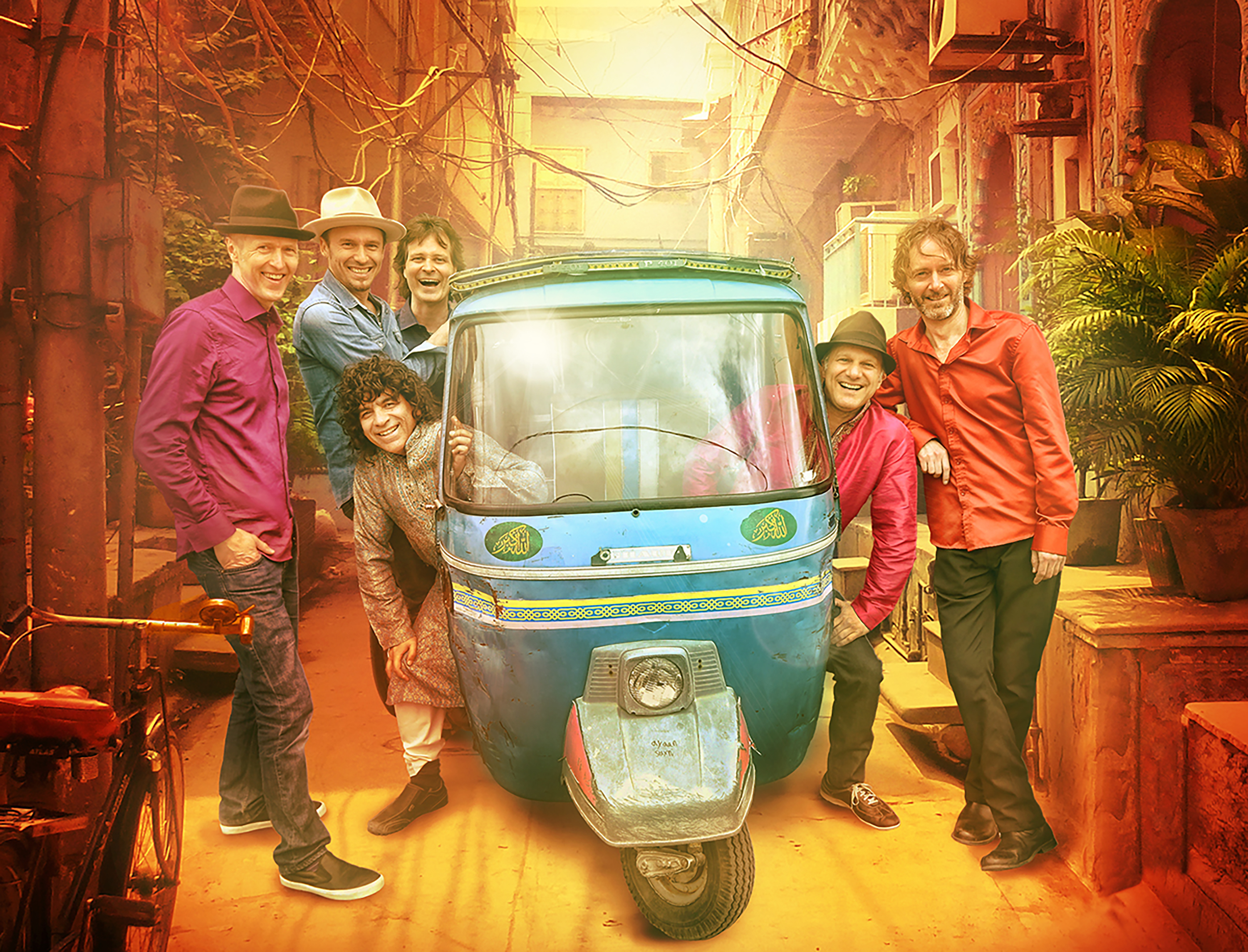
- Sultans of String in 2015

Background information
- Origin: Toronto, Ontario, Canada
- Genres: World, instrumental
- Members: Chris McKhool; Kevin Laliberté; Drew Birston; Rosendo Chendy Leon
- Website: www.sultansofstring.com

Sultans of String are an instrumental music group based in Toronto, Ontario, combining elements of Spanish flamenco, Arabic folk, Cuban rhythms, and French Manouche Django-jazz. The group's leader is producer and Canadian musician Chris McKhool.

== History ==
Founding members Chris McKhool and Kevin Laliberté began performing together in 2004, combing McKhool's six-stringed violin and Laliberté's flamenco guitar. They began recording and touring with a full band, performing at festivals and events around Ontario.

In 2007 Sultans of String released their first album, Luna, which won a 2007 Musique du Monde Award and an Ontario Independent Music Award for Best Song and Best Instrumental. They were named Best Latin Jazz Group by Exclusive Magazine, and were nominated for a Canadian Folk Music Award (Best Instrumentalist Group) and a Toronto Independent Music Awards (World Music).

In 2008 Luna was a #1 hit across Canada on Top Ten national radio charts in the “International” & ” World/Folk” categories. That year the band won the International Songwriting Competition Award (instrumental), and was named Best Variety Act by Festivals & Events Ontario. The band were finalists for the International Independent Music Award for Best World Fusion Song.

In 2009 the band released their second album, Yalla Yalla, which was nominated for three Canadian Folk Music Awards, winning Instrumental Group of the Year, and in the finals for Ensemble of the Year and Pushing the Boundaries. They once again won the instrumental category of the International Songwriting Competition. Exclusive named them Artist of the Year and their album Yalla Yalla won Best Toronto World CD. In 2010 they were nominated as Favourite World Artist/Group at the Canadian Independent Music Awards. Yalla Yalla was nominated for a 2010 JUNO Award as Instrumental Album of the Year.

In 2011 Yalla Yalla was a finalist for an Independent Music Award in two categories, Instrumental Album and World Beat Album. Two of the band's songs, ”Auyuittuq Sunrise” and ”Gardens Of Lebanon”, were nominated for the International Songwriting Competition awards. In May that year the band's 3rd album MOVE was released.

Move appeared on the !earshot Campus and Community National Top 50 Albums chart in January, 2012. That year the band won a Canadian Folk Music Award as World Music Group of the Year and were nominated for Instrumental Group of the Year and Pushing The Boundaries McKhool was nominated as Producer of the Year. The band were 2012 OCFF (Ontario Council of Folk Festivals) Songs of the Heart winners and Festivals & Events Entertainers of the Year.

In 2013 band leader Chris McKhool was presented with a Queen's Diamond Jubilee Medal for his work in supporting community and music education programs for at-risk youth, and raising awareness of social and environmental issues through music.

Also in 2013 the band released their fourth album, Symphony! One of the tracks, “Monti’s Revenge”, won the ISC International Songwriting Competition and was named a Song of the Heart winner by Folk Music Ontario. The band was also named Festivals & Events Performer of the Year and nominated for a SiriusXM Canadian Indie Award. In 2014 the band was named World Group of the Year at the SIRIUSXM Independent Music Awards. Their song "Josie" was named Instrumental Song of the Year at the 2014 Independent Music Awards, and McKhool and Rebecca Pellett were given the Vox Pop Award for production of Symphony! This symphony recording and live show was developed under the direction of luminary John Morris Russell (conductor, Cincinnati Pops Orchestra), and was scored by illustrious arranger/composer Rebecca Pellett (Toronto Symphony Orchestra, IMAX & Hollywood film productions). They toured this album across North America including with the Annapolis Symphony Orchestra, Chicago’s Full Score Chamber Orchestra, and Bangor Symphony in the USA. They also performed with many Canadian symphonies including Toronto, Vancouver, Edmonton, Kitchener-Waterloo Symphony, Niagara, North Bay, Windsor, and Kingston Symphony Orchestra. Symphony! was nominated for a 2015 JUNO Award, and the band won a 2015 Toronto Independent Music Award for World Music.

That same year Sultans of String independently released their fifth album, Subcontinental Drift. This album was made in collaboration with sitarist Anwar Khurshid; in 2016 the band toured across Canada, the United States and the UK with this formation. This album also took them to the Billboard World Music charts in 2017. Subcontinental drift also received a JUNO Award nomination in the World Music category as well as their 3rd Canadian Folk Music Award for World Group of the year.

In 2017 the band released a world music Christmas album entitled Christmas Caravan. They toured across Canada in support of the album, which was included in The New York Times Holiday Hits section and Spotify's Holiday Albums Hit List, as well as hitting the Billboard World Music charts at #6. Special guests included Richard Bona, Nikki Yanofsky, Rubén Blades, Sweet Honey in the Rock, Alex Cuba, and the City of Prague Philharmonic Orchestra. Sultans of String's composition "Snake Charmer" was used in the soundtrack of the film Hotel Mumbai.

== Discography ==
- Luna (May 2007)
- Yalla Yalla (May 2009)
- MOVE (September 2011)
- Symphony! (September 2013)
- Subcontinental Drift (September 2015)
- Christmas Caravan (October 2017)
- Refuge (August 2020)
- Sanctuary: The Refuge Project (November 2021)
- Walking Through the Fire (September 2023)

== Members ==
- Chris McKhool (Club Django, Jesse Cook, Pavlo) - six-stringed violin
- Kevin Laliberté (Jesse Cook, Amanda Martinez) - flamenco guitar
- Drew Birston (Chantal Kreviazuk) - bass
- Rosendo 'Chendy' Leon (Alex Cuba, The Parachute Club) - percussion
- Saskia Tomkins - Nykelharpa

== Awards and nominations ==
- 2018 Canadian Folk Music Awards: Producer of the Year nomination for McKhool
- 2017 New York Times Hits List
- 2017 Billboard World Music Charts: Christmas Caravan CD hits #6
- 2017 Folk Music Ontario: Songs From The Heart Award for "Sing For Kwanzaa" from Christmas Caravan
- 2017 Folk Music Ontario: Songs From The Heart Award for “Road to Kfarmishki”
- 2017 ISC International Songwriting Competition: World category for "Sing For Kwanzaa"
- 2017 JUNO Awards: Nominees for "World Music Album of the Year" for Subcontinental Drift
- 2017 Billboard World Music Charts: Subcontinental Drift CD hits #15
- 2016 Canadian Folk Music Awards: World Music Group of the Year
- 2015 International Songwriting Competition (ISC) for "Ho Jamalo"
- 2015 JUNO Awards: Nominees for "Instrumental Album of the Year" for Symphony!
- 2015 Toronto Independent Music Award: World Music
- 2014 SIRIUSXM Independent Music Awards Winner: World Group of the Year
- 2014 IMA Independent Music Award Winner : Instrumental Song for "Josie"
- 2014 IMA Independent Music Vox Pop Award: Music Producer (Chris McKhool) for Symphony!
- 2013 ISC International Songwriting Competition: Instrumental category for "Monti's Revenge"
- 2013 Folk Music Ontario: Songs From The Heart Award for "Monti's Revenge"
- 2013 Queen’s Diamond Jubilee Medal for bandleader Chris McKhool
- 2013 SiriusXM Canadian Indie Awards: Nominee for World Group of the Year
- 2008 International Songwriting Competition(ISC): Winner - Instrumental
