= Cabin Fever (Corb Lund album) =

Studio album by Corb Lund and the Hurtin' Albertans
- Released: August 14, 2012
- Genre: Country
- Length: 44:24
- Label: New West
- Producers: Steven Christensen; John Evans; The Hurtin' Albertans

Corb Lund and the Hurtin' Albertans chronology
Losin' Lately Gambler (2009)	Cabin Fever (2012)	Counterfeit Blues (2014)

Singles from Cabin Fever
- 1. "September" Released: July 9, 2012; 2. "Bible on the Dash" Released: April 2013

Cabin Fever is the seventh studio album by Corb Lund and the Hurtin' Albertans. It was released by New West Records on August 14, 2012.

The album was named a longlisted nominee for the 2013 Polaris Music Prize on June 13, 2013.

== Track listing ==
All tracks are written by Corb Lund except where noted.

No.	Title	Writer(s)	Length
1.	"Gettin' Down on the Mountain"		3:28
2.	"Dig Gravedigger Dig"		4:10
3.	"Bible on the Dash" (with Hayes Carll)	Jason Boland, Hayes Carll, Lund	4:30
4.	"September"		4:43
5.	"Mein Deutsches Motorrad"		2:32
6.	"Cows Around"		4:30
7.	"(You Ain't a Cowboy) If You Ain't Been Bucked Off"	Lund, Matt Skinner	2:59
8.	"Drink It Like You Mean It"		3:04
9.	"Priceless Antique Pistol Shoots Startled Owner"		3:59
10.	"The Gothest Girl I Can"		3:42
11.	"One Left in the Chamber"	Lund, Skinner	3:15
12.	"Pour 'Em Kinda Strong"		3:32

== Chart performance ==
Chart (2012)	Peak position
Canadian Albums Chart	1
US Billboard Top Country Albums	51
US Billboard Top Heatseekers	13

== Certifications ==
Certifications for Cabin Fever
Region	Certification	Certified units/sales
Canada (Music Canada)	Gold	40,000^{‡}
^{‡} Sales+streaming figures based on certification alone.
