= Losin' Lately Gambler =

Studio album by Corb Lund and the Hurtin' Albertans
- Released: September 22, 2009
- Genre: Country
- Length: 42:48
- Label: New West
- Producer: Harry Stinson

Corb Lund and the Hurtin' Albertans chronology
Horse Soldier! Horse Soldier! (2007)	Losin' Lately Gambler (2009)	Cabin Fever (2012)

Singles from Losin' Lately Gambler
- 1. "A Game in Town Like This" Released: August 17, 2009; 2. "Long Gone to Saskatchewan" Released: September 21, 2009; 3. "Devil's Best Dress" Released: March 29, 2010; 4. "This Is My Prairie" Released: August 23, 2010

Losin' Lately Gambler is the sixth studio album by Corb Lund and the Hurtin' Albertans. It was released in Canada on New West Records on September 22, 2009. It is also Lund's first album to be released in the United States.

== Track listing ==
All tracks are written by Corb Lund except where noted.

No.	Title	Writer(s)	Length
1.	"Horse Doctor, Come Quick"		3:55
2.	"Steer Rider's Blues"		3:00
3.	"A Game in Town Like This"		4:21
4.	"Alberta Says Hello"		3:22
5.	"Talkin' Veterinarian Blues"		3:40
6.	"It's Hard to Keep a White Shirt Clean"		2:33
7.	"Long Gone to Saskatchewan"		3:31
8.	"Devil's Best Dress"		2:32
9.	"The Only Long Rider I Know"		3:58
10.	"Chinook Wind"		3:30
11.	"This Is My Prairie"	Lund, Harry Stinson	3:48
12.	"Rye Whiskey/Time to Switch to Whiskey" (live recording)	Lund, traditional	4:38

== Chart performance ==
Chart (2009)	Peak position
Canadian Albums Chart	20

== Certifications ==
Certifications for Losin' Lately Gambler
Region	Certification	Certified units/sales
Canada (Music Canada)	Gold	40,000^{‡}
^{‡} Sales+streaming figures based on certification alone.
