= Medea (EP) =

EP by Michou
- Released: November 24, 2007
- Genre: Folk; Indie
- Producer: Joel Bruyere

Professional ratings
Review scores
Source	Rating
Windsor Star	5/5 stars

Medea (2007) is the debut EP by Michou. It was recorded in two days by founding members Michael Hargreaves, Ryan Ard, Ryan Frith, Lucas Semple and Sasha Appler in the home of friend Joel Bruyere and released on November 24, 2007.

The title of this album is an example of Michou's strong use of literary figures in order to complement the story telling of their music, just as their debut full length is named after the protagonist, Prince Lev Nikolaevich Myshkin, in the novel The Idiot by Fyodor Dostoevsky. The song "The Queen's Line" touches on elements of Kierkegaardian philosophy with the opening line "This is my infinite resignation".

The baby blue cardboard CD sleeve looks like it was home-crafted with a sewing machine and yellow thread. Inside, the music is just as charming: winsome acoustic DIY indie rock with nice-guy vocals, complemented by keyboard touches, various musical doodads and gentle percussion.

— Dalson Chen, The Windsor Star

== Track listing ==
1. "None The Less"
2. "Careless"
3. "The Queen's Line"
4. "St. Mary's Park"
5. "Untimely Event"
