= Five Dollar Bill =

Studio album by Corb Lund and the Hurtin' Albertans
- Released: June 11, 2002
- Recorded: Hum Depot (Nashville); Homestead Recorders (Edmonton)
- Genre: Roots/Country/Blues
- Length: 37:48
- Label: Stony Plain Records, Loose Music
- Producer: Harry Stinson

Corb Lund and the Hurtin' Albertans chronology
Unforgiving Mistress (1999)	Five Dollar Bill (2002)	Hair in My Eyes Like a Highland Steer (2005)

Five Dollar Bill is the third album by Canadian country artist Corb Lund, and the first on which his backing band was credited as The Hurtin' Albertans. It was also Lund's first album to be certified gold for sales of 50,000 copies in Canada. It won the "Outstanding Album (Independent)" at the 2003 Western Canadian Music Awards. It was also ranked the #1 album of 2002 by The Gauntlet, the student newspaper of the University of Calgary.

== Track listing ==
All songs written by Corb Lund.

1. Five Dollar Bill - 2:33
2. Expectation and the Blues - 2:56
3. Short Native Grasses (Prairies of Alberta) - 3:46
4. There Are No Roads Here - 3:21
5. Apocalyptic Modified Blues - 3:03
6. Heavy and Leaving - 3:25
7. Intro/Jack of Diamonds - 0:36
8. Time to Switch to Whiskey - 2:53
9. Roughest Neck Around - 3:12
10. Daughter Don't You Marry No Guitar Picker - 2:23
11. (Gonna) Shine Up My Boots - 2:13
12. Buckin' Horse Rider - 3:34
13. She Won't Come to Me - 3:45
