= Angels & Thieves =

Studio album by Dala
- Released: November 1, 2005
- Recorded: 2005
- Genres: Folk, Rock, Acoustic
- Length: 34:13
- Label: Universal Music Group
- Producer: Mike Roth

Dala chronology
| This Moment Is a Flash (2005) | Angels & Thieves (2005) | Who Do You Think You Are (2007) |

Angels & Thieves is the second studio album by Canadian band Dala. It was released on November 1, 2005.

== Track listing ==
All tracks are written by Sheila Carabine and Amanda Walther, except where noted.

| No. | Title | Length |
|---|---|---|
| 1. | "20 Something" | 3:26 |
| 2. | "Drive Through Summer" | 3:32 |
| 3. | "A Man Needs a Maid" (Neil Young) | 4:25 |
| 4. | "Angels and Thieves" | 3:50 |
| 5. | "Patches" (Walther) | 3:33 |
| 6. | "Out of Time" (Albarn/James/Rowntree) | 2:22 |
| 7. | "Where Have All the Boys Gone?" | 3:27 |
| 8. | "Love Song" (Smith/Gallup/O'Donnell/Thompson/Williams) | 4:11 |
| 9. | "Catch the Wind" (Donovan Leitch) | 3:28 |
| 10. | "Dream a Little Dream of Me" (Andre/Kahn/Schwandt) | 1:59 |

== Personnel ==
- Sheila Carabine - lead and background vocals, acoustic guitar, piano, keyboards
- Amanda Walther - lead and background vocals, guitar, piano, keyboards, harmonica, ukulele, strum stick
- Mike Roth - guitar, bass, keyboards, percussion, producer, engineer
- Adrian Vanelli - drums, percussion
- Mike Carabine - guitar
- Dan Roth - guitar
- Andrew Rozalowsky - bass
- Tim Walther - tambourine
- Tawgs Salter - bass, drums, percussion, guitar, keyboards
