= Penny Lang =

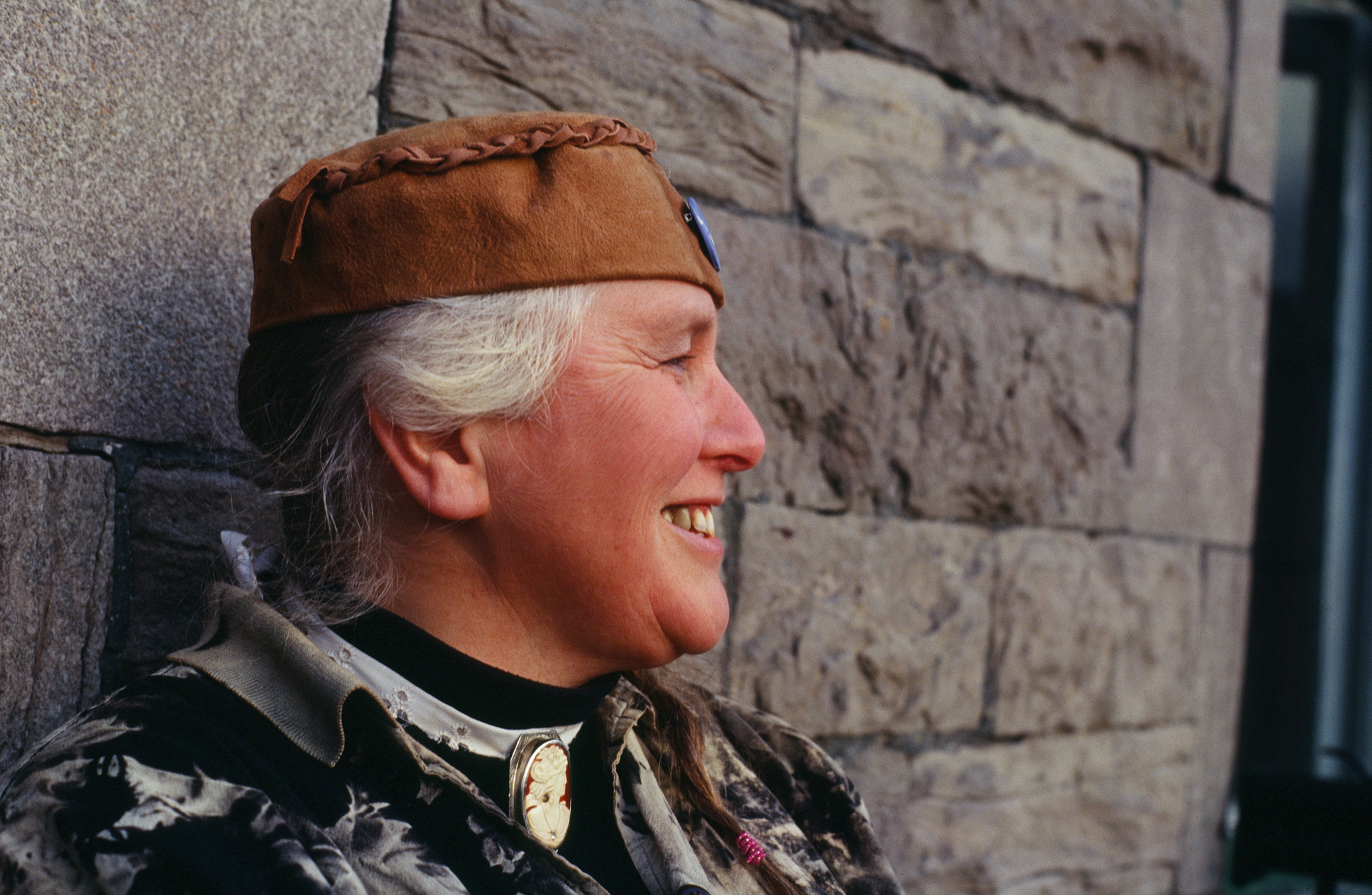

Background information
- Born: Penny Lang; July 15, 1942; Montreal, Quebec, Canada
- Died: July 31, 2016 (aged 74) Madeira Park, British Columbia, Canada
- Genres: Folk
- Occupations: Musician, singer-songwriter
- Instruments: Vocals; Guitar
- Years active: 1963–2016
- Labels: Borealis; She-Wolf; Festival

Penny Lang (July 15, 1942 – July 31, 2016) was a Canadian folk music artist who earned a loyal following, influencing many artists. She performed at major folk festivals and clubs across North America.

== Early years ==
Lang was born in 1942 to a musical family in east end Montreal. She learned about singing and storytelling around the family’s kitchen table and started performing publicly at age 10 with her family in a revue called “The Irish and Canadian Musical Revue” that played legion halls, theaters, hospitals and prisons. In her late teens, Lang got caught up in the folk revival.

== Career ==
In 1963, at age 21, Lang became a professional folk singer and worked initially at the Café André, a venue near the McGill University campus, for three years. She performed on the Montreal folk sceneand became a touring artist, playing folk festivals like Mariposa and Philadelphia and clubs like Gerde’s Folk City in New York City, Caffè Lena in Saratoga Springs, N.Y., the Riverboat in Toronto and Le Hibou in Ottawa.

Her songs are of the human condition. A major highlight of her career was her 1970 sold-out concert at Théâtre Port Royal at Place des Arts in Montreal. After an extended time away from professional life living in Morin Heights, a small village in the Laurentian Mountains where she raised her son, she returned to full-time performing and was welcomed back to an adoring public. She returned to the studio in 1989 and recorded nine albums for the She-Wolf Festival and Borealis labels and toured Australia, Italy, Denmark, France and the United Kingdom.

== Death ==
Penny died on July 31, 2016, at her home in Madeira Park on British Columbia’s Sunshine Coast, where she had been living since 2005.

== Honors and awards ==
Penny’s story was the subject of the 1999 documentary Stand Up: On High Ground with Penny Lang by Jocelyne Clarke, which premiered at the Silver Images Film Festival in Chicago. She received the first Prix Folqui awarded by FOLQUEBEC in 2003.

Lang's 2001 album, Gather Honey, was nominated for a JUNO Award.

== Discography ==
- "Live at The Yellow Door", She-Wolf, 1992; Festival, 1998
- "Yes", She-Wolf, 1991; Festival, 1993
- "Ain't Life Sweet", She-Wolf, 1993, 2007
- "Carry On Children", She-Wolf, 1996
- "Penny Lang & Friends Live", She-Wolf, 1998
- "Somebody Else", She-Wolf, 1999
- "Gather Honey", Borealis, 2001
- "Stone + Sand + Sea + Sky", Borealis, 2006
- "Live", She-Wolf, 2007
