= Corb Lund =

Canadian singer-songwriter (born 1969)

- Born: Corby Clark Marinus Lund; January 29, 1969 (age 57); Taber, Alberta, Canada
- Genres: Country; alternative country; folk; bluegrass; Western
- Years active: 1995–present
- Labels: New West, Loose Music
- Members: Corb Lund; Sean Burns (bass); Grant Siemens (guitar); Lyle Molzan/Brady Valgardson (drums)
- Website: www.corblund.com

Corby Clark Marinus Lund (born January 29, 1969) is a Canadian country and western singer-songwriter from Taber, Alberta, Canada. He has released twelve albums, three of which are certified gold. Lund tours regularly in Canada, the United States and Australia, and has received several awards in Canada and abroad.

== Biography ==
Corb Lund grew up in Southern Alberta living on his family's farm and ranches near Taber, Cardston and Rosemary. Lund left his hometown of Taber and moved to Edmonton, where he enrolled in the Grant MacEwan College to study jazz guitar and bass.

Lund was a founding member of The Smalls. The band retired in the fall of 2001 but reunited in 2014 for a string of shows, the so-called "Slight Return" tour.

Lund formed his country trio, the Corb Lund Band, in 1995. He turned his attention to his own band exclusively when the Smalls broke up in 2001. The band changed its name to "Corb Lund and the Hurtin' Albertans" in 2005 shortly after guitarist Grant Siemens joined the group, and has been touring and recording under that title ever since.

== Other media ==
Lund starred as the 50-year-old oilfield contractor Ray Mitchell in the 2022 Canadian film Guitar Lessons.

== Personal life ==
Lund currently lives in Lethbridge, Alberta, and spends much of his downtime at his family ranch east of Mountain View, Alberta.

== The Hurtin' Albertans ==
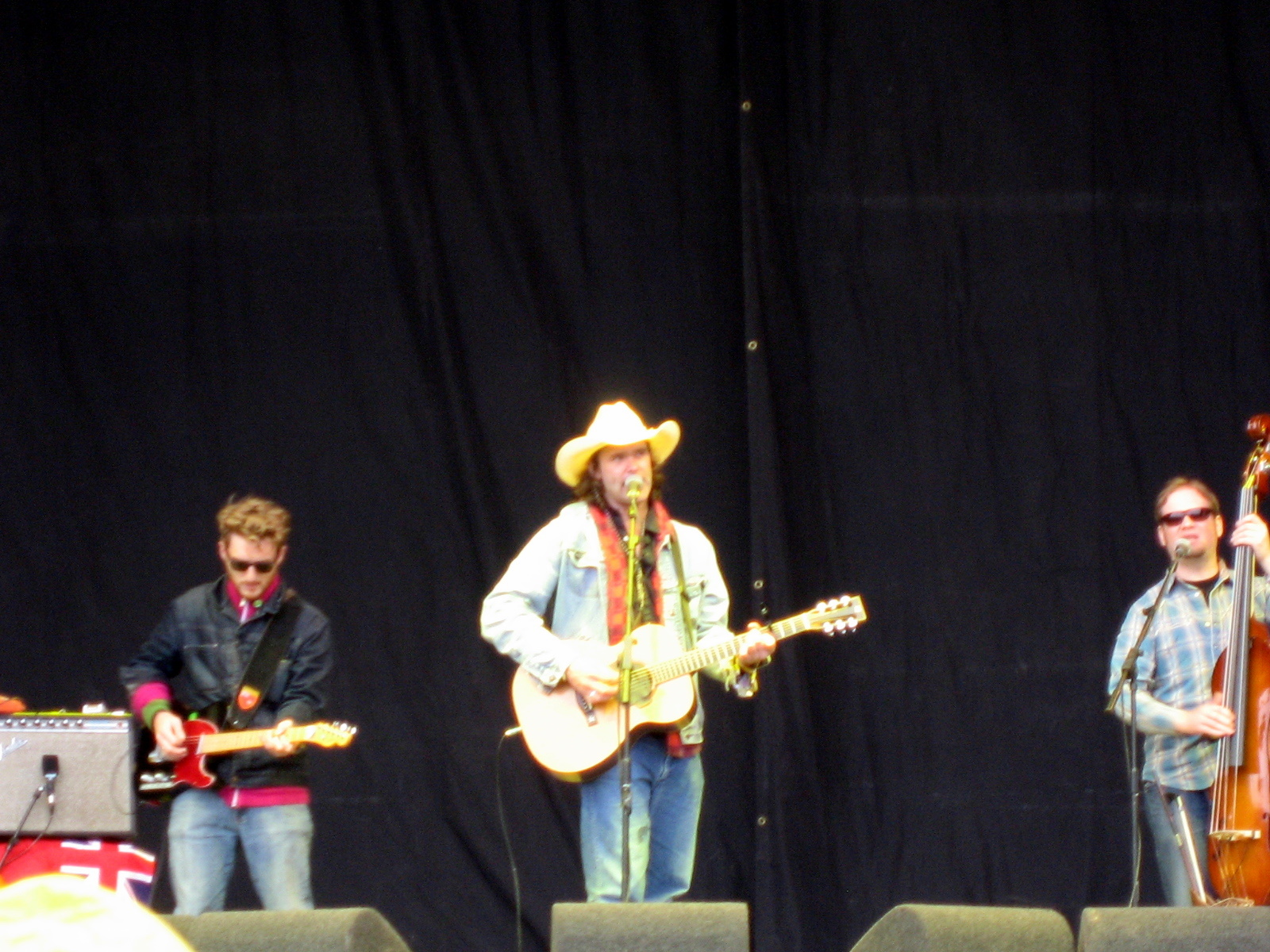
Corb Lund and the Hurtin' Albertans at the 2007 Glastonbury Festival

Corb Lund and the Hurtin' Albertans are a Canadian country music band, formerly known as the Corb Lund Band. The Hurtin' Albertans is Lund's touring band. They have released nine albums to critical acclaim. The band tours regularly in Canada, the United States and Australia. Much of their time is spent in the Canadian Prairies and the American southwest.

The band's members are:

- Sean Burns, bass
- Grant "Demon" Siemens, guitar and other strings
- Lyle Molzan/Brady Valgardson, drums

Former Members:

- Ryan "Vik" Vikedal, drums
- Kurt Ciesla, bass
- Karie Brown, bass

The band has toured Europe, where they played the UK Glastonbury Festival, and Australia several times. The group was featured in the movie "Slither" (2006) and were part of the soundtrack to the 2008 documentary, "Holler Back: (Not) Voting in an American Town." They have also provided accompaniment for an NBC special in 2006, on which former world figure skating champion and fellow Albertan, Kurt Browning, performed a routine to "Expectation and the Blues". Their music can also be heard in the ski film "Nine Winters Old."

Lund signed a three-album deal with New West Records (home of Dwight Yoakam, Steve Earle, Kris Kristofferson and other major artists) in 2009. His first record on New West, Losin' Lately Gambler, was released in September 2009.

Corb Lund and the Hurtin' Albertans played their 2009 single "Long Gone to Saskatchewan" in Ottawa for the 2011 Canada Day ceremonies in the presence of the newlywed Duke and Duchess of Cambridge on their Royal visit to Canada.

Corb Lund and the Hurtin' Albertans released their seventh studio album, Cabin Fever, on August 14, 2012. It debuted at number 1 on the Billboard Canadian Albums Chart. In June 2013, the album was longlisted for the 2013 Polaris Music Prize.

Corb Lund released Things That Can't Be Undone in 2015. Lund worked with producer Dave Cobb (Sturgill Simpson, Chris Stapleton, Jason Isbell) to explore new styles and sounds on the album. The album appeared on the !earshot National Top 50 Chart in December that year.

== Discography ==
=== Studio albums ===
Title	Album details	Peak chart positions			Certifications (sales threshold)
Title	Album details	CAN	US Country	US Heat	Certifications (sales threshold)
Modern Pain	Release date: October 13, 1995; Label: Outside; Formats: CD, cassette	—	—	—	
Unforgiving Mistress	Release date: October 22, 1999; Label: Outside; Formats: CD, cassette	—	—	—	
Five Dollar Bill	Release date: June 11, 2002; Label: Stony Plain, Loose (Europe); Formats: CD	—	—	—	MC: Gold
Hair in My Eyes Like a Highland Steer	Release date: September 6, 2005; Label: Stony Plain, Loose (Europe); Formats: CD, digital download	—	—	—	MC: Gold
Horse Soldier! Horse Soldier!	Release date: November 13, 2007; Label: Stony Plain; Formats: CD, digital download	25	—	—	MC: Gold
Losin' Lately Gambler	Release date: September 22, 2009; Label: New West; Formats: CD, LP, digital download	20	—	—	MC: Gold
Cabin Fever	Release date: August 14, 2012; Label: New West; Formats: CD, LP, digital download	1	51	13	MC: Gold
Counterfeit Blues	Release date: June 17, 2014; Label: New West; Formats: CD, LP, digital download	—	—	—	
Things That Can't Be Undone	Release date: October 9, 2015; Label: New West; Formats: CD, digital download	8	37	10	
Agricultural Tragic	Release date: June 26, 2020; Label: New West; Formats: CD, LP, digital download, streaming	31	31	—	
Songs My Friends Wrote	Release date: April 29, 2022; Label: Warner; Formats: CD, LP, digital download, streaming	—	—	—	
El Viejo	February 23, 2024; Label: New West; Format: Digital download, streaming	—	—	—	
"—" denotes releases that did not chart

=== Extended plays ===
Title	Album details	Peak chart positions
Title	Album details	US Heat
Cover Your Tracks	Release date: September 13, 2019; Label: New West Records	23

=== Singles ===
Year	Single	Peak positions	Album
Year	Single	CAN Country	Album
2002	"No Roads Here"	*	Five Dollar Bill
2003	"Five Dollar Bill"	*	Five Dollar Bill
2003	"Roughest Neck Around"	*	Five Dollar Bill
2003	"Time to Switch to Whiskey"	*	Five Dollar Bill
2004	"(Gonna) Shine Up My Boots"	—	Five Dollar Bill
2004	"Roughest Neck Around" (re-release)	—	Five Dollar Bill
2005	"Truck Got Stuck"	27	Hair in My Eyes Like a Highland Steer
2006	"Hair in My Eyes Like a Highland Steer"	15	Hair in My Eyes Like a Highland Steer
2006	"Counterfeiters' Blues"	—	Hair in My Eyes Like a Highland Steer
2006	"Truth Comes Out"	—	Hair in My Eyes Like a Highland Steer
2007	"I Wanna Be in the Cavalry"	28	Horse Soldier! Horse Soldier!
2008	"Family Reunion"	45	Horse Soldier! Horse Soldier!
2008	"Horse Soldier, Horse Soldier"	—	Horse Soldier! Horse Soldier!
2009	"Hard on Equipment (Tool for the Job)"	—	Horse Soldier! Horse Soldier!
2009	"A Game in Town Like This"	—	Losin' Lately Gambler
2009	"Long Gone to Saskatchewan"	46	Losin' Lately Gambler
2010	"Devil's Best Dress"	45	Losin' Lately Gambler
2010	"This Is My Prairie"	—	Losin' Lately Gambler
2012	"Gettin' Down On The Mountain"	—	Cabin Fever
2012	"Dig Gravedigger Dig"	—	Cabin Fever
2012	"September"	—	Cabin Fever
2013	"Bible on the Dash" (with Hayes Carll)	—	Non-album single
2015	"Run This Town"	—	Things That Can't Be Undone
2015	"Washed Up Rockstar Factory Blues"	—	Things That Can't Be Undone
2015	"Weight Of The Gun"	—	Things That Can't Be Undone
2020	"I Think You Oughta Try Whiskey" (feat. Jaida Dreyer)	—	Agricultural Tragic
2021	"This Is My Prairie" (feat. Brett Kissel and Terri Clark)	—	Non-album single
2022	"Highway 87"	—	Songs My Friends Wrote
2023	"Old Familiar Drunken Feeling"	—	El Viejo
2023	"Out on a Win"	—	El Viejo
2024	"Redneck Rehab"	—	El Viejo

=== Music videos ===
Year	Video	Director
2004	"(Gonna) Shine Up My Boots"	Joel Stewart
2004	"Roughest Neck Around"	Joel Stewart
2005	"The Truck Got Stuck"	Joel Stewart
2006	"Hair in My Eyes Like a Highland Steer"	Joel Stewart
2006	"Counterfeiters' Blues"	Thaddeus Grant Fenton
2006	"Truth Comes Out"	Trevor Smith
2007	"I Wanna Be in the Cavalry"	Trevor Smith
2008	"Family Reunion"	Trevor Smith/John Kerr
2009	"Hard on Equipment (Tool for the Job)"	Trevor Smith
2009	"A Game in Town Like This"	Trevor Smith
2010	"Devil's Best Dress"	Christopher Mills
2012	"Gettin' Down on the Mountain"	Fish Griwkowsky
2012	"September"	Trevor Smith
2012	"Dig Gravedigger Dig"	
2013	"Bible on the Dash" (with Hayes Carll)	Blake Judd
2014	"Just Me and These Ponies (For Christmas This Year)"	Trevor Smith
2015	"Run This Town"	Joshua Shoemaker
2016	"Washed-Up Rock Star Factory Blues"	Ryan Hamblin
2016	"S Lazy H"	Trevor Smith

== Awards and achievements ==
=== JUNO Awards (Canada) ===
Year	Category	Result
2003	Roots & Traditional Album of the Year – Solo – Five Dollar Bill	Nominated
2006	Roots & Traditional Album of the Year – Solo – Hair in My Eyes Like a Highland Steer	Won
2008	Roots & Traditional Album of the Year – Solo – Horse Soldier! Horse Soldier!	Nominated
2010	Roots & Traditional Album of the Year – Solo – Losin' Lately Gambler	Nominated
2013	Roots & Traditional Album of the Year – Solo – Cabin Fever	Nominated

=== Canadian Country Music Association Awards ===
==== Corb Lund Band ====
Year	Category	Result
2003	Roots Artist or Group of the Year	Nominated
2004	Group or Duo of the Year	Nominated
2004	Roots Artist or Group of the Year	Won
2004	Independent Group or Duo of the Year	Won
2005	Group or Duo of the Year	Nominated
2005	Roots Artist or Group of the Year	Won
2005	CMT Video of the Year – "Roughest Neck Around"	Nominated
2005	Independent Group or Duo of the Year	Won

==== Corb Lund ====
Year	Category	Result
2006	Male Artist of the Year	Nominated
2006	Roots Artist or Group of the Year	Won
2006	Album of the Year – Hair in My Eyes Like a Highland Steer	Won
2006	Independent Male Artist of the Year	Nominated
2007	Roots Artist or Group of the Year	Won
2007	Independent Male Artist of the Year	Nominated
2008	Roots Artist or Group of the Year	Won
2008	Top Selling Canadian Album of the Year – Horse Soldier! Horse Soldier!	Nominated
2009	Roots Artist or Group of the Year	Won
2010	Fans' Choice Award	Nominated
2010	Male Artist of the Year	Nominated
2010	Roots Artist or Group of the Year	Won
2010	Album of the Year – Losin' Lately Gambler	Nominated
2010	CMT Video of the Year – "Devil's Best Dress"	Nominated
2011	Roots Artist or Group of the Year	Nominated
2012	Roots Artist or Group of the Year	Nominated
2013	Roots Artist or Group of the Year	Won
2014	Roots Artist or Group of the Year	Nominated
2021	Alternative Country Album of the Year – Agricultural Tragic	Won
2022	Alternative Country Album of the Year - Songs My Friends Wrote	Won

=== Americana Music Honors & Awards ===
- 2010 Emerging Artist of the Year (nominated)
- 2010 Albums of the Year: No. 38

=== Gold Records ===
- 2002: Five Dollar Bill (As ranked by the Canadian Recording Industry Association)
- 2005: Hair in My Eyes Like a Highland Steer (As ranked by the Canadian Recording Industry Association)
- 2007: Horse Soldier! Horse Soldier! (As ranked by the Canadian Recording Industry Association)

=== Western Canadian Music Awards ===
- 2008 Outstanding Roots Recording (WON)
- 2006 Outstanding Independent Recording (WON)
- 2006 Outstanding Roots Recording (WON)
- 2006 Songwriter of the Year (WON)
- 2005 Entertainer of the Year (WON)
- 2003 Outstanding Album (Independent) (WON)
- 2017 Roots Solo Artist of the Year

=== Edmonton Music Awards (Canada) ===
- 2013 Male Artist of the Year (WON)
- 2013 Country Artist of the Year (WON)
- 2013 People's Choice Award (WON)
- 2013 Best Country Artist (nominated)

=== Edmonton Mayor's Celebration of the Arts Awards (Canada) ===
- 2013 Ambassador of the Arts (WON)

=== CMC Music Awards (Australia) ===
- 2011 International Artist of the Year (nominated)

=== Canadian Folk Music Awards ===
- 2008 English Songwriter of the Year (WON)

=== U.S. Independent Music Awards ===
- 2007 Best Folk/Singer-Songwriter Album (nominated)
- 2003 Country/Bluegrass Album of the Year (nominated)

=== Country Music Association (Australia) ===
- 2007 Global Country Artist Award (nominated)

=== Indie Acoustic Project ===
- Best Lyrics, "Best CDs of 2007" Awards (WON)
- Best Male Singer-Songwriter, "Best CDs of 2006" Awards (nominated)

=== The Indies (Canadian Independent Music Awards) ===
- 2008 Favourite Folk Artist/Group (WON)
- 2007 Favourite Country Artist, Group or Duo of the Year (WON)
- 2006 Favourite Folk Artist/Group (WON)

=== French Association of Country Music (France) ===
- 2006 Independent Artist of the Year (WON)
- 2005 Independent Artist of the Year (WON)

=== Canadian Association for Campus Activities ===
- 2007 Best Contemporary Music (Recording) (WON)

== Artist also appears on ==
=== 2005 ===
- Carolyn Mark – Just Married: An Album of Duets, "Sweet Thing", Mint

=== 2006 ===
- Various Artists – Untitled Promo CD PROC 515, "Hair In My Eyes Like A Highland Steer", Warner Music Canada
- Various Artists – Slither: Music from the Motion Picture, "(Gonna) Shine Up My Boots", Bulletproof Recording Company Inc.
- Various Artists – 30 Years of Stony Plain, "The Truth Comes Out", Stony Plain Records
- Various Artists – Worlds Best Award Winning Country Vol. 5- World's Best Award Winning Country CD, "Truck Got Stuck", Pid

=== 2007 ===
- Various Artists – Gift: A Tribute to Ian Tyson, "MC Horses", Stony Plain Records

=== 2009 ===
- Various Artists – AB2 Alberta's Playlist, "A Leader On Losing Control", Alberta Foundation For The Arts

=== 2010 ===
- Great Canadian Song Quest, "The West Just Fades Away", CBC Radio 2
- Various Artists – The Americana Music Association, "Devil's Best Dress", Red Ink

=== 2011 ===
- Various Artists – Have Not Been The Same Volume One: Too Cool To Live, Too Smart To Die, "In Contempt Of Me", Zunior Records

=== 2013 ===
- Various Artists – Festival Man: Truly Great Artists Playing Geoff Berner's Songs, "That's What Keeps The Rent Down", Dundurn

=== 2014 ===
- Various Artists – An Americana Christmas, "Just Me And These Ponies (For Christmas This Year)", New West Records

== Charity work ==
In March 2008, the United Nations Children's Fund announced that the band had donated the use of the song "Horse Soldier, Horse Soldier" as the theme song of UNICEF Team Canada, the Canadian national equestrian skill-at-arms team, to support the team's work with UNICEF to provide food and medical care to AIDS orphans and infants infected with HIV in the global south.

In March 2010, Lund appeared as part of Young Artists for Haiti to record a benefit version of K'naan's song "Wavin' Flag".

On July 11, 2010, Lund headlined the Medicine Hat Flood Relief Show, which raised $68,000 for Canadian Red Cross 2010 Flood Relief campaign, which benefits those affected by the disastrous flooding in Southern Alberta.

Lund has supported the Centre for Family Literacy in Edmonton, Alberta since 2010.

Lund participated in the 2013 Alberta Flood Relief Concert at the Calgary McMahon Stadium. The concert raised at least $1.5 million for flood relief.

Lund co-hosted and headlined the "Fire Aid" benefit concert supporting victims of the Fort McMurray wildfire at Edmonton's Commonwealth Stadium in 2016.

In 2021, Lund publicly expressed opposition to proposed coal mines in the foothills of the Rocky Mountains, citing concerns of fellow southern Alberta ranchers about possible water pollution. In June 2021, Lund held a small benefit concert in support of landowners. In 2025 Lund submitted a Citizen Initiative proposal to ban coal mining in the eastern slopes of the Rocky Mountains.
