= Hair in My Eyes Like a Highland Steer =

Studio album by Corb Lund and the Hurtin' Albertans
- Released: September 6, 2005
- Genre: Roots/Country/Blues
- Length: 45:21
- Label: Stony Plain Records, Loose Music
- Producer: Harry Stinson

Corb Lund and the Hurtin' Albertans chronology
| Five Dollar Bill (2002) | Hair in My Eyes Like a Highland Steer (2005) | Horse Soldier! Horse Soldier! (2007) |

Hair in My Eyes Like a Highland Steer is the fourth album by Corb Lund and the Hurtin' Albertans, released in 2005. The album was certified gold and named Album of the Year by the Canadian Country Music Association in 2006.

The song "Always Keep an Edge on Your Knife" was prominently featured in the 2014 Canadian horror film, Backcountry.

== Track listing ==
All songs written by Corb Lund, except "Hurtin' Albertan," which Lund co-wrote with Tim Hus.

1. Hair in My Eyes Like a Highland Steer - 2:56
2. Truck Got Stuck - 2:58
3. Always Keep an Edge on Your Knife - 3:16
4. The Rodeo's Over (with Ian Tyson) - 3:22
5. Hurtin' Albertan (with Tim Hus) - 4:41
6. Big Butch Bass Bull Fiddle - 2:13
7. All I Wanna Do is Play Cards - 4:00
8. Truth Comes Out - 3:28
9. Counterfeiters' Blues - 3:24
10. Good Copenhagen - 3:25
11. Trouble in the Country - 3:06
12. Little Foothills Heaven - 2:57
13. The Truck Got Stuck Talkin' Blues (featuring Ramblin' Jack Elliott) - 5:35

== Notes ==
In 2007, folk artist Geoff Berner released a free MP3 download on his website, entitled "Don't Play Cards for Money with Corby Lund", presumably a humorous response to this album's "All I Wanna Do is Play Cards".
