= Horse Soldier! Horse Soldier! =

Studio album by Corb Lund and the Hurtin' Albertans
- Released: November 13, 2007
- Genre: Roots/country/blues
- Length: 47:27
- Label: Stony Plain Records
- Producer: Harry Stinson

Corb Lund and the Hurtin' Albertans chronology
Hair in My Eyes Like a Highland Steer (2005)	Horse Soldier! Horse Soldier! (2007)	Losin' Lately Gambler (2009)

Singles from Horse Soldier! Horse Soldier!
- 1. "I Wanna Be in the Cavalry" Released: September 24, 2007; 2. "Family Reunion" Released: February 2008; 3. "Horse Soldier, Horse Soldier" Released: October 27, 2008; 4. "Hard on Equipment (Tool for the Job)" Released: January 2009

Horse Soldier! Horse Soldier! is the fifth studio album by Corb Lund and the Hurtin' Albertans. It was released on Stony Plain Records on November 13, 2007.

== Track listing ==
All tracks are written by Corb Lund except where noted

No.	Title	Writer(s)	Length
1.	"I Wanna Be in the Cavalry"	Lund, Stan Rogers	3:09
2.	"Horse Soldier, Horse Soldier"		5:12
3.	"Lament for Lester Cousins"		4:53
4.	"Brother Brigham, Brother Young"		4:09
5.	"The Horse I Rode in On"		3:51
6.	"A Leader on Losing Control"		3:21
7.	"Student Visas"		4:03
8.	"What That Song Means Now"		2:37
9.	"Hard on Equipment (Tool for the Job)"	Lund, Mike Plume	3:14
10.	"Family Reunion"		2:20
11.	"Especially a Paint"		2:36
12.	"Ciesla's Revenge (Intro)"		0:38
13.	"My Saddle Horse Has Died"	Lund, Dug Bevans, Michael Caldwell, Terry Johnson	3:07
14.	"I Wanna Be in the Cavalry Reprise"	Lund, Rogers	3:45
15.	"Taps"	traditional	0:32

== Chart performance ==
Chart (2007)	Peak position
Canadian Albums Chart	25

== Certifications ==
Region	Certification
Canada (Music Canada)	Gold
