= Dala (band) =

Canadian musical group

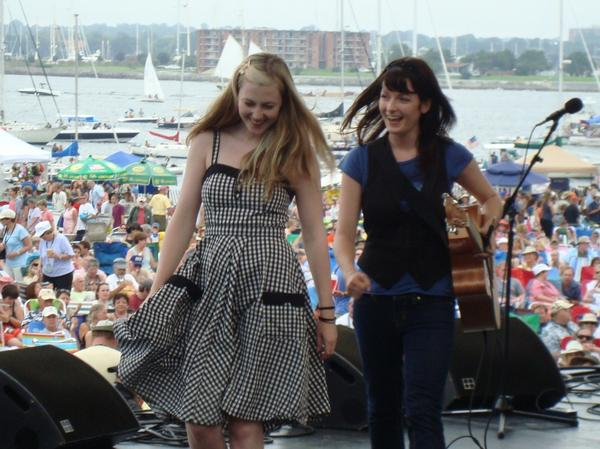
- Amanda Walther (left) and Sheila Carabine (right)

Background information
- Origin: Scarborough, Ontario, Canada
- Genres: Folk, Rock, Acoustic
- Years active: 2002-Present
- Labels: Big Bold Sun Music; Universal Music
- Members: Sheila Carabine; Amanda Walther
- Website: dalagirls.com

Dala is a Canadian acoustic-folk two-piece musical group, made up by Sheila Carabine and Amanda Walther, both of Scarborough, Ontario.

== Early history (2002–2005) ==
Sheila Carabine and Amanda Walther first met at Mary Ward Catholic Secondary School, at a high school band practice. Quickly after, Carabine and Walther's friendship blossomed and they formed Dala in the summer of 2002. Their "innate understanding of music" and "vocal range" helped propel them towards signing a five-year artist development deal with Big Bold Sun Music on December 12, 2003, and on April 3, 2005, Dala released their first album, This Moment Is a Flash.

== Universal Music then indie labels (2005–present) ==
On August 8, 2005, Dala signed its first major record deal with Universal Music. Soon thereafter, on November 1, the band released its first major album, Angels & Thieves, containing five original songs and five covers. Immediately afterwards, Dala went out on tour to support the album, including a brief stint in early 2007 opening for Tom Cochrane. Returning to the studio after the tour, the band released their album Who Do You Think You Are on August 14, 2007, with the lead single "Anywhere Under the Moon" entering MuchMoreMusic rotation. Dala finished opening for Matthew Good on a cross-Canada tour in Cobalt, Ontario on November 3, 2007.

In 2008, Dala joined Stuart McLean, the host of CBC Radio's Vinyl Cafe, for three separate Canadian tours. Other musical guests featured on these tours include Danny Michel and Russell deCarle.

Over the course of their career, Dala has contributed cover songs to several compilations. The Angels & Thieves recordings of "Dream a Little Dream of Me", The Cure's "Lovesong", and Neil Young's "A Man Needs a Maid" were released on Just Like Heaven - a tribute to The Cure (2009), Sing Me To Sleep - Indie Lullabies (2010), and Cinnamon Girl - Women Artists Cover Neil Young (2008) respectively. Cinnamon Girl also included the duo's cover of Young's "Ohio", which was recorded for the 2007 compilation Borrowed Tunes II: A Tribute to Neil Young.

The duo released their fourth album, Everyone Is Someone, on June 9, 2009. Lead single "Levi Blues" was nominated in the Mainstream Adult Contemporary category at the 2010 Canadian Radio Music Awards.

The duo taped a performance for PBS in February 2010, which aired in June as Girls from the North Country. The performance also featured Canadian all-girl acts The Good Lovelies and Oh Susanna, and included covers of songs by Joni Mitchell, Gordon Lightfoot, Leonard Cohen, Neil Young, and Bob Dylan. That year the band won Vocal Group of the Year at the Canadian Folk Music Awards.

In the spring of 2012, Dala released their fifth studio album, Best Day, which earned three Canadian Folk Music Award nominations for English Songwriter of the Year, Vocal Group of the Year, and Producer of the Year.

In between long breaks from recording, Amanda Walther and her brothers and cousins, as the WW Club, released a children's album More Better in June 2015. Sheila Carabine's solo album was planned for release in 2016.

== Discography ==
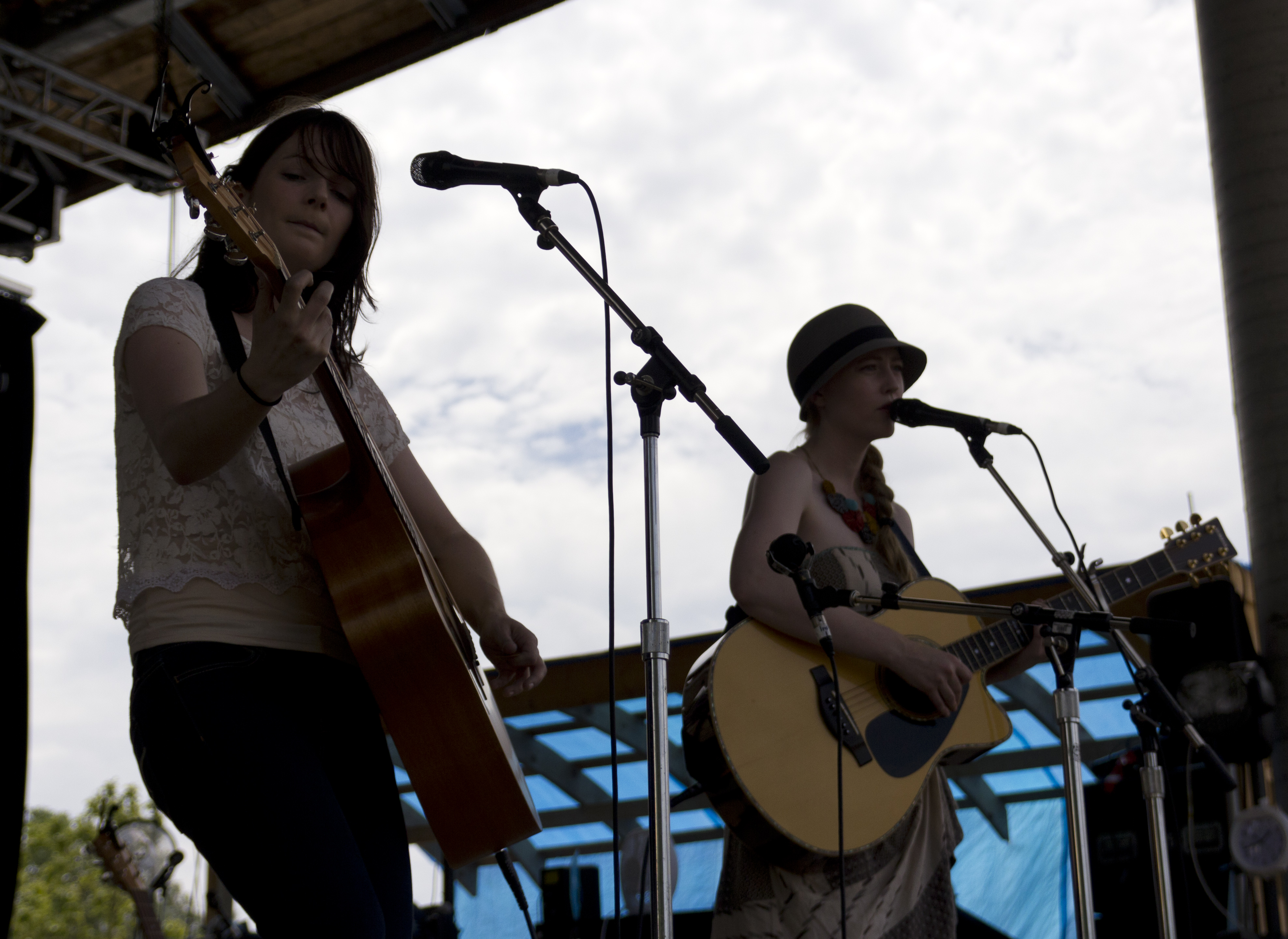
Dala performing at the 2011 Hillside Festival

=== Studio albums ===
Title	Record label	Release date
This Moment Is a Flash	Big Bold Sun Music	April 3, 2005
Angels & Thieves	Universal Music	November 1, 2005
Who Do You Think You Are	Universal Music	August 14, 2007
Everyone Is Someone	Campus Music/Lenz Entertainment	June 9, 2009
Best Day	Campus Music/Lenz Entertainment	May 29, 2012 (US); June 5, 2012 (CA)

=== Live albums ===
Title	Record label	Release date
Girls From the North Country	Lenz Entertainment	June 7, 2010

== Awards ==
=== Canadian Folk Music Awards ===
The Canadian Folk Music Awards have been awarded annually since 2005.

Year	Nominee / work	Award	Result
2006	Dala - Angels & Thieves	Best New/Emerging Artist	Nominated
2006	Mike Roth - Angels & Thieves	Producer of the Year	Won
2008	Dala - Who Do You Think You Are	Vocal Group of the Year	Nominated
2009	Dala - Everyone Is Someone	Vocal Group of the Year	Nominated
2009	Mike Roth - Everyone Is Someone	Producer of the Year	Nominated
2010	Dala - Girls from the North Country	Contemporary Album of the Year	Nominated
2010	Dala - Girls from the North Country	Vocal Group of the Year	Won
2012	Dala - Best Day	English Songwriter of the Year	Nominated
2012	Dala - Best Day	Vocal Group of the Year	Nominated
2012	Mike Roth - Best Day	Producer of the Year	Nominated

=== Toronto Independent Music Awards ===
The Toronto Independent Music Awards have been presented bi-annually since 2009

Year	Award	Result
2010	Best Folk Act	Won

=== Juno Awards ===
The Juno Awards have been presented annually since 1970 to Canadian musical artists and bands to acknowledge their artistic and technical achievements in all aspects of music.

Year	Nominee / work	Award	Result
2011	Dala - Girls from the North Country	Roots & Traditional Album of the Year – Group	Nominated
