= Pat Robitaille =

Canadian folk rock musician (born 1986)

- Born: March 15, 1986
- Origin: Windsor, Ontario, Canada
- Genres: Folk rock
- Years active: 2005–present
- Labels: None
- Members: Pat Robitaille

Pat Robitaille (born 1986) is a Canadian folk rock musician.

== Early life ==
Robitaille was born and raised in Windsor, Ontario, Canada. He grew up listening to the Motown soul and gospel music from bordering Detroit, Michigan.

He was given his first guitar when he was 11 years old. Despite being close to graduation, he left high school at age 16 to focus on his music career.

== Career ==
Robitaille has independently released four full-length albums and several EPs. One of his music videos reached the #1 spot on MuchMoreMusic's Daily Top 10 countdown. He has played hundreds of shows, performed at the Mariposa Folk Festival and the Hillside Festival.

His first record sold about 10,000 copies. He released his second album, Summer of Love, in 2007. The Windsor Star's reviewer called him "raw talent in the making", and wrote, "at the root of each song is a guy and his guitar, and Robitaille has the smoky voice and sense of melody to hold your attention."

In September 2008, he released Two Forty Eight (the title comes from his house address) to a strong consensus of positive reviews. He recorded the album at home, using GarageBand.

His album Change was released in September 2010. Exclaim! magazine described it as "a well conceived, albeit poorly executed, collection of songs, featuring a man with a golden voice."

Robitaille took a break from his solo career in 2012, returning to his home town of Windsor, Ontario. Here he formed the band The Walkervilles (named after a neighbourhood of Windsor) with members of the folk band Michou. The Walkervilles include Robitaille on vocals and guitar, Mike Hargreaves on bass, and Stefan Cvetkovic on drums.

== Discography ==
=== Albums ===
- Acoustic EP (March 21, 2006)
- Summer of Love (June 5, 2007)
- Two Forty Eight (September 2008)
- Change (September 2010)
