= Romi Mayes =

- Born: 1975 (age 50–51); Winnipeg, Manitoba, Canada
- Genres: Roots music; blues; music
- Occupations: Singer, songwriter, Producer

Romi Mayes is a Canadian roots and blues guitarist and a singer songwriter starting in the 1990s.

She is a Juno nominated, CFMA nominated, 7 time Western Canadian Music Awards winner. Mayes is the CEO and Event Producer for her company Sure Shot Bookings that facilitates live music for Canadian corporate, community, and private events. www.sureshotbookings.com

== Styles ==
Raised on classic rock, blues, country, folk, bluegrass, 80s pop, and Motown, Romi Mayes' songwriting and guitar style is a conglomerate of all these styles.

== Awards and reviews ==
Juno nominated and 6 time Western Canadian Music Award winner for Songwriter of The Year, Album of The Year, Blues Artist of The Year.

== Discography ==
Solo albums

- 1997 - Off The Wagon (Mayes was a member of this band)
- 2002 - On The Road in 2 Days
- 2004 - Mayes and Carmichael
- 2005 - The Living Room Sessions Volume 1 (Romi Mayes and the Temporarily Unemployed)
- 2006 - Sweet Somethin' Steady
- 2009 - Achin' In Your Bones
- 2011 - Lucky Tonight
- 2015 - Devil On Both Shoulders
- 2024 - Small Victories (produced by Mayes)

Compilation albums

- 2004 - Guess Who's Home (Hand Me Down World)
- 2006 - High Roads
- 2006 - High Water Everywhere
- 2006 - The Life and Times of Christian Banks
- 2006 - Don't You Think We Should Be Closer
- 2006 - Comin' Home Soon
- 2007 - Beverley Street - The Songs of David Essig (Romi Mayes and The D.Rangers)
- 2007 - Let'R Buck
- 2009 - Where Great Oaks Grow
