= Mike Roth =

Mike Roth, originally from Northampton, Massachusetts, is an A&R man.

He is notable for discovering and developing numerous famous Canadian bands including Our Lady Peace, Chantal Kreviazuk, Amanda Marshall, The Philosopher Kings, Prozzäk, Junkhouse, Hemingway Corner, Edwin, and Dala among others.

Formerly a senior VP of the Canadian division of Sony Music Entertainment, Roth has since founded his own music company, "Big Bold Sun Music" in 2003.

Under this company, he has signed three new bands to his label for development, which include: folk-rock musician Pat Robitaille, singer and dancer Andreja, and the acoustic-folk duo Dala, recently signed to a major label deal by Universal Music.
