= Chicago Maritime Festival =

Annual festival in Chicago, Illinois, US

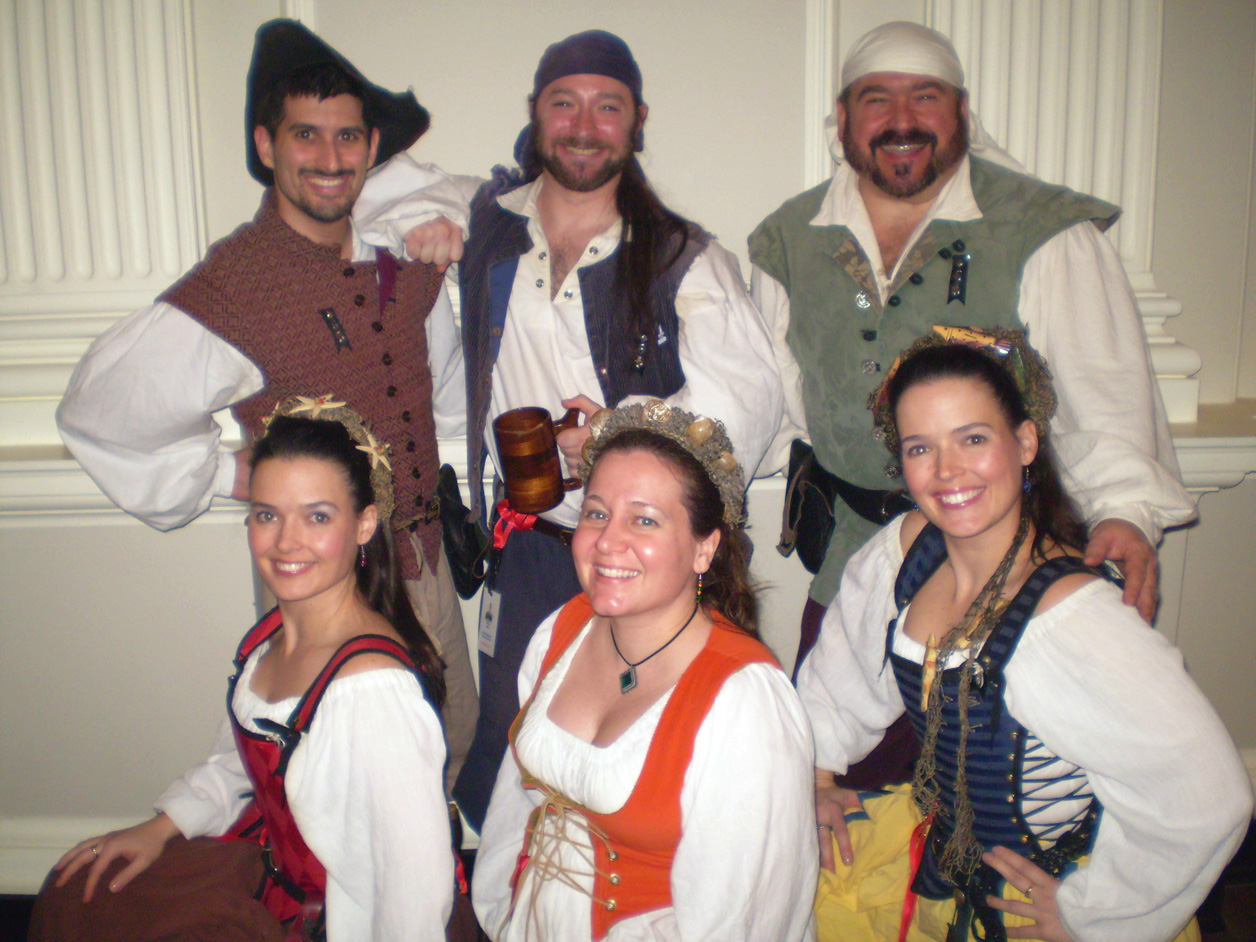
- Bounding Main at Chicago Maritime Festival in 2009
- Genre: Maritime music
- Dates: February
- Location: Chicago, Illinois
- Years active: 2003–2020, 2022–present
- Founders: Tom & Chris Kastle
- Website: Chicago Maritime Festival official website

The Chicago Maritime Festival is a maritime music and culture festival held in Chicago, Illinois, every winter, usually the last weekend in February, usually at the Chicago History Museum. It is not uncommon for over 500 people to participate. It has existed in its present incarnation since 2003 and is the only wintertime festival featuring maritime music in the United States. The main organizers are performers Tom and Chris Kastle.

== List of musical performers at Chicago Maritime Festival ==
=== 2003 ===
- Kat yn 't Seil
- Johnny Collins
- John Conolly
- 97th Regimental String Band
- Mlynn
- Tom & Chris Kastle

=== 2004 ===
- Don Sineti
- Tom Lewis
- Bob Zentz
- The Johnson Girls
- Tom & Chris Kastle
- Lanialoha Lee
- David H.B. Drake
- Bounding Main
- Sheridan Shore Chantey Singers
- Old Town School of Folk Music Sea Music Class

=== 2005 ===
- Pint & Dale
- Serre l'Ecoute
- Talitha MacKenzie
- Lee Murdock
- Tom & Chris Kastle
- David H.B. Drake
- Bounding Main
- Sheridan Shore Chantey Singers
- Friends Good Will Singers
- Old Town School of Folk Music Sea Music Class

=== 2006 ===
(Held at the Latin School of Chicago due to remodeling at the History Museum)

- The Boekaneirs
- David H.B. Drake
- John Townley
- Nanne Kalma & Ankie van der Meer
- Tom & Chris Kastle

=== 2007 ===
- Bounding Main
- Jerry Bryant
- Johnny Collins
- Philippe Duo (Philippe Noriel and Philippe Rouxel)
- Tom & Chris Kastle

=== 2008 ===
- Northern Neck Chantey Singers
- Debra Cowan
- Walter "Salty Walt" Askew
- Holdstock & MacLeod
- Tom & Chris Kastle

=== 2009 ===
- Dan Milner
- David Coffin
- The Johnson Girls
- Patrick Denain and Miguel Biard
- Tom & Chris Kastle
- Bounding Main
- Old Town School of Folk Music Sea Music Class

=== 2010 ===
- Caryl P. Weiss
- John Roberts
- Rick Spencer
- The 97th Regimental String Band
- Tom and Chris Kastle
- Old Town School of Folk Music Sea Music Class

=== 2011 ===
- Bob Walser
- Cindy Kallet
- Pint and Dale
- Belize Culture and Heritage Association
- Great Lakes Navy Band
- Tom and Chris Kastle

== See also ==
- List of maritime music festivals
- Maritime music
