= List of maritime music performers =

This is a list of performers who focus on maritime music or who have at some point made notable contributions to that genre.

== Traditional-style performers ==
- Jerry Bryant, singer-songwriter from Maine, also performs historical shanties in a traditional style.
- David Coffin, from Gloucester, Massachusetts, leader of Revels music group in Cambridge.
- Johnny Collins, a modern-day shantyman (1938–2009)
- Forebitter, group featuring performers associated with the Mystic Seaport Museum
- Stan Hugill, "Last Working Shantyman" (1906–1992)
- The Idlers, an all-male a cappella shanty group at the United States Coast Guard Academy (1957–present)
- The Johnson Girls, an all-female shanty group from New York
- Tom and Chris Kastle, singer-songwriters from Chicago, also perform historical shanties in a traditional style
- Tom Lewis, Canadian singer-songwriter, also performs historical shanties in a traditional style
- Northern Neck Shanty Singers, a menhaden shanty group, some of whom learned the songs as work songs on fishing boats when they were young men
- Roberts and Barrand, proponents of traditional British song from New York and New England (1969-)
- Salty Walt & the Rattlin' Ratlines, from San Francisco

== Folk music-style performers ==
- Peter Bellamy, British folk singer; wrote "Roll Down" (aka "Transports Shanty") (1944–1981)
- Debra Cowan, sea music performer from Shrewsbury, Massachusetts
- Roger McGuinn, from Chicago
- William Pint and Felicia Dale, from Seattle
- Bob Roberts, British Merchant Seaman and folk singer (1907–1982)
- Stan Rogers, Canadian performer; wrote "Barrett's Privateers" (1949–1983)
- Cyril Tawney, British performer (1930–2005)
- John Townley, also known for opening the first 12-track recording studio in New York, Apostolic Recording Studio
- Bob Zentz
- Stompin' Tom Connors
- Alan Mills, Canadian performer, folk singer, writer and actor, best known for multiple recording on Folkways Records including "Songs of the Sea" recorded in 1959 (1913–1977)

== Contemporary-style performers ==
- Banana Boat, an a cappella sextet from Poland performing "neo-shanties" as well as traditional sea-shanties in contemporary arrangements
- Bounding Main, an a cappella quintet based near Kenosha, Wisconsin
- Captain Bogg and Salty, a pirate-themed rock band which performs many traditional shanties, as well as writing several of their own
- Great Big Sea, Canadian band performing some shanties in traditional style

== See also ==
- Sea in culture#In music
- Sea shanty
- Folk music
- List of maritime music festivals
