= Mystic Seaport Sea Music Festival =

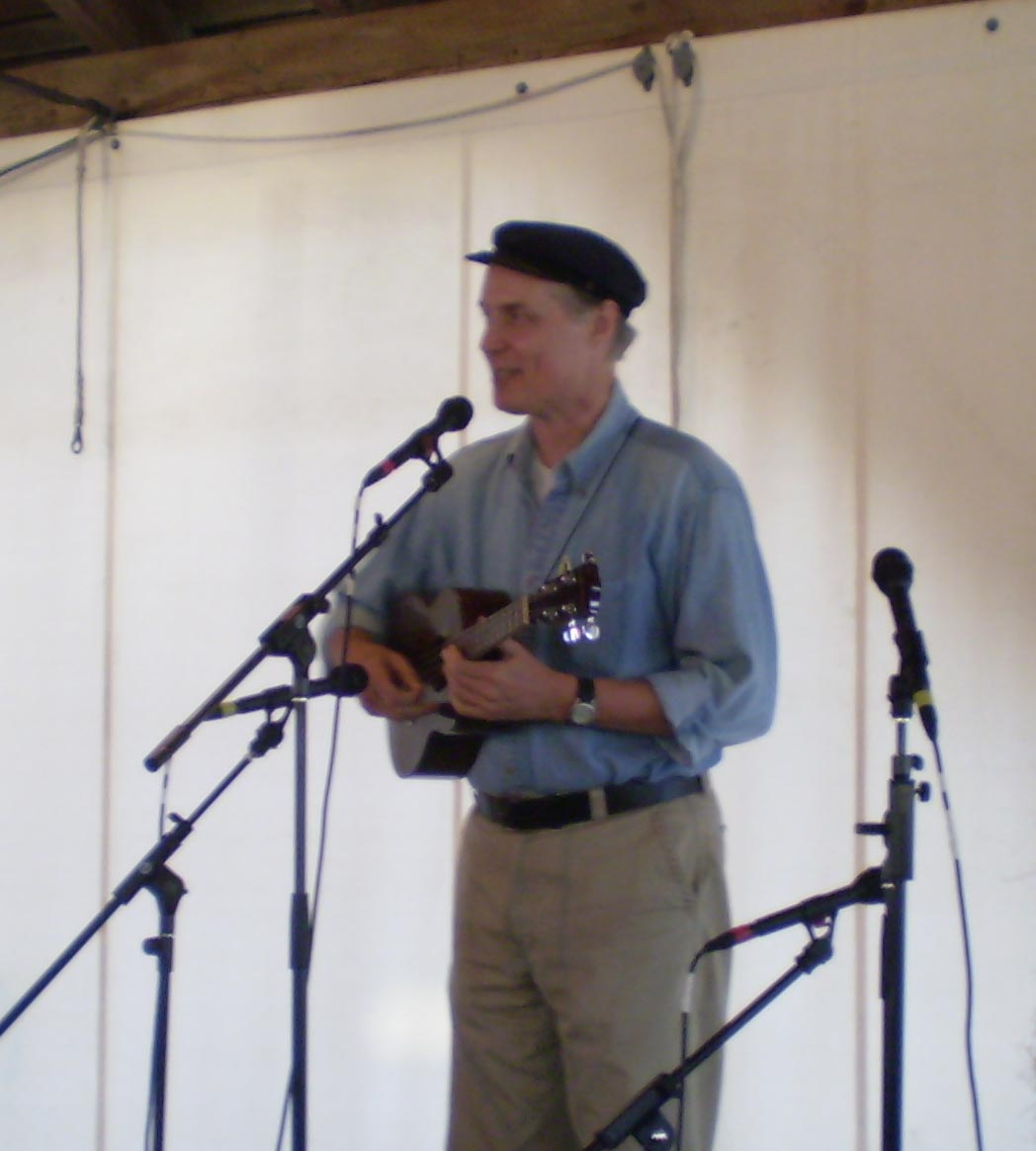
- Jerry Bryant performing at the Sea Music Festival 2009
- Genre: Maritime music
- Dates: June
- Location: Mystic Seaport Museum in Mystic, Connecticut
- Years active: 1980-2019
- Founders: Dr. Stuart M. Frank

The Mystic Seaport Sea Music Festival, held annually in June from 1980 to 2019 at the Mystic Seaport Museum in Mystic, Connecticut, was among the oldest, and was the largest sea music festival in the United States. It reportedly attracted "the highest caliber of sea music performers, scholars, and fans." The Festival was first organized by Dr. Stuart M. Frank as a place to perform and hear sea music as well as a symposium for ethnomusicologists, anthropologists, and historians.

== List of Performers ==
=== 1989 (10th) ===
- Ancient Mariners
- Jerry Bryant
- Cabestan
- Jon Campbell and Joe Houlihan
- Ellen Cohn
- Bob Crowley
- Tony Davis
- Stuart Frank and Mary Malloy
- John R "Joli" Goncalves
- Tom Goux & Jacek Sulanowski
- Cliff Haslam
- Dick Holdstock and Allan MacLeod
- Stan Hugill
- Cindy Kallet
- Wickford Express
- Bob Webb
- Jeff Warner and Jeff Davis
- Bob Walser
- John Townley
- Dick Swain
- Stephan Sanfillippo
- William Pint
- Daisy Nell and David Coffin
- Tom Lewis
- Louis Killen
- Mystic Seaport Chanteymen

=== 1999 (20th) ===
Source: "Festival To Flow With Talent". Source: "Sea Music Morning, Noon And Night". Source: "Anthologies: Mystic Seaport Sea Music Festival".

- Ancient Mariners
- Armand Hayet Winners
- Black Bush
- Bruce MacIntyre
- Cathy Barton and Dave Para
- Cliff Haslam
- The Ebony Hillbillies
- Ellen Cohn
- Forebitter
- James "Sparky"Rucker
- Jeff Warner
- Louis Killen
- Mainbrace
- Mike Seeger
- MSM Chantymen
- Ti Jardin
- The Windlasses

=== 2000 (21st) ===
Source: "Anthologies: Mystic Seaport Sea Music Festival".

- Bill Harlet
- Compass Rose
- Finest Kind (Don Sinetti, Bill Walach, Jerry Bryant, Gary Buttery, Steve Royce)
- Forebitter
- Jay Ungar & Molly Mason
- John Roberts and Tony Barrand
- Lee Murdock
- Liereliet
- Louis Killen
- Mamadou Diabate
- Maree de Paradis
- Mystic Seaport Chantey Singers
- Next Tradition
- Tom Lewis

=== 2001 (22nd) ===
Source: "Anthologies: Mystic Seaport Sea Music Festival".

- Bob Walser
- Celeste Bernardo
- Cliff Haslam
- Cindy Kallet
- Dave Littlefield
- Dick Swain
- Forebitter
- Geoff Kaufman
- Jeff Davis
- The Johnson Girls
- Ken Sweeney
- Liam Clancy
- Louis Killen
- Magpie
- Martin Hugill
- Matapat
- Robbie O'Connell
- Shipping News
- Steve Sanfilippo

=== 2003 (24th) ===
Source: "Anthologies: Mystic Seaport Sea Music Festival".

- Anita Best & Pamela Morgan
- Bill Stevens
- Craig Edwards
- Don Sineti
- Danny Spooner
- Forebitter
- Georgia Sea Island Singers
- Hoolie
- Marc Bernier
- The Next Tradition
- Nic Gareiss & Tim Reilly
- Robbie O'Connell
- Rum Soaked Crooks
- Skip Healy
- Tom Lewis
- Ye Mariners All

=== 2004 (25th) ===
Source: 25th Annual Sea Music Festival (Media notes). Mystic Seaport.

- Bob Webb
- Celeste Bernardo
- Cliff Haslam
- Compass Rose
- David Littlefield
- Dick & Carol Holdstock
- Dick Holdstock & Allan MacLeod
- Geoff Kauffman
- Georgia Sea Island Singers
- John Roberts
- Jorge Job
- Ken Sweeney
- Le Vent du Nord
- Louis Killen
- The Johnson Girls
- Tommy Makem
- William Pint & Felicia Dale

=== 2006 (27th) ===
Source: "Mudcat Cafe".

- Len Cabral
- John Campbell
- Debra Cowan
- Jeff Davis
- Cliff Haslam
- Ida Red
- Ilsha
- Danny O'Flaherty
- Dan Milner and Bob Conroy
- Bob Walser
- Bob Webb
- Sule Greg Wilson
- Brian Peters
- Roll and Go
- Rick Spencer
- Three Sheets to the Wind

=== 2007 (28th) ===
Source: "Title unknown" (PDF). Mystic Seaport. Archived from the original (PDF) on June 11, 2011.

- Ana Vinagre
- Bob Walser
- Bob Webb
- Bonnie Milner
- Bruce MacIntyre
- Chanteens
- Chanterelle
- Chris Koldewey
- Cindy Kallet
- Cliff Haslam
- Craig Edwards
- David Littlefield
- Don Sineti
- Ellen Cohn
- Geno Leech
- Geoff Kauffman
- Gianna Iannucci
- Jeff Warner
- Jerry Bryant
- John Bartlett & Ricka Ruebsaat
- Ken Sweeney
- Kenny Wolin
- Lee Murdock
- Louis Killen
- Marc Bernier
- Moe Bowstern
- Northern Neck Chanteymen
- Rachel Thomas
- Rick Spencer
- Steve Roys
- Tim Reilly
- Tom Lewis
- William Pint & Felicia Dale

=== 2008 (29th) ===
Source: "Music in the Air" (PDF). Archived from the original (PDF) on October 2, 2016.

- Barnacle
- Bob Webb
- Bob Zentz
- Calico Jack
- Charlie Ipcar
- Cliff Haslam
- Danny O'Flaherty
- Danny & Joyce McLeod
- Finest Kind
- George Ward
- Hand in Hand
- Jeff Davis
- Johnson Girls
- Mystic Seaport's Chantey Staff
- Robbie O'Connell
- Sheri Mortimer
- Trout Bas

=== 2009 (30th) ===
Source: "Meet Past Sea Music Festival Performers". Mystic Seaport. Archived from the original on 2010-07-06.

- Barnacle
- Bob Walser
- Bob Webb
- Carl Thornton
- Cliff Haslam
- Daisy Nell & Stan Collinson
- Danny Spooner
- Dave Peloquin
- David Kleiman
- Heather Wood
- Ellen Cohn
- Dick Holdstock & Allan MacLeod
- Jeff Warner
- Jerry Bryant
- John Roberts
- Judy & Dennis Cook
- Louis Killen
- Marc Bernier
- Martin & Phillip Hugill
- Nanne Kalma and The Hudson Crew
- New Bedford Harbor Sea Chantey Chorus
- Rick Nestler
- Rum Soaked Crooks
- Sheri Mortimer
- Stout
- Stuart Frank & Mary Malloy
- Talitha MacKenzie
- Les Bouthilliers
- The Ancient Mariners
- The Clancy Legacy
- Walter Askew

=== 2010 (31st) ===
The Jovial Crew

=== 2011 (32nd) ===
Source: "Mystic Seaport to Host Annual Sea Music Festival".

- ARRR
- Bob Webb
- Brian Peters
- Caryl P. Weiss
- Celeste Bernardo
- The Chanteens
- Danny Spooner
- David Stone
- Jack Dalton
- Jeff Davis
- John Roberts
- Judy Cook
- Kapriol!
- Ken Sweeney
- Margaret McCandless
- Martin and Shan Graebe
- Northern Neck Chantey Singers
- Raizes
- Richard Grainger
- Rick Spencer
- Robbie O'Connell and Dan Milner with Jeanne Freeman and Benedict Gagliardi
- Roll and Go
- Tom Kastle

=== 2012 (33rd) ===
Source: "Mystic Seaport to Host 33rd Annual Sea Music Festival". 24 May 2012.

- Calico Jack
- Finest Kind
- FUNI from Reykjavik, Iceland
- Lee Murdock
- The Morgans
- Mystic Seaport Chantey Staff
- Rick Spencer
- S.S. Chanteens
- Tom Lewis
- Yankee Frolics

=== 2013 (34th) ===
Source: "2013 Mystic Sea Music Festival Coming Up".

- AcquAria (Sicily)
- Danny Spooner
- Jerry Bryant
- Kapriol’! (Netherlands)
- OCEAN Celtic
- Mystic Seaport Chantey Staff (Craig Edwards, Jesse Edwards, David Iler, Geoff Kaufman, Barry Keenan, Denise Kegler, David Littlefield, Don Sineti, and Chris Koldewey)
- Sara Grey and Kieron Means
- Sasiedzi (“the Neighbors”) (Poland)
- Tim Radford

=== 2014 (35th) ===
Source: "Mudcat Cafe".

- Ana Vinagre
- Barrouallie Whalers
- Bob Walser
- Celeste Bernardo
- Chris Kastle
- Dan McKinnon
- Dan Milner & Robbie O'Connell with Jeanne Freeman and Benedict Gagliardi
- Dave Peloquin
- Dave Webber & Annie Fentiman
- Dick & Carol Holdstock
- Don Sineti
- Forebitter
- Jack Dalton
- John Roberts
- The Johnson Girls
- Ken Sweeney
- Larry Kaplan
- Margaret McCandless
- Nanne Kalma, Ankie Van Der Meer, and Tseard Nauta
- The S.S..Chanteens
- Winston "Jeggae" Hoppie

=== 2015 (36th) ===
Source: "Event of the Week: 36th Annual Sea Music Festival".

- Alan Reid with Rob van Sante
- Cathy Barton & Dave Para
- Charlie Zahm
- George Ward
- Ian Bell
- Jackson Gillman
- Jeff Warner
- Jordan Shapiro’s Shanty Shakedown
- Judy Cook
- MARA (Brigitte Kloareg, Katell Kloareg and Yuna Léon)
- Maurice Leyden & Jane Cassidy
- Meridian (Olivia Gale & Colin de la Barre)
- Mystic Seaport Chantey Staff (Craig Edwards, Jesse Edwards, David Iler, Geoff Kaufman, Barry Keenan, Denise Kegler, David Littlefield, Don Sineti, and Chris Koldewey)
- Northern Neck Chanteymen
- Pressgang Mutiny
- Sara Grey & Keiron Means

=== 2016 (37th) ===
Source: "Sea Music Festival Performance Schedule" (PDF).

- Aunt Sallie’s Band
- Barrule
- Bob Walser
- Bob Zentz
- Brien Bradley
- Bror Okerblom
- Castelbay
- Chris Foldaway
- Cliff Haslam
- David Jones
- Fred Gosbee
- Heather Wood
- John Doyle
- Jon Campbell
- Julia Lane
- Kieran Jordan Dance
- Kieth Kendrick & Sylvia Needham
- Kim & Reggie Harris
- Magpie
- Margaret McCandless
- Matthew Byrne
- Moe Bowstern
- Mystic Seaport Chantey Staff (Craig Edwards, David Iler, Geoff Kaufman, Barry Keenan, Denise Kegler, David Littlefield, Don Sineti, and Chris Koldewey)
- Nanne Kalma & Ankie van der Meer
- Pressgang Mutiny
- Richard Grainger
- Spitzer & Mareva
- Tim Radford

== See also ==
- List of maritime music festivals
- Maritime music
