= Morrigan (disambiguation) =

The Morrígan is a figure from Irish mythology.

Morrigan may also refer to:

== Fictional characters ==
- Morrigan Aensland, in the Darkstalkers video game series
- Morrigan (Dragon Age), in the Dragon Age video game series
- Morrigan (Stargate), in the Stargate SG-1 series
- Morrigan, in the Southern Knights comic book
- The 'Morrigan, Shay Patrick Cormac's ship in Assassin's Creed Rogue

== Other uses ==
- Morrigan (band), an American traditional music group
- Morrigan (drag queen), Thai drag queen
