= Johnny Collins =

English folk singer

- Born: 10 May 1938; Norfolk, England
- Died: 6 July 2009 (aged 71); Gdańsk, Poland
- Occupation: Folk singer

Johnny Collins (10 May 1938 – 6 July 2009) was an English folk singer who specialised in traditional maritime music and sea shanties.

== Biography ==
Collins was born in Norfolk, England and adopted by a railway worker and a music teacher living in Norwich. He joined the British Army in 1956, where he learned to play the guitar in jazz and folk clubs while posted in London. He was posted to Singapore in 1959 where he began performing in bars and cabarets in his off hours, and was posted to Hong Kong in 1965 where he performed in large concerts with other folk performers in the British and U.S. military.

He also performed on television and radio (including the "Voice of America in East Asia") and played venues like the Hong Kong Hilton. In 1967 he was posted again to Singapore where he began his own folk club at the Anophel Inn. Tom Lewis and Pam Ayres performed there, among others. He was demobilized ("demobbed") in 1968, and he began to perform full-time.

In 1983 he and Jim Mageean, performing as a duo, won the Intervision Song Contest in Rostock, in East Germany. Later, in 1987, they were invited by the East German government to perform at a sea shanty festival in Berlin commemorating the city's founding.

Collins and his business partner Joyce Squires, assisted by Bernard Peek ran The Singing Chef. This service provided a wide range of home-cooked food at smaller folk-festivals throughout the UK. On occasions Collins sang on-stage wearing his chef's toque supported by backing singers (The Cheffettes) drawn from his kitchen brigade.

Although slowed down by health problems, Collins continued to tour and perform worldwide up to the time of his death. This included the Netherlands, Belgium, Germany, Poland and France as well as making frequent appearances in his native country at Cutty Sark Tall Ships Races, and maritime festivals at Hull, Lancaster, Bristol, Dundee, Maldon, Portsmouth, Gosport, Greenwich and Chatham.

== Death ==
He died on 6 July 2009 while on tour in Gdańsk, Poland, aged 71.

== Partial discography ==
- Traveller's Rest (1973)
- Johnny's Private Army (1975)
- Make the Rafters Roar (1979) with Jim Mageean
- Free and Easy (1982)
- Live at Herga! (1982) with Jim Mageean
- Strontrace (1983) with Jim Mageean
- Pedlar of Songs (1993)
- Coming of Age (1996)
- Shanties and Songs of the Sea (1996)
- Now & Then (2000)
- Good Times (2008) with Graeme Knights and Jim Mageean
