= Gordon Bok =

American folk singer and folklorist (b. 1939)

- Born: October 31, 1939 (age 86); Pennsylvania, US
- Genres: folk
- Occupation: Singer-songwriter
- Instruments: Vocals, guitar
- Labels: Folk-Legacy Records, Timberhead Music
- Website: http://www.gordonbok.com

Gordon Bok (born October 31, 1939) is an American folklorist and singer-songwriter, who grew up in Camden, Maine and is associated with music from New England.

== Career ==
Bok's first album, self-titled, was produced by Noel Paul Stookey (Paul of Peter, Paul, and Mary) and released in 1965 on the Verve Records' Verve Folkways subsidiary. His second album, A Tune for November, was released on Sandy Paton's Connecticut-based Folk-Legacy label in 1970. His association with Folk-Legacy has continued since that time, though his more recent work (from the early 1990s on) has been released on his own label, Timberhead Music. Some of his best-known work was done as part of a trio with Ed Trickett and Ann Mayo Muir, Trickett accompanying with the hammered dulcimer and guitar and Muir with the harp and flute.

Bok is a deep bass and plays six-string guitar (both the steel-string acoustic guitar and the nylon-string classical guitar) and 12-string guitar. He also plays a self-built instrument he calls the "cellamba," a six-string, fretted cello.

As a songwriter, Bok draws on his experience in and around the working boat culture of the Gulf of Maine. His lyrics include stories of fishermen and other sea-folk. At times (especially in the 1970s), he reaches into the wealth of sea myth of the North Atlantic.

In addition to writing songs, he is also a folklorist and gatherer of songs. His repertoire includes contemporary songs from North America, Australia, and the British Isles. Additionally, Bok sings, in the original languages, folksongs from Italy, Portugal, Mongolia, French Canada, Latin America, and the Hebrides, among other places, and knows a huge body of old anglophone folklore.

Bok is also an artist mainly dealing with sea themes done in wood carvings.

== Personal life ==
Bok is the grandson of Edward Bok, the son of Cary W. Bok, the nephew of Curtis Bok, the cousin of Derek Bok, and the uncle of Gideon Bok. He is married to Carol Rohl.

== Discography ==
=== Works alone and with friends ===
- Gordon Bok (1965)
- A Tune for November (1970)
- Peter Kagan and the Wind (1971)
- Seal Djiril's Hymn (1972)
- Cold as a Dog and the Wind Northeast: The Spoken Ballads of Ruth Moore (1973)
- Clearwater (1974)
- Bay of Fundy (1975)
- Clearwater II (1977)
- Another Land Made of Water (1979)
- Jeremy Brown and Jeannie Teal (1981)
- A Rogue's Gallery of Songs for the 12-String (1983)
- Clear Away in the Morning (1983, a thematic compilation of previously released work)
- Ensemble (1988)
- The Play of the Lady Odivere (1989)
- Return to the Land (1990)
- Schooners (1992)
- North Wind's Clearing (1995, a thematic compilation of previously released work)
- Neighbors (1996, with Cindy Kallet)
- Gatherings (1998)
- In the Kind Land (1999)
- Dear to our Island (2001)
- Herrings in the Bay (2003)
- Apples in the Basket (2005)
- Gordon Bok in Concert (2006)
- Other Eyes (2010)
- Because You Asked (2012)
- Then & Now (2015)
- Together Again for the First Time (2017)
- Windcalling (2023)

=== Works with Ed Trickett and Ann Mayo Muir ===
- Turning Toward the Morning (1975)
- The Ways of Man (1978)
- A Water Over Stone (1980)
- All Shall Be Well Again (1983)
- Fashioned in the Clay (1985)
- Minneapolis Concert (live album, 1987)
- The First 15 Years (a 2-vol. comp. from earlier recordings, 1990)
- And So Will We Yet (1990)
- Language of the Heart (1994)
- Harbors of Home (1998)

=== Other appearances ===
- Ed Trickett, The Telling Takes Me Home
- Ed Trickett, Gently Down the Stream of Time
- Ann Mayo Muir, So Goes My Heart
- Margaret MacArthur, The Old Songs (1975)
- Anne Dodson, From Where I Sit
- Cindy Kallet, This Way Home
- The New Golden Ring, Five Days Singing
- The Quasimodal Chorus, The Songs of Jan Harmon
- Cathy Barton, Dave Para & the Paton Family, ′Twas on a Night Like This (A Christmas Legacy) (1989)
