= List of maritime music festivals =

List of maritime music festivals is a sortable incomplete list of regularly occurring festivals, throughout the world, which feature or which usually contain significant performances of maritime music, a style of folk music largely based on the sea shanty. This list may have some overlap with list of folk festivals and list of early music festivals.

Shanties had antecedents in the working chants of British and other national maritime traditions. They were notably influenced by songs of shanty repertoire borrowed from the contemporary popular music enjoyed by sailors, including minstrel music, popular marches, and land-based folk songs. The music has since appeared at early folk festivals, and by the late 1970s, the activities of enthusiasts and scholar-performers at places like the Mystic Seaport Museum (who initiated an annual Sea Music Festival in 1979) and the San Francisco Maritime Museum established sea music—inclusive of shanties, sea songs, and other maritime music—as a genre with its own circuit of festivals, record labels, performance protocol, and so on. Some of the performances may be held at maritime museums, in conjunction with boat shows or maritime festivals, or at other venues friendly to acoustic music.

The performances at festivals can take several forms, as shanty performances today reflect a range of musical approaches and tastes. There are performers who favor a "traditional" style, who often perform work songs a capella or only with light instrumentation typical of sailors (e.g. concertina). A great many of the performers of shanties do so in what might be distinguished as a "folk music" style, often accompanied by guitar and banjo. Still other performers come to shanties from backgrounds in pop, rock, or theatrical music, and perform in what may be called a "contemporary" style. Some shanties are performed in a "classical" choir style (like the Robert Shaw Chorale).

== Related lists and categories ==
The following lists may have some overlap:

- List of music festivals
- List of folk festivals
- List of early music festivals
- List of Celtic festivals

The following categories are related:

- Category:Music festivals
- Category:Maritime music festivals
- Category:Maritime music
- Category:Folk festivals

== Festivals by location ==
Location (country, city)	Time	Festival	Debut year	Associated organization(s)	Link
France, Paimpol		Festival du chant de marin	1989		
Germany, Stade	October, 3rd weekend	Stader Shantychor-Festival		Stade Aktuell GmbH	
Netherlands, Giethoorn	September	De Slag op 't Wiede			
Netherlands, Rotterdam	September, 1st week	International Shanty Festival			
Norway	June, 1st weekend	Langesund International Shantyfestival	1991		
Poland, Kraków	February	International Sea Songs Festival, "Shanties"	1981		
Liverpool	October first Weekend	Liverpool Sea Shanty Festival	2014	Shanty UK	
United Kingdom, Falmouth	June	Falmouth International Sea Shanty Festival		A fundraiser for the Royal National Lifeboat Institution	
United Kingdom, Brancaster Staithe	September	Brancaster Staithe Sea Shanty Festival	2021	A Sea Shanty Festival raising money for the local RNLI and Coast Watch	https://brancasterstaithe-shantyfest.co.uk/
United Kingdom, Harwich	October, 2nd weekend	Harwich Shanty Festival			
Ellesmere Port	Easter of each year	Ellesmere Port, Shanty UK, Gathering.	2011	Shanty UK	
Gloucester, Gloucestershire	27–29 May 2016	Gloucester Shanty Festival	2016	A fundraiser for the Severn Area Rescue Association providing Lifeboats on the River Severn	
United States, San Diego, California	July	Sea Chantey Festival		Maritime Museum of San Diego	
United States, Mystic, Connecticut	June, 2nd week	Annual Sea Music Festival	1979	Mystic Seaport	
United States, Portsmouth, New Hampshire	September, last weekend in	Portsmouth Maritime Music Festival	1999–present	Market Square, Portsmouth, NH	
United States, Chicago, Illinois	February, 4th week	Chicago History MuseumChicago Maritime Festival		Chicago History Museum	
Canada, Saint-Jean-Port-Joli, Quebec	3rd week of August	Fête des Chants de marins de Saint-Jean-Port-Joli	1998–present	La COFEC, Saint-Jean-Port-Joli, QC	http://chantsmarins.com/en/

== Festivals by date ==
The following table is a selection of the European event calendar remso.eu - Shanty- festivals with more than 4 performers (groups) only. All reported festival-events up from 3 groups you can find here: 2015, 2016, 2017, 2018, 2019, 2020. Click on date below to watch participants of that event and listen to some of their songs.

days 1st year	2017 yy/mm/dd	2018 yy/mm/dd	2019 yy/mm/dd	2020 yy/mm/dd	Festival Organizer	groups audience	Location (country, city)
February							
Fry-Sun	17/03/03-05		19/02/22-24		Deunen & Deinen deunendeinen.nl	16	NL-1600 Enkhuizen
May							
1 May 1999		18/05/01	19/05/01		Maritimer Frühschoppen; Shanty-Chor Eilshausen	05	D-32120 Hiddenhausen
Chr.Himmelfahrt; 1995	17/05/25	18/05/10	19/05/30		Friesischer Frühschoppen; Shanty-Chor "Die Luttermöwen"	05	D-33334 Gütersloh-Isselhorst
June							
Sat, Sun; 1993	17/06/03-04; 1. Juni-WE	18/06/01-03	19/05/30-02		Internat. Shanty-Festival-Seelze; Shanty-Chor-Lohnde	10; 2'500	D-30926 Seelze
Sun; 2000		18/06/03	19/06/02		Shantychorfestival; Shanty-Chor MK Kamen/Bergkamen	05	D-59192 Bergkamen
July							
Fry-Sun; 2013	17/06/30-02	18/07/06-08	19/07/05-07	20/06/26-28	Shanty-Festival Travemünde; Kulturbühne Travemünde gUG	38; 60'000	D-23570 Lübeck-Travemünde
Fry-Sun	17/06/30-02	18/06/29-01	19/07/05-07		Festival Maritim; Tourismus Service Großenbrode	12	D-23775 Großenbrode
August							
Fry-Sun; 1989	17/08/11-13	no	19/08/02-04	no	Festival du chant de marin Association "Festival du chant de marin"	160; 145'000	F-22500 Paimpol
October							
Sat, Sun	17/10/14,15	18/10/13,14	19/10/12,13		Stader Shantychor-Festival; Stade Marketing und Tourismus GmbH	17	D-21680 Stade

=== Outdated ===
2015 mm/dd	2016 mm/dd	2017 mm/dd	days 1st year	Festival Organizer	groups audience	Location (country, city)
February						
15/02/20	16/02/26-28		Fry-Sun	Deunen & Deinen deunendeinen.nl	16	Netherlands, Enkhuizen
	16/02/25-28		Thu-Sun; 1981	Intern. Sailors' Songs Festival; Krakowska Fundacja .. "HALS"		Poland, Kraków
March						
15/04/03; Good Friday	16/03/26-27-28 easter		Fry-Mon	Sea Shanty Festival; National Waterways Museum, Shanty UK	06 ?	United Kingdom, Ellesmere Port
May						
15/05/10; Muttertag			Sun	Soltauer Shanty-Festival; Soltauer Shantychor e.V.	05	Germany, Soltau
15/05/14; Himmelfahrt	16/05/05; Himmelfahrt		Thu	Shanty-Festival am Museumshafen; Museumshafen Büsum e.V.	08	Germany, Büsum
15/05/14; Himmelfahrt	16/05/05; Himmelfahrt	17/05/25; Himmelfahrt	Thu; 1995	Friesischer Frühschoppen; Shanty Chor "Die Luttermöwen"	06; 2'500	Germany, Gütersloh; Lothar Kache
15/05/25 whitsun	16/05/16 whitsun		Mon	Shantyfestival Brummen; Shantykoor "De Ijsselboei"		Netherlands, Brummen
15/05/17			Sun	Landes-Chortreffen "Zwei Küsten - ein Norden"; Kurverwaltung Insel Poel	05	Germany, Insel Poel
15/05/22			Fry-Sun	Gloucester Shanty Festival gloucestershantyfestival.co.uk/	28	United Kingdom, Gloucester
15/05/30	16/05/28		Sat	Shantyfestival Winschoten; Shantykoor Maritiem Winschoten	11	Netherlands, Winschoten
15/05/30			Sat	Regge Coast Shanty Festival; Shantykoor "Die Regghe Sangers"	10	Netherlands, Hellendoorn
June						
15/06/05	16/06/03		Fry-Sun	Langesund Intern. Shanty Festival; Langesund Mandssangforening	14	Norway, Langesund
15/06/06; 1. Juni-WE	16/06/04-05; 1. Juni-WE	17/06/03; 1. Juni-WE	Sat, Sun; 1993	Shanty-Festival-Seelze; Shanty-Chor-Lohnde	10; 2'500	Germany, Seelze; Rolf Zikowsky
15/06/06-07; 1. Juni-WE	16/06/03-05; 1. Juni-WE		Fry-Sun; 1980	Shantys zum Vegesacker Hafenfest; Vegesacker Hafenfest e.V.	04	Germany, Bremen
15/06/12			Fry-Sun	Bravour Shantyfestival / Havendagen; Zeemanskoor Bravour	07	Netherlands, Woerden
15/06/12-14	16/06/17-19		Fry-Sun	Falmouth Intern. Sea Shanty Festival falmouthseashanty.co.uk	53; 25'000	United Kingdom, Falmouth
15/06/12; 2.Fry Jun	16/06/10; 2.Fry Jun		Fry-Sun	Dahmer Shantychortreffen; Kurbetrieb Ostseebad Dahme	13	Germany, Dahme
15/06/14; 2.Sun Jun	16/06/19; 3.Sun Jun		Sun; 2012	Tag der Shanty-Chöre; Verkehrsverein Rheingrafenstein e.V.	05	Germany, Bad Münster am Stein-Ebernburg
15/06/19			Sat, Sun	Rosses Point Shanty Festival rossespointshanty.com/	22	Ireland, Rosses Point
15/06/20; 3.Sat Jun	16/06/18-19; 3.Sat Jun		Sat, Sun	Tag der Shantychöre; Nordseeheilbad Cuxhaven GmbH	16	Germany, Cuxhaven
no	16/06/25 every 4. year		Sat	Shantyfestival Maritiem; Shantykoor de Admiraliteitssjongers	?	Netherlands, Dokkum
15/06/26; 4.Fry Jun	16/06/24; 4.Fry Jun		Fry-Sun	Shanty-Festival Travemünde; Kulturbühne Travemünde gUG	40	Germany, Travemünde
15/06/28			Sun	Scholtenhagen-Festival; Lionsclub Haaksbergen	12	Netherlands, Haaksbergen
July						
15/07/11; 2.Sat Jul	16/07/09; 2.Sat Jul		Sat, Sun; 2007	Shanty-Festival Carolinensiel; Shanty-Chor-Carolinensiel	07; 1'200	Germany, Wittmund; Gerhard Sander
15/07/12; 2.Sun July	16/07/10; 2.Sun July	17/07/09; 2.Sun July	Sun	Festival der Shanty-Chöre Steinhude; Wunstorfer Shanty-Chor	06	Germany, Wunstorf
15/07/12			Sun	Shanty-Festival Hude; Shanty-Chor Hude	05	Germany, Hude
15/07/18 every 2 years	no		Sat, Sun	Shanty-Festival des Altländer SC; Altländer Shanty-Chor e.V.	12	Germany, Grünendeich
15/07/19			Sun	Shantychortreffen; Shantychor "Reriker Heulbojen" e.V.	06	Germany, Rerik
15/07/24			Fry, Sat	Shantys und Me(h)erDie Warnemünder Jungs ?	10	Germany, Rostock-Warnemünde
15/07/24			Fry-Sun	Shantykor Festival caroline-s.dk	08	Denmark, Svendborg
15/07/31-02; 1.Sat Aug	16/08/05-07; 1.Sat Aug		Fry-Sun	Festival Maritim; Vegesack Marketing e.V.	14; 100'000	Germany, Bremen
August						
15/08/02	16/08/07		Sun; 2015	Shanty-Festival auf dem Fischerfest; Rheinisches Fischerfest Gernsh.GmbH	07	Germany, Gernsheim
15/08/08; 2.Sat Aug	15/08/13; 2.Sat Aug		Sat; 2013	Shanty-Chortreffen der Seeteufel; Musikverein "Seeteufel" Halle e.V.	04; 500	Germany, Seegebiet Mansfelder Land; Annelore Schöllner
15/08/09			Sun; 2011	Shanty-Open Air; Shantychor Geeste e.V.	08	Germany, Geeste
15/08/12			Wed-Sun	Melodien der Meere (Sail Bremerhaven); Stadt Bremerhaven	31	Germany, Bremerhaven
15/08/14	no	?	Fry-Sun; 1989	Festival du chant de marin Assoc. "Festival du chant de marin"	160; 145'000	France, Paimpol; Julie Aoura
15/08/16			Sun	Inselfest Steyerberg; Shantychor Nendorf	05	Germany, Steyerberg
15/08/28	16/08/26-28		Fry-Sun	Intern. Shantyfestival 'Bie Daip'; Stichting Bie Daip	34	Netherlands, Appingedam
15/08/28-29	16/08/26-28		Fry, Sat	Shanty- und Seemannschor - Festival; Shanty-Chor Insel Usedom e.V.	06	Germany, Usedom
15/08/29			Sat	Shantyfestival in Stadskanaal; Shantykoor De Noszélie Singers	10	Netherlands, Stadskanaal
15/08/13-16	16/08/17-21	17/08/16-20	Wed-Sun 1998	Festival du Chant de marins Saint-Jean-Port-Joli	10 15000	Canada, Saint-Jean-Port-Joli, QC
September						
15/09/04			Fry-Sun	Internationaal Shantyfestival; Stichting Shantyfestival Rotterdam	23	Netherlands, Rotterdam
15/09/04			Fry-Sun	Vliegende Hollander Festival; Stichting Shantyfestival Zeeuws Vlaanderen	15	Netherlands, Terneuzen
15/09/05			Sat, Sun	Shantyfestival	11	Netherlands, Delfzijl
15/09/11-13			Fry-Sun	Treffen der Shantychöre	07	Germany, Zingst am Darß
15/09/12			Sat	Shantyfestival te Leeuwarden; Leeuwarder Shantykoor	05	Netherlands, Leeuwarden
15/09/13			Sun	Shanty & Seasong Festival; Havenkoor Fortitudo	12	Netherlands, Willemstad
15/09/13			Sun	Intern. Shanty and Seasong festival Stichting Shanty Cultuur Emmen	07	Netherlands, Emmen
October						
15/10/03-04				Liverpool Sea Shanty Festival shanty.org.uk		United Kingdom, Liverpool
15/10/03			Sat	Shantyfestival Norddeich; Norddeicher Shantychor 2000 e.V.	05	Germany, Norden
15/10/03			Sat	ShantyFestival Spijkenisse shantyfestivalspijkenisse.nl/	10	Netherlands, Spijkenisse
15/10/09			Sat, Sun	Harwich Intern. Sea Shanty Festival; The Harwich Intern. Shanty Festival	17	United Kingdom, Harwich
15/10/17-18; 3.WE Oct	16/10/15-16; 3.WE Oct	17/10/14? 3.WE Oct	Sat, Sun; 1994	Stader Shantychor-Festival; Stade Aktuell GmbH	17	Germany, Stade; Manfred Höftmann

== Gallery ==
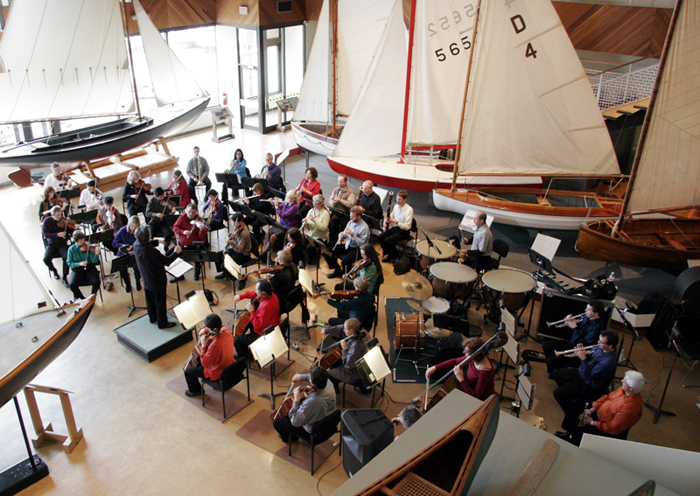
Symphony Nova Scotia performs at the Maritime Museum of the Atlantic

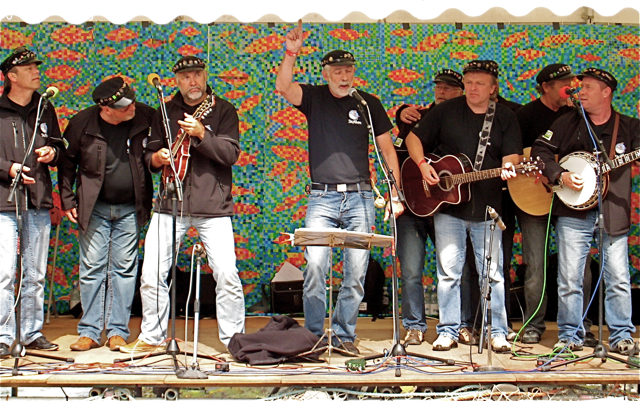
Portsoy Boat Festival

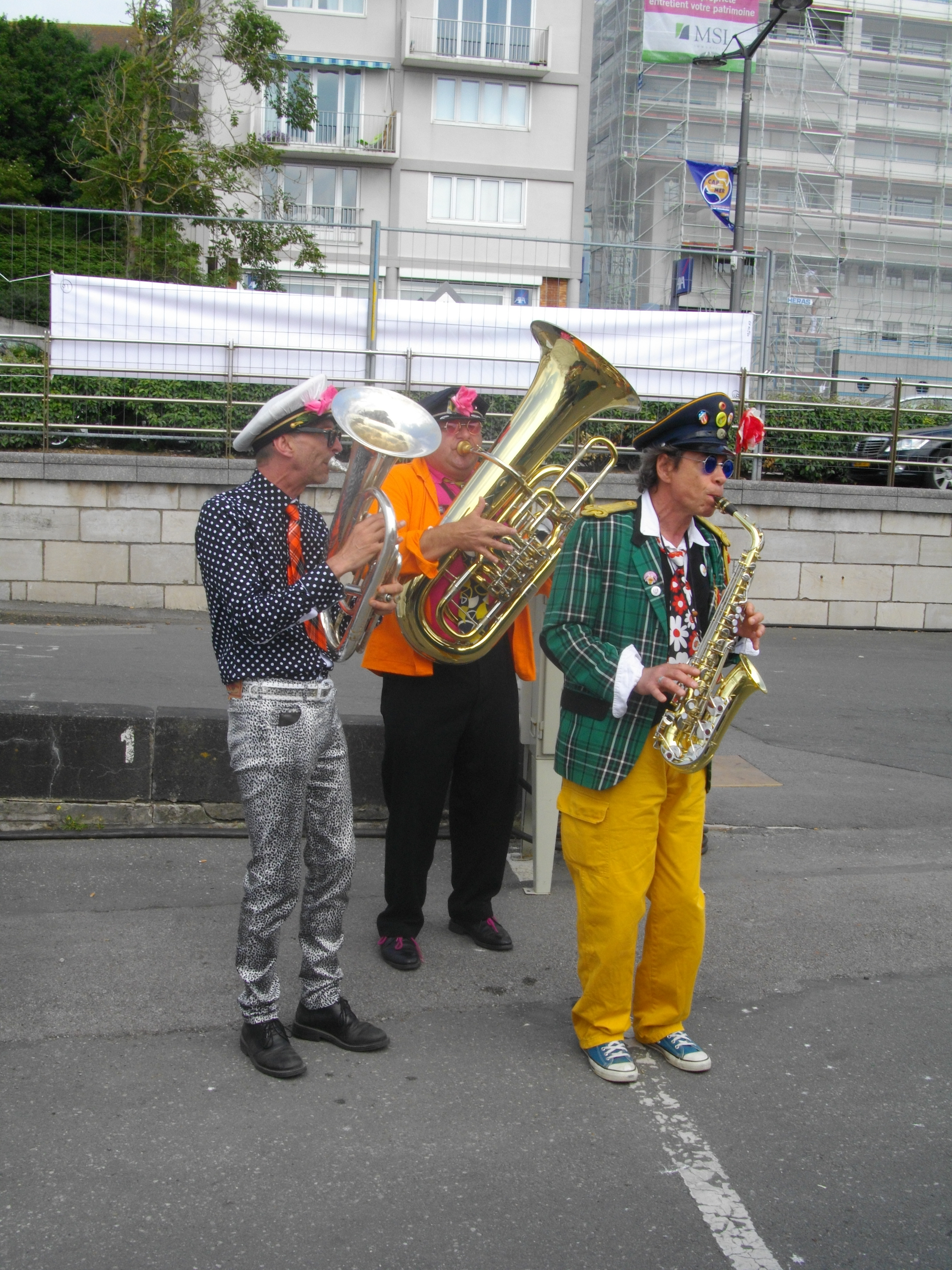
Fête de la mer à Boulogne-sur-Mer, 2013

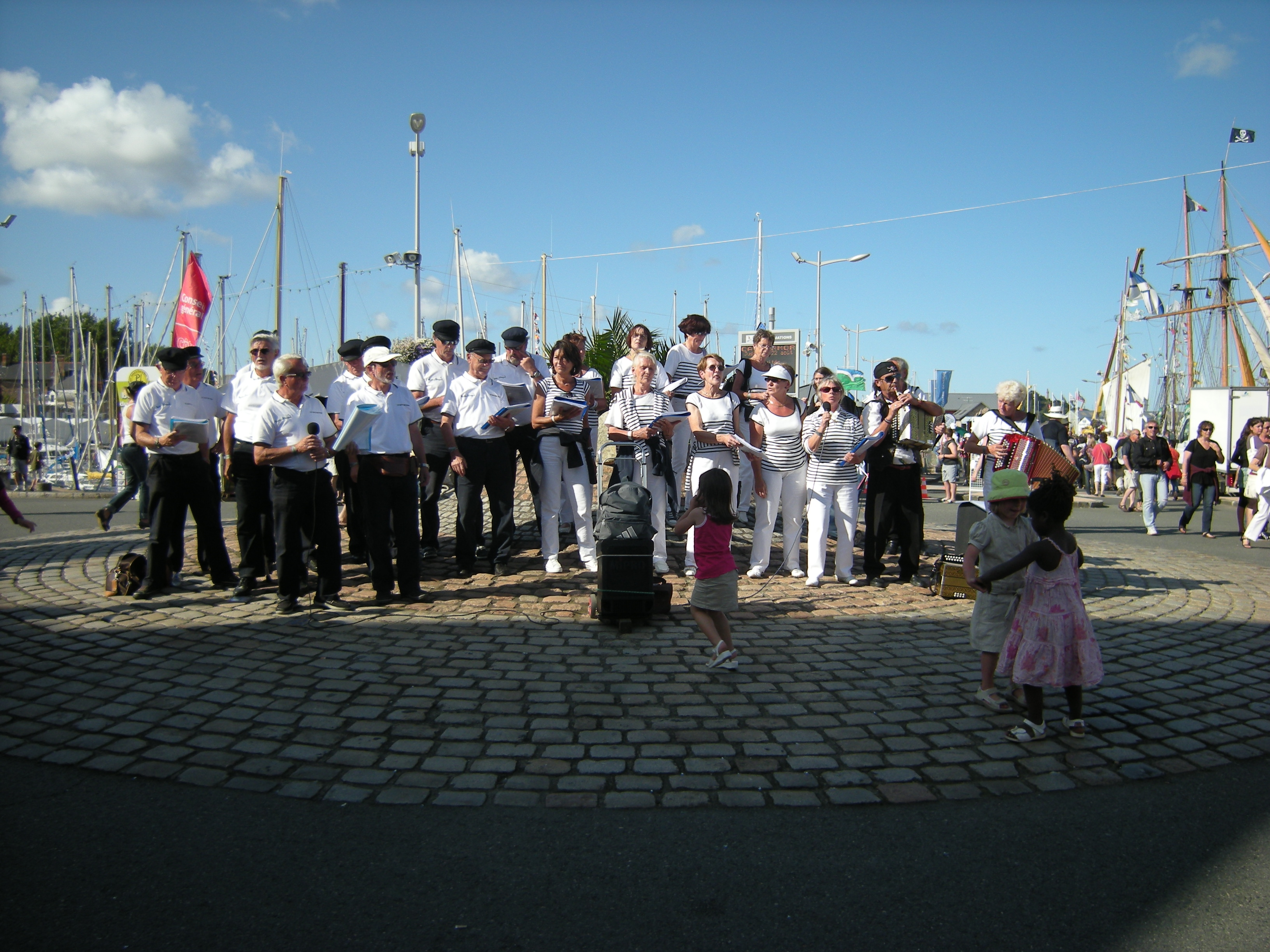
Festival du chant de marin 2009

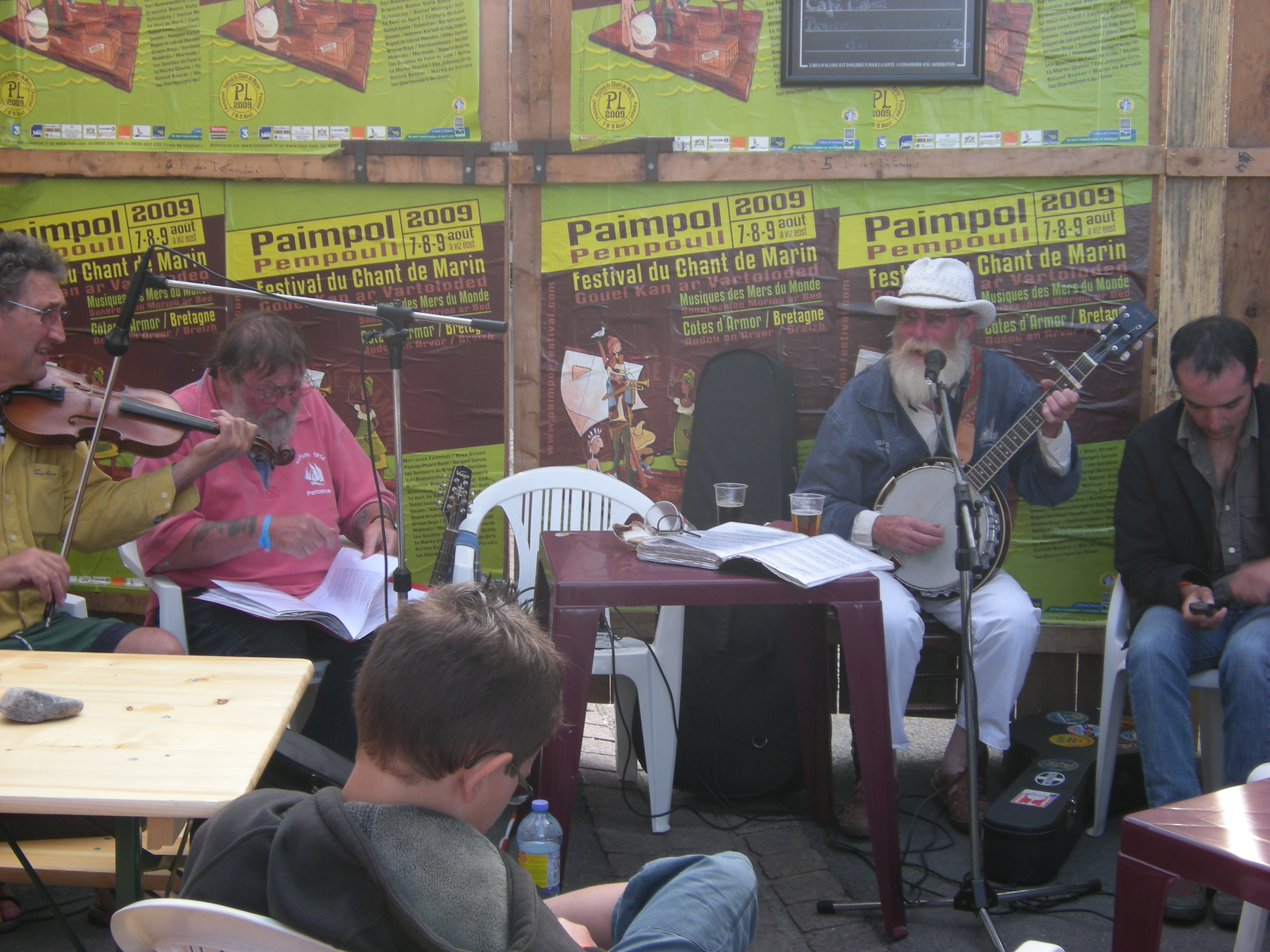
Festival du chant de marin 2009

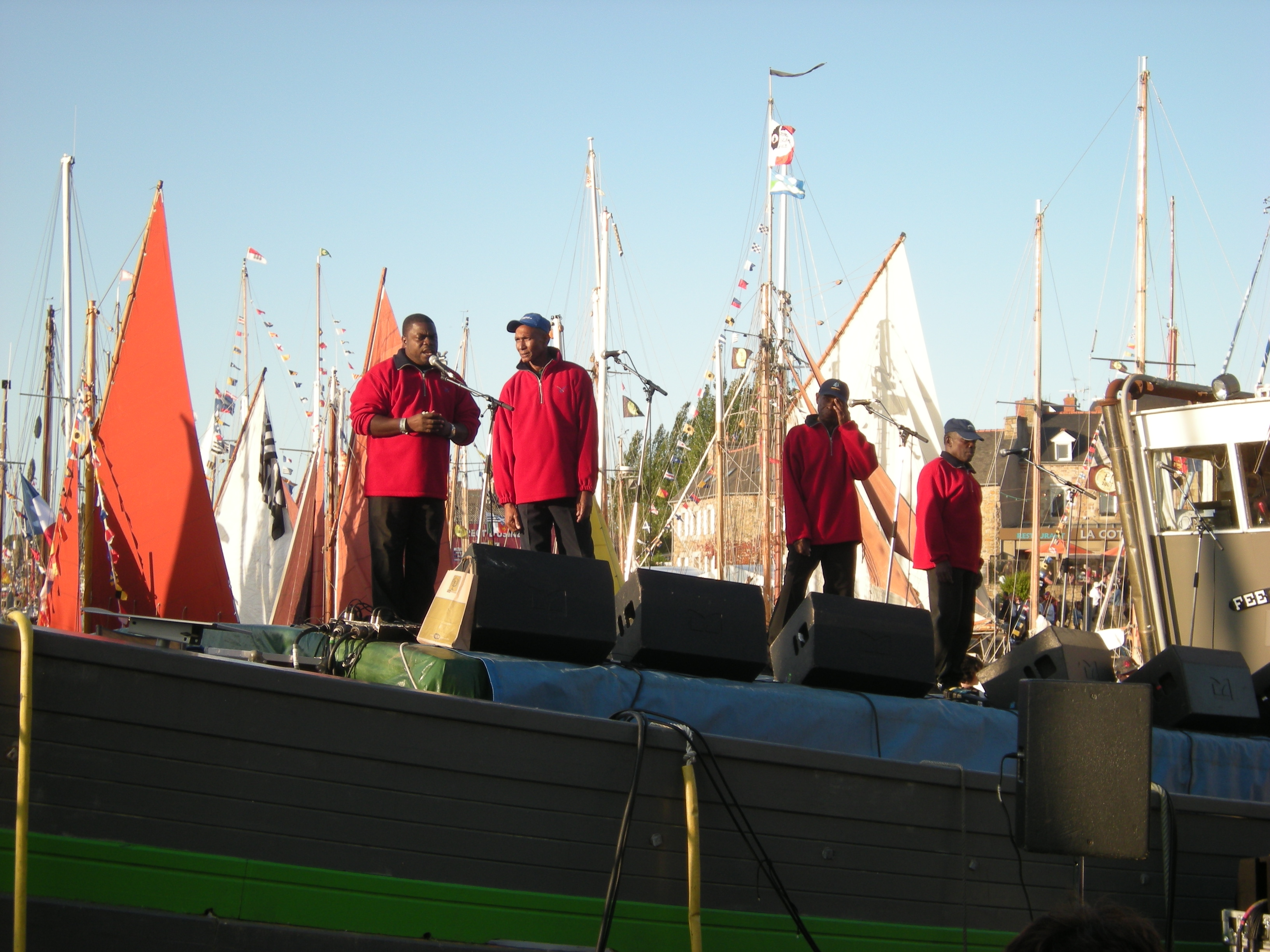
Festival du chant de marin 2009

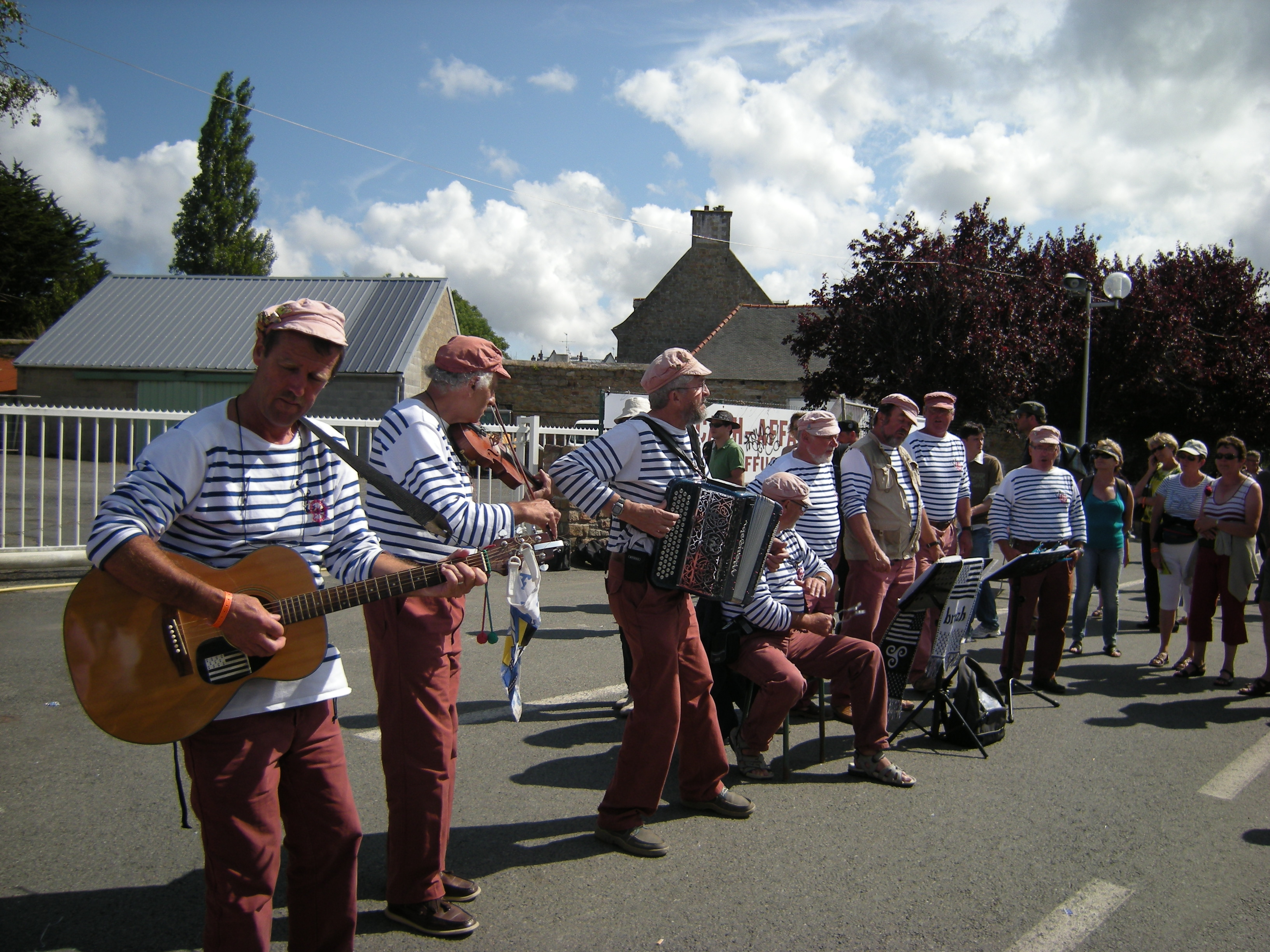
Festival du chant de marin 2009

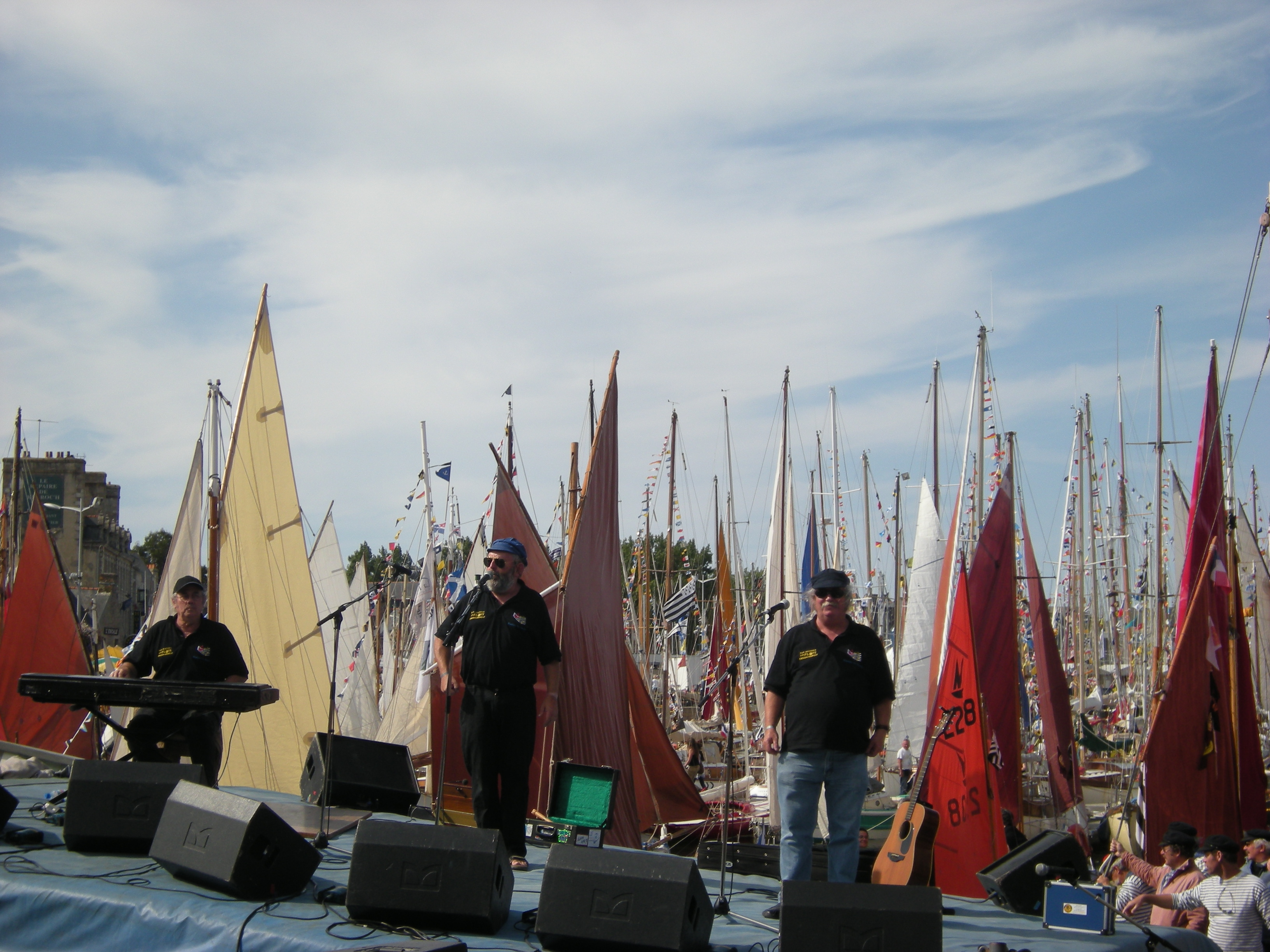
Festival du chant de marin. Paimpol 2009

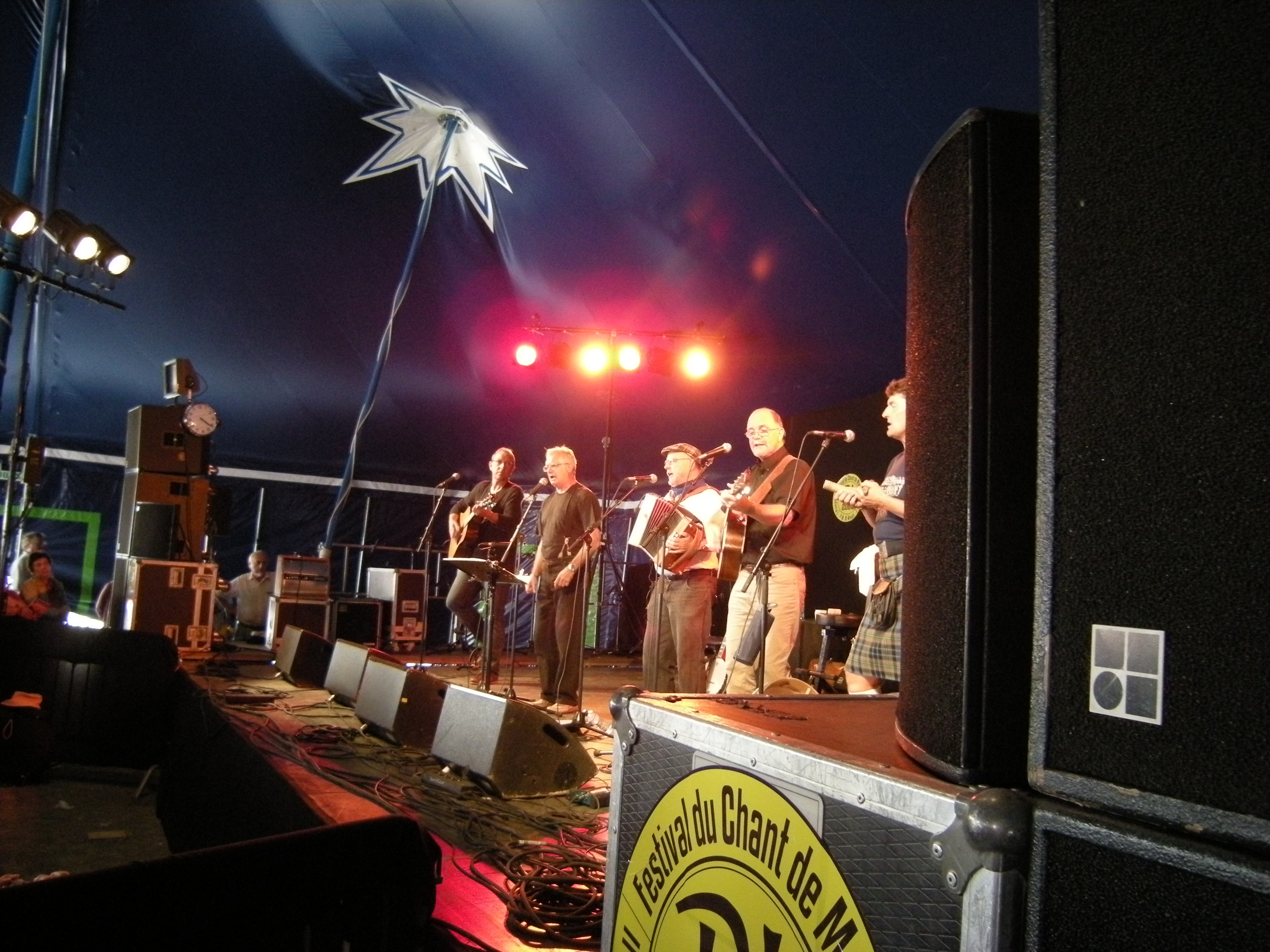
Festival du chant de marin. Paimpol 2009

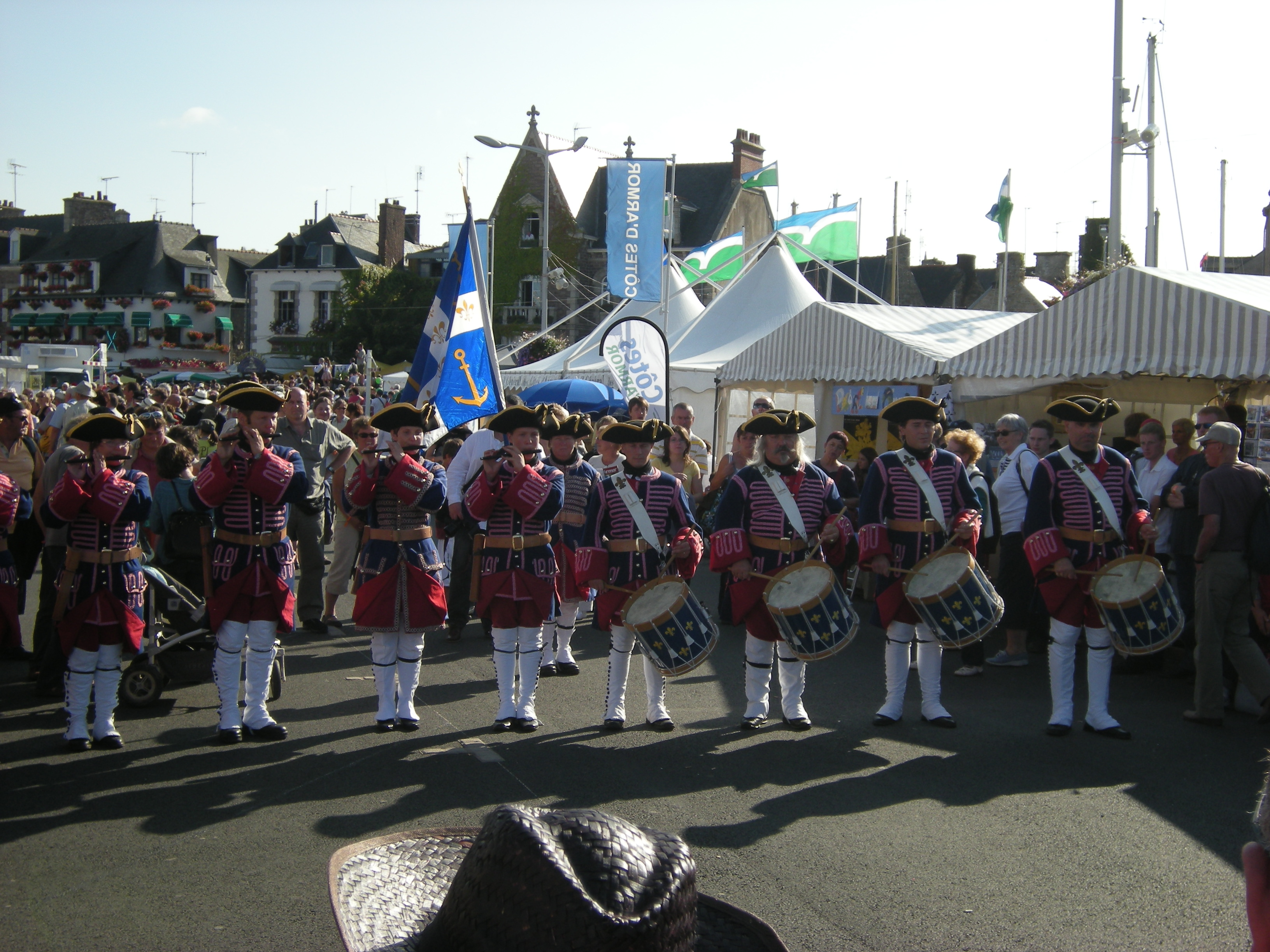
Festival du chant de marin 2009

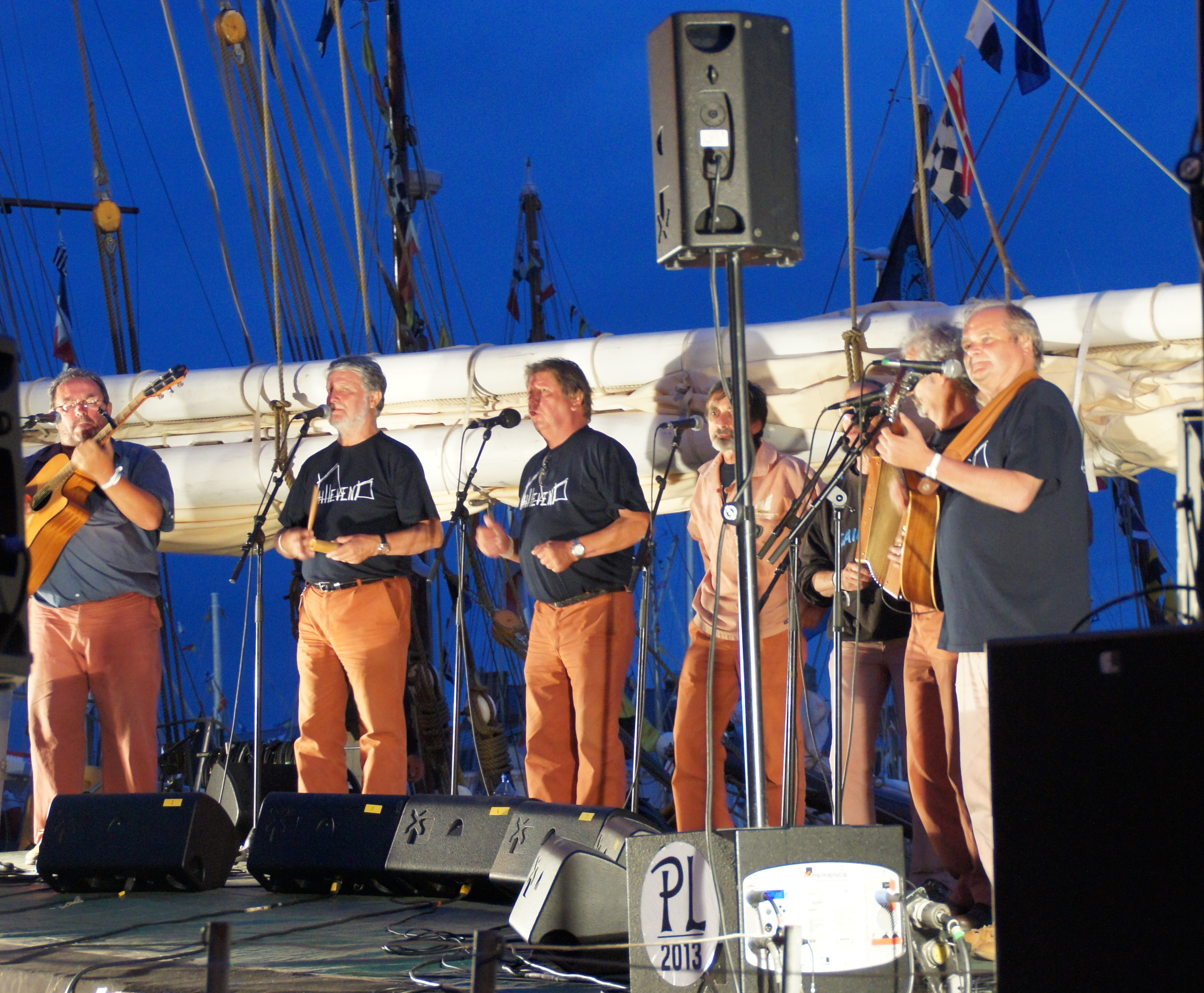
Fée de l'Aune Paimpol 2013

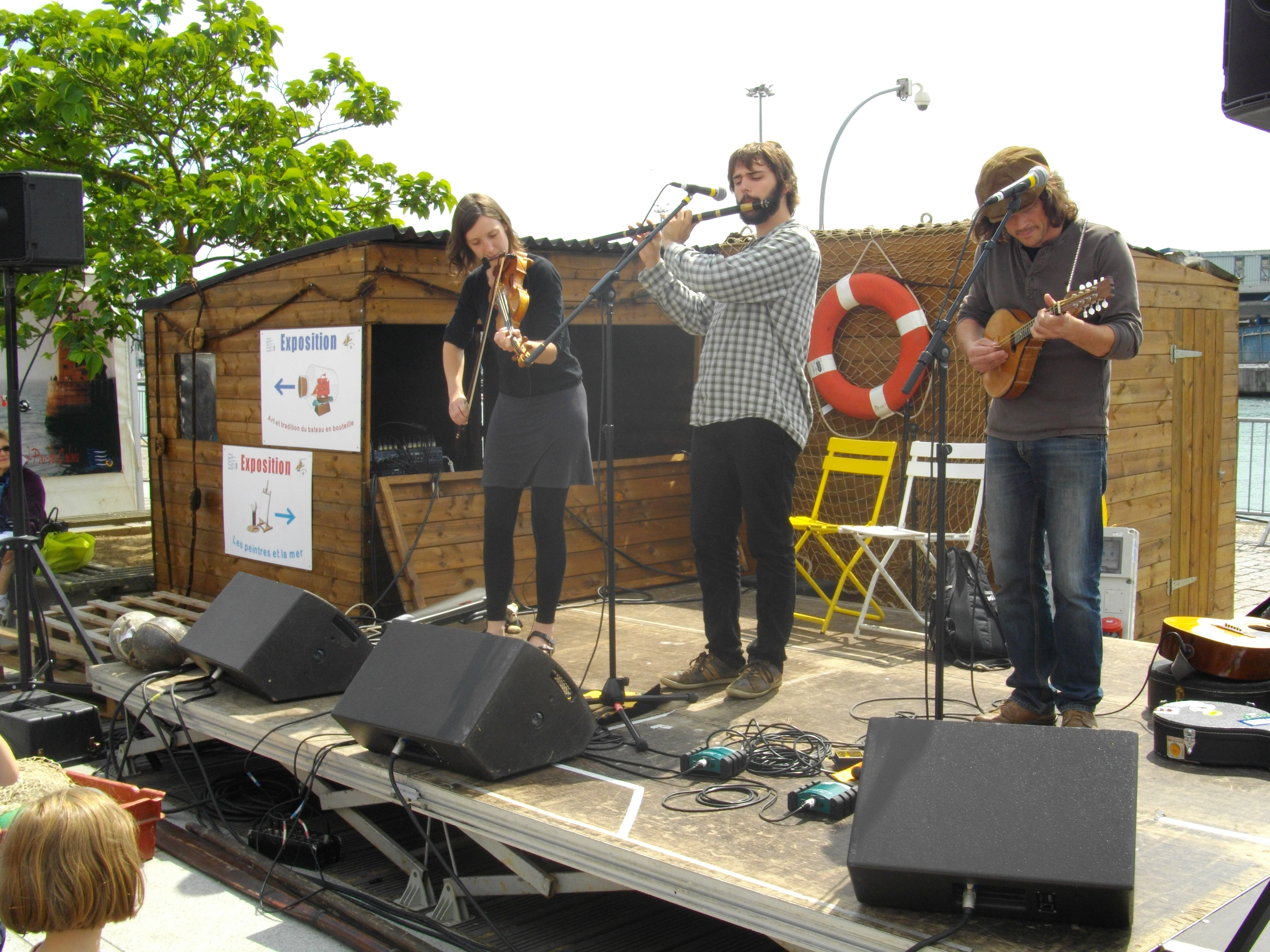
Fête de la mer (Boulogne, 2013)

== See also ==
- Sea shanty
- List of music festivals
- List of folk festivals
- List of maritime music performers
- List of maritime museums in the United States
