= Brian Peters (folk singer) =

English folk singer

Brian Peters (born 15 December 1954) is an English folk singer and multi-instrumentalist. He is known particularly for his interpretations of the Child Ballads and his researches in the traditional music of the North-East of England. He is acknowledged as one of England's leading exponents of the Anglo Concertina and melodeon.

He was born in Stockport, Cheshire, England. Peters is best known in the folk clubs of England, but has also taken his performances to festival and concert stages all over the world, often touring in America, Europe and Australia. He has been described in the folk press as "one of British folk music's finest ambassadors".

He has made many recordings, from the concertina-centred Anglophilia to the ballad-themed Songs of Trial and Triumph. He is also the melodeon player heard on the TV cartoon, SpongeBob SquarePants.

== Discography ==
- Persistence of Memory
- Fools of Fortune
- The Seeds of Time
- Squeezing Out Sparks
- Sharper than the Thorn
- The Beast in the Box
- Lines
- Different Tongues
- Anglophilia
- Songs of Trial and Triumph (Child Ballads arranged by Brian Peters)
- Gritstone Serenade PUG CD 08

with other artists

- with Gordon Tyrrall:
  - Clear The Road
  - The Moving Moon
- with Dave Webber, Anni Fentiman, John O'Hagan & John Morris:
  - The Widow's Uniform (soldier's poems of Rudyard Kipling as set to music by Peter Bellamy)
- with Graham Buckley, Bonz & Dave Pope:
  - The Rocky Mountain Ploughboys (1999)
- with Jeff Davis:
  - Sharp's Appalachian Harvest (2013)

Television

  - SpongeBob SquarePants (2002–2009)
