= Morrigan (band) =

American traditional music group

Morrigan was a traditional music group formed in 1978 in Seattle by folk musicians Marc Bridgham, Mary Malloy, and William Pint. The group played traditional music of Ireland, Scotland and England.

Morrigan's version of the traditional sea song "Bully in the Alley" was featured on the 1980 Folkways Records album Songs of the Sea: The National Maritime Museum Festival of the Sea and the 2004 Smithsonian Folkways release Classic Maritime Music from Smithsonian Folkways.

== Discography ==
- By Land or By Sea (1980)
- Leave Her Johnny, Leave Her: The Stories and Shanties of Hjalmar Rutzebeck (1981)
