= Tom and Chris Kastle =

American maritime music performing duo

Tom and Chris Kastle (formerly known as Privateer) are a maritime music performing duo based in Chicago. They first began performing maritime music in approximately 1977. In the mid-1980s they were known for running "whale watching" concert cruises on Lake Michigan on the sailing schooner Charlotte Ann.

The Kastles have been associated with various maritime-themed festivals and music festivals in Chicago over the years, including the "Chicago Maritime Folk Festival" also in the mid-1980s. They were also involved in the various Tall Ships festivals in Chicago from at least 1994. They have also been artistic directors of the Chinquapin Folk Music and Storytelling Festival since its beginnings in 1995. In 2003 they founded and became directors of the Chicago Maritime Festival.

The Kastles have also appeared on numerous radio shows including The Midnight Special and television shows and have toured internationally, appearing at the Shanties Festival in Poland as well as at the National Maritime Museum in New Zealand. They have also performed at numerous tall ships and maritime music festivals around the United States.

Tom Kastle's song, Cold Winds was covered by Midwestern folk musician Lee Murdock on Murdock's 1991 album Cold Winds.

Around 2010, Tom Kastle relocated to Madison, Wisconsin and Chris Kastle relocated to St. Augustine, Florida, each pursuing a solo career; but they also continue to perform together.

== Discography ==
=== Tom and Chris Kastle ===
- Let the Waves Roll High (1981)
- O'er the Stormy Sea (1983)
- Helm's Alee! (1986)
- Work and the Waterways: An Aural History of Midwestern Workers (1987)
- Burnham Harbor (1989)
- See the Sea: Songs for Younger Sailors (1991)
- Earthways Waterways (1993)
- Strike the Bell (1995)
- That Time of Year: Songs and Stories of Christmas (1995)
- Stories and Songs of Simple Living (with accompanying book) (1997)
- Me For the Inland Lakes (1999)
- Rivers (2000)
- Familiar Waters (2005)

=== Chris Kastle ===
- Some Here and Some Now Gone (2011)
- Down Below the Waves (2011)
- The Roaring Rhinoceros and Friends (2011)

=== Tom Kastle ===
- Across the Centerline (2008)
- Tommy's Gone to Hilo (2010)

== Video ==
- The Mermaid and Other Sea Songs (1995)
- Chicago Stories: The Race to Mackinac, WTTW Channel 11 Chicago (video soundtrack) (2000)
- Ted Ashbey: Big Rig of the Gulf, Gaffrig Productions, Auckland, New Zealand (video soundtrack) (2003)
