= Bounding Main =

American a cappella sea shanty quintet

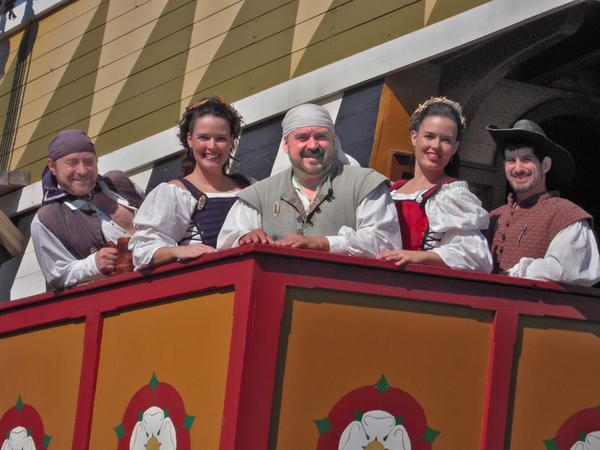
- Bounding Main at Bristol Renaissance Faire, Wisconsin, 2010

Background information
- Genres: Folk, sea shanties
- Years active: 2003–present
- Label: Independent
- Members: Dean Calin; Christie Dalby; Gina Dalby; Patrick Knapp, Jr. Jon Krivitzky
- Past members: Maggie Hannington; David Yondorf (d. 05/17/2023)
- Website: Official Site

Bounding Main is an a cappella quintet focusing on traditional sea shanties and maritime music. They are located in the United States.

Formed in 2003, Bounding Main's musical catalog focuses solely on maritime music. They perform traditional sea shanties and nautical ballads from as far back as 400 years ago, as well as contemporary pieces and original compositions. Bounding Main introduces historical music in a way that appeals to a wide range of listeners. Their use of harmony-focused arrangements brings new life to pieces generally arranged in a simple call and response format. They have a number of different costumes ranging from a traditional "Elizabethan sea dog" look to a more casual appearance with their French sailor smocks; they tailor their appearance to the performance and venue. This award-winning group has taken several international tours bringing their music to popular shanty and maritime festivals in locations such as Germany, the Netherlands, Poland, France, England, and Canada. They have been referenced in books focusing on maritime music and history, and their music has been included in maritime museum exhibits, used in film soundtracks, and has been preserved in the British Library's Sound Archive.

Their fan club is known as the Bounding Mainiacs.

== History ==
Dean Calin reached out to veteran environmental theater performers, Christie Dalby, Gina Dalby, Jon Krivitzky, David Yondorf, and Maggie Hannington, inquiring if they wanted to join to sing maritime music. The group met for rehearsal for the first time on January 19, 2003. From 2003 through early 2010, the group had six members. In mid-2010, the group began performing as a quintet when Maggie Hannington retired from the group to make time for her family. In 2023, the group began performing as a quartet following the death of original member, David Yondorf, on May 17, 2023, following a brief battle with cancer. In 2024, Bounding Main welcomed a new member to their group, Patrick Knapp Jr., who replaced David Yondorf as the group's baritone/bass.

As the original performers were vocalists, and traditional sea shanties were often performed a cappella, the group decided to perform their music a cappella with minimal percussion for select songs. The group originally collaborated with instrumentalists on their first CD, Maiden Voyage, but since then have elected to mainly produce a capella tracks.

Bounding Main has performed at maritime museums, maritime music festivals, including the Chicago Maritime Festival, tall ship festivals, harbor festivals, arts festivals, pirate festivals, renaissance faires, wooden boat shows, corporate events and private parties. Additionally, the group has performed at international music festivals in Canada and Europe.

Bounding Main has produced six CDs: Maiden Voyage, Lost at Sea, Going Overboard, Operation Share the Shanties, Kraken Up, and Fish Out of Water. Going Overboard was favorably reviewed in Dirty Linen magazine in 2010.

== International Tours/Performances of Note ==
=== August 2008 ===
Bounding Main's first performance in Europe was at the Festival Maritim in Bremen-Vegesack, Germany in August 2008. They were one of only four bands from the US to be represented at this festival between 2002 and 2009. Festival Maritim, which started in 1999, attracts high quality, professional bands and choirs from all over Europe and the world.

While in Germany for this festival, the group also performed at other locations in The Netherlands and Germany, most notably a charity performance to entertain US troops recovering at Landstuhl Regional Medical Center in Landstuhl, Germany.

=== October 2008 ===
Six weeks later, the group embarked upon their second overseas trip, traveling to The Netherlands for the Liereliet Festival. Based in Workum, this festival has been entertaining with authentic work songs and sailing activities since 1988.

=== February 2010 ===
Bounding Main performed at the 29th International Sailors' Song Festival, "Shanties 2010" in Kraków, Poland. This popular shanty festival has become one of the most important in the world since its founding in 1981.

=== August 2011 ===
In August 2011 Bounding Main again traveled to The Netherlands and performed at the 10th anniversary of the "Bie Daip International Shanty Festival" in Appingedam, Netherlands.

=== August 2012 ===
Quebec, Canada, was the site of Bounding Main's next tour, where they performed at the "La Fête des chants de marins" in Saint-Jean-Port-Joli. This festival, which attracts as many as 20,000 visitors in a year, highlights the maritime culture and local heritage of the Saint Lawrence River area.

=== August 2013 ===
Paimpol, in Brittany, north-west France, was the site of Bounding Main's 2013 tour, where they performed at the "Festival du Chants de Marin de Paimpol". This event, in the French region of Brittany, brings in world-class performers from all points of the compass. The festival regularly attracts enthusiastic audiences of more than 130,000 people.

=== August 2014 ===
In August 2014, Bounding Main again traveled to the Netherlands and performed at the "Bie Daip International Shanty Festival" in Appingedam, Netherlands. They then traveled to Germany to perform at the "Hafenfest Papenburg" festival in Papenburg, Germany.

=== August/September 2016 ===
In August/September 2016, Bounding Main traveled to the Netherlands to perform at the "Bie Daip International Shanty Festival" in Appingedam, Netherlands. This was the third time Bounding Main performed at this festival. They then traveled to Germany to perform at the "Hafenfest Papenburg" festival in Papenburg, Germany. This was their second appearance at this festival.

=== June 2017 ===
In June 2017, Bounding Main traveled to Cornwall, U.K., to perform at the Falmouth International Sea Shanty Festival in Falmouth, Cornwall, England, United Kingdom. They then travelled to the Netherlands to perform at the "International Folk & Shanty Festival" in Giethoorn, Netherlands. This was their first appearance for Bounding Main at each of these festivals.

=== August 2019 ===
Paimpol, in Brittany, north-west France, was the site of Bounding Main's 2019 tour, where they performed at the "Festival du Chants de Marin de Paimpol". This event, in the French region of Brittany, brings in world-class performers from all points of the compass. This was the festival's 30th anniversary, titled "Best of", and was Bounding Main's second appearance at the festival. Their music was included on the festival CD, "Festival du Chant de Marin Gouel Kan Ar Vartoloded".

=== February 2020 ===
In February 2020, Bounding Main performed at the International Sailors' Song Festival, "Shanties 2020" in Kraków, Poland. This marked Bounding Main's second appearance at this popular shanty festival. Bounding Main was the recipient of the "Hat of Krakow" award. Additionally, Christie Dalby and Gina Dalby were honored with the "Figurehead 2020" award at this festival.

=== February 2021 ===
In February 2021, Bounding Main was asked to participate in the 40th anniversary of the International Sailors' Song Festival, "Shanties 2021". Their music was broadcast on Friday, February 26, 2021, from Kraków, Poland. The annual festival was moved to a virtual format in response to the COVID-19 pandemic.

=== March 2022 ===
In March 2022, Bounding Main opened for The Longest Johns North America "Smoke & Oakum Tour" when they came to the Chicagoland area. The concert was held at the Evanston SPACE concert hall.

=== August 2024 ===
In August 2024, Bounding Main once again traveled to the Netherlands to perform. Their first concert was at the Grande Cafe' Fanfare in Giethoorn. They then continued on to Appingedam where they performed at the "Bie Daip International Folk & Seasong Festival". This was the fourth time Bounding Main has appeared at the maritime festival in Appingedam .

=== July 2025 ===
On July 3, 2025, Bounding Main performed at Summerfest in Milwaukee, Wisconsin. This music festival was named "The World's Largest Music Festival" by the Guinness Book of World Records in 1999. In 2025, the nine day event hosted 600 artists and saw more than 602,000 attendees over the course of the event. Bounding Main performed at the Tiki Hut stage where they were the first a cappella quintet to perform on that stage.

=== June 2026 ===
From June 12–15, 2026, Bounding Main performed at The Connecticut Sea Music Festival in Essex, Connecticut. The festival is put on by the Maritime Music & Tradition Society whose mission is to preserve and encourage maritime and traditional music through education, research, performance, and community.

On June 19, 2026, Bounding Main once again performed at Summerfest in Milwaukee, Wisconsin. This music festival was named "The World's Largest Music Festival" by the Guinness Book of World Records in 1999. Bounding Main performed at the Tiki Hut stage.

=== August 2027 ===
In August 2027, Bounding Main will return to Paimpol, France, to perform at the "Festival du Chants de Marin de Paimpol". This event, in the French region of Brittany, brings in world-class performers from all points of the compass and sees more than 130,000 people over the three day festival. This will be Bounding Main's third appearance at this music festival . The group was set to perform at the festival in 2025 but had to decline due to the illness of one of their members.

== Museums ==
Bounding Main's music has been presented at the following museums as a representation of either maritime or pirate music.

- Door County Maritime Museum - Pirates - Ship to Shore exhibit
- Wisconsin Maritime Museum - River Rendezvous, Submarine Fest 2015, Submarine Fest 2016
- Oshkosh Public Museum - Pirates Exhibit
- Kenosha History Center - Southport Lighthouse Festival
- Chicago History Museum - Chicago Maritime Festival
- Mystic Seaport museum - Neptune's Orchestra: Songs of the Seafarer exhibit
- Milwaukee Public Museum - Real Pirates exhibit

Additionally, their music is part of NRG's traveling "Treasure" exhibit.

== Honors and awards ==
1. "Renaissance Festival Podcast" Best Music Groups of 2006 (placed 4th)
2. "Renaissance Festival Podcast" Best Music Groups of 2007 (placed 4th)
3. "Renaissance Festival Podcast" Best Music Groups of 2008 (placed 4th)
4. "Renaissance Festival Podcast" Best New CD Released in 2011 (placed 3rd for Kraken Up)
5. "Renaissance Festival Awards" Stage Shows - Best Musical Group (non-comedy performance) (placed 4th); Best Comedy-Musical Show (placed 3rd) - 2013
6. Constant Contact "All Star Award": 2012, 2013, and 2015
7. British Library's Sound Archive: Selected by the British Library for preservation in their sound archive. Full live performance recorded at the Falmouth International Sea Shanty Festival, Falmouth, Cornwall, UK, June 2017.
8. "Renaissance Festival Awards" Large Musical Acapella Stage Acts - 2019 (placed 3rd)
9. "Hat of Krakow" Award, Shanties 2020 Festival, Krakow, Poland, February 2020
10. "Figurehead 2020" Award, Shanties 2020 Festival, Krakow, Poland, February 2020
11. "Renaissance Festival Awards" Large Music Acapella or Instrumental Stage Act - 2021 (placed 2nd)
12. "Renaissance Festival Awards" Favorite A Capella Musical Stage Act - 2022 (placed 2nd)
13. Wisconsin Area Music Industry (WAMI) Award Nomination - Ensemble Vocals, 2026.

== Articles/Publications ==
- Profiled in Magazyn Miłośników Kultury Morza Shantyman, "Bounding Main USA", January 2020.
- Profiled in Door County Pulse, "A Cappella Group Recorded by the British Library", February 9, 2018.
- Profiled in Ozaukee Magazine, "5 Questions With Bounding Main", June 30, 2014.
- Profiled in Door County Now, "Holiday's Lawn Concert Series kicks off", May 23, 2012.
- Profiled in Weser Report, "Die Welt trifft sich in Vegesack", August 10, 2008.
- Profiled in Die Norddeutsch, "Stelldichein der Shanty-Fans", August 10, 2008.
- Profiled in Renaissance Magazine, "Bounding Main", August 15, 2007.
- Profiled in Grayslake Times, "Off the Beaten Shore; Maritime Group Celebrates Life Through Song", February 17–23, 2006.
- Profiled in On Milwaukee.com, "Bounding Main revives maritime music for a new generation", February, 2006.
- Referenced in "Worth the Singin' - the Tom Lewis Songbook, 10th Anniversary Edition", by Tom Lewis.
- Referenced in "My World of Shanties or Everything you wanted to know about shanties but never dared to ask" by Fred Winkel.
- Guest appearance on the Washington, DC, NPR station WAMU's 1A program for the episode, "NP-Yarrr: Unraveling the romance of the pirate in pop culture", aired on May 15, 2024.
- Profiled in Editie Nieuwsbode De Kop, "Vocale groep Bounding Main geeft optreden in Grandecafé Fanfare", August 21, 2024.
- Profiled on Renaissance Festival Music Podcast, "Bounding Main Interview", Season 21, Episode 22, released on October 11, 2026.

== Discography ==
Bounding Main has produced six albums:

Album	Track listing	Personnel
2004 Maiden Voyage; Produced by Bounding Main; Recorded, mixed, and mastered at SurroundinSoundStudio (near Milwaukee, Wisconsin); Engineer: Jonathan Leubner; Cover Design: Dean Calin, Christie Dalby, Gina Dalby	1. Mingulay Boat Song: Hugh S. Roberton, arranger Jon Krivitzky, additional lyrics by Dean Calin; 2. Pump Shanty: Tony Goodenough, arr. Jon Krivitzky, cello by Heather Lewin; 3. Fiddler's Green: John Connolly, solo by Dean Calin, concertina by David H.B. Drake; 4. Pay Me, You Owe Me: traditional, arr. Jon Krivitzky, solo by Jon Krivitzky, percussion by David H.B. Drake; 5. Sailor's Prayer: Rod MacDonald, arr. Jon Krivitzky; 6. Old Maui: trad., arr. Jon Krivitzky, solo by David Yondorf; 7. A Rovin' (Amsterdam Maid): trad., arr. Jon Krivitzky, solo by Dean Calin; 8. Blow the Wind Southerly: John Stobbs, additional lyrics and solo by Maggie Hannington; 9. The Mermaid: trad., additional lyrics by Bounding Main, violin by Heather Lewin; 10. Derelict: Young E. Allison, arr. Jon Krivitzky, based on arrangement by Mark Stahl of The Jolly Rogers, solo by David Yondorf, violin by Heather Lewin; 11. Leave Her, Johnnie: trad., arr. Jon Krivitzky, violin by Heather Lewin; 12. Health To The Company: Irish trad., arr. Jon Krivitzky	Dean Calin - Tenor; Christie Dalby - Alto; Gina Dalby - Alto; Maggie Hannington - Alto; Jonathan Krivitzky - Tenor; David Yondorf - Baritone; Guest Artists: Heather Lewin - cello, violin; David H.B. Drake - concertina, percussion
2005 Lost at Sea; Produced by Bounding Main; Engineer: Jonathan Leubner Cover Design: Dean Calin, Christie Dalby, Gina Dalby	1. High Barbaree; 2. Haul Away Joe; 3. Marching Inland; 4. Herzogin Cecile; 5. Bully in the Alley; 6. Northwest Passage; 7. Little Boy Billee; 8. A Capital Ship; 9. Irish Rover; 10. Dreadnought; 11. Cape Cod Girls; 12. Cadgewith Anthem; 13. All For Me Grog; 14. Randy Dandy O	Dean Calin - Tenor; Christie Dalby - Alto; Gina Dalby - Alto; Jonathan Krivitzky - Tenor; Maggie Hannington - Alto; David Yondorf - Baritone
2007 Going Overboard; Produced by Bounding Main; Engineer: Jonathan Leubner Cover Design: Dean Calin, Christie Dalby, Gina Dalby	1. South Australia; 2. To Ireland; 3. Leaving of Liverpool; 4. Johnny Come to Hilo; 5. Old Dun Cow; 6. Blow Liza Blow; 7. Bristol Girls; 8. Toss and Roll; 9. Ocean Liner; 10. Blow Boys Blow; 11. Fire Marengo; 12. Pass the Mug; 13. Golden Vanity; 14. Fareweel Tae Tarwathie	Dean Calin - Tenor; Christie Dalby - Alto; Gina Dalby - Alto; Jonathan Krivitzky - Tenor; Maggie Hannington - Alto; David Yondorf - Baritone
2008 Operation Share the Shanties; Produced by Bounding Main; Engineer: Jonathan Leubner; Design: Dean Calin, Christie Dalby, Gina Dalby	1. South Australia; 2. Mingulay Boat Song; 3. Blow Liza Blow; 4. Derelict; 5. Leaving of Liverpool; 6. Bully in the Alley; 7. Northwest Passage; 8. High Barbaree; 9. Bristol Girls; 10. Leave Her, Johnnie; 11. The Star Spangled Banner	Dean Calin - Tenor; Christie Dalby - Alto; Gina Dalby - Alto; Jonathan Krivitzky - Tenor; Maggie Hannington - Alto; David Yondorf - Baritone
2011 Kraken Up; Produced by Bounding Main; Recorded at SurroundinSoundStudio; Additional tracks recorded at Smith/Lee Productions, St. Louis, Missouri; Engineer: Jonathan Leubner; Cover Design: Dean Calin, Christie Dalby, Gina Dalby	1. Dogger Bank; 2. Heilan' Laddie; 3. Call of the Sea; 4. Saltpeter Shanty; 5. "Sloop John B"; 6. Day of the Clipper; 7. Night Watchman's Lament; 8. Pull Down Below; 9. Green Eyed Girl; 10. My Bonnie (Lies Over the Ocean); 11. Barbershop Shanty; 12. Rolling Up, Rolling Down; 13. Le Capitaine de Saint-Malo; 14. Strike the Bell	Dean Calin - Tenor; Christie Dalby - Alto; Gina Dalby - Alto; Jonathan Krivitzky - Tenor; David Yondorf - Baritone; Additional Vocals: Maggie Hannington - Alto (retired)
2015 Fish Out of Water; Produced by Bounding Main; Recorded at SurroundinSoundStudio; Additional tracks recorded at Chapman Recording and Mastering; Engineer: Jonathan Leubner Cover Design: Dean Calin, Christie Dalby, Gina Dalby	1. Spanish Ladies; 2. Heave Away Cheerily-o; 3. One More Pull; 4. Sailor's Prayer; 5. Away Rio; 6. Man O' War; 7. Roll Call; 8. Paddy Lay Back; 9. Tow Rope Girls; 10. When He is Away; 11. Mingulay Boat Song; 12. Bimini; 13. Sugar in the Hold; 14. When the Ship Hit the Sand	Dean Calin - Tenor; Christie Dalby - Alto; Gina Dalby - Alto; Jonathan Krivitzky - Tenor; David Yondorf - Baritone

Additionally, some of Bounding Main's songs appear on other CDs:

- "High Barbaree": Lafitte's Return Vol. 2, produced by Bob Brinkman for Pirates for the Preservation of New Orleans Music, 2007.
- "High Barbaree": Renaissance Festival Podcast Compilation CD, produced by Marc Gunn, 2008.
- "Derelict": Lafitte's Return Vol. 3, produced by Bob Brinkman for Pirates for the Preservation of New Orleans Music, 2008.
- "Blow Liza Blow": Lafitte's Return Vol. 4, produced by Bob Brinkman for Pirates for the Preservation of New Orleans Music, 2008.
- "Blow Liza Blow": Goin' Back Home Vol. 3, produced by Quickstar Productions, 2009.
- "The Day of the Clipper": Score, performed with and produced by The Jolly Rogers, 2010.
- "Dogger Bank": "Bie Daip" Appingedam 10 jaar International Shanty Festival, produced by Bie Daip International Shanty Festival, 2011.
- "Away Rio": Beg, Borrow and Steal, performed with and produced by The Jolly Rogers, 2012.
- "Sugar in the Hold": Falmouth International Sea Shanty Festival 2017 CD, produced by the Falmouth International Sea Shanty Festival, 2017.
- "Sugar in the Hold": Festival du Chant de Marin Gouel Kan Ar Vartoloded (2019), produced by coop breizh, 2019.

== Soundtracks ==
Bounding Main's music has been included in the following soundtracks:

- The Polar Sea; Documentary by The Ontario Educational Communications Authority. "Northwest Passage" from the album Lost at Sea.
- Flotsam; Short Film by Noel Goodwin (screened at London Short Film Festival). "Mingulay Boat Song" from the album Maiden Voyage.

== See also ==
- Sea shanty
- A Cappella
