= David Coffin =

American musician

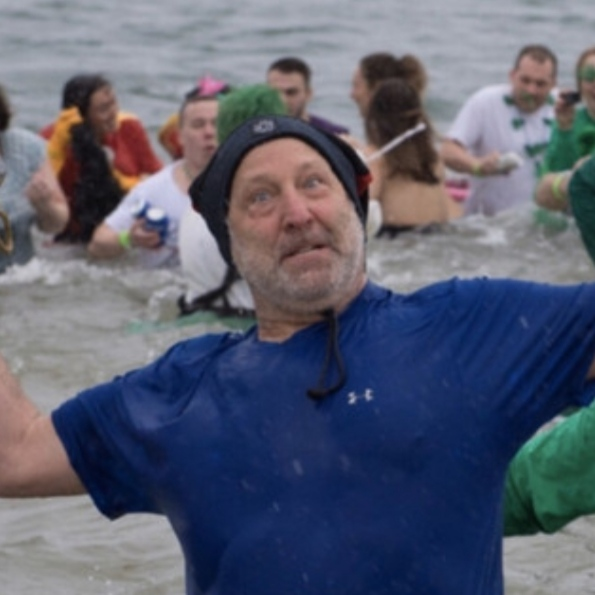
- Born: Gloucester, Massachusetts, United States
- Occupation: Folk musician
- Years active: 1980–present
- Relatives: Reverend William Sloane Coffin (father); Arthur Rubinstein (grandfather); Emil Młynarski (great-grandfather)

David Coffin is an American traditional folk musician specializing in early music and maritime music, based in Gloucester, Massachusetts, United States. He is the song leader for the Revels music programs in Cambridge, Massachusetts. He also presents music enrichment programs for schools throughout New England. One program is based on the history of the recorder, and the other is called Life at Sea: A Voyage in Song.

Coffin has a bass-baritone voice and plays various types of concertinas, recorders, and whistles, in addition to archaic instruments like the shawm, rackett, or gemshorn. He comes from a musical background: his father, Reverend William Sloane Coffin, studied to be a concert pianist with Nadia Boulanger in Paris, his grandfather was pianist Arthur Rubinstein, and his great-grandfather was Polish conductor Emil Młynarski. One of his ancestors was Tristram Coffin, an early English settler in Massachusetts and prominent part of the whaling industry of the 1600s who bought Nantucket Island in 1659 for thirty pounds and two beaver hats.

He leads several sea shanties, including the title song, onscreen in the 2019 Maine-set film Blow the Man Down.

In 2010, Coffin posted to YouTube a version of "Roll the Old Chariot" recorded at that year's Portsmouth Maritime Folk Festival, featuring him leading a crowd singing the song. It has over six million views as of December 2025.

== Discography ==
In addition to contributing to a variety of collaborative CDs for Revels Records and North Star Records (both are local New England recording labels), Coffin has also recorded four solo albums: Flight of Time, Nantucket Sleighride, Safe in the Harbour, and Last Trip Home which he recorded with his daughter Linnea. All feature traditional and maritime music, some of which is taken from the singing of Ewan MacColl and Stan Rogers. During the pandemic he also recorded three digital albums: one is a virtual hymn sing, one is a live broadcast Maritime Concert, and the third is called The Sound of Time. This last album is a composite of songs requested on TikTok. Every song was recorded in one take with no editing.

He is credited on four songs on the 2020 soundtrack album for Blow the Man Down.
