= Cyril Tawney =

English singer-songwriter (1930–2005)

- Born: 12 October 1930; Gosport, Hampshire, England
- Died: 21 April 2005 (aged 74) Exeter, Devon, England
- Genres: Folk, maritime

Cyril Tawney (12 October 1930 – 21 April 2005) was an English singer-songwriter and a proponent of the traditional songs of the Southwest of England (The West Country), as well as traditional and modern maritime songs.

== Biography and notable works ==
Tawney was born in Gosport, Hampshire, England. Perhaps because of the family tradition of maritime service, Tawney joined the Royal Navy at the age of sixteen, serving for thirteen years, several of which were spent in submarines. During this period he developed his lifelong interest in English traditional music.

While still in the Navy in 1957, he performed on an Alan Lomax radio show broadcast on Christmas Day, Sing Christmas and the Turn of the Year. He appeared on television on the following Easter Sunday. It went well and soon he had a weekly television spot and a networked show, Watch Aboard. Encouraged by these successes, Tawney left the Navy early in 1959 to become a full-time professional musician and broadcaster. He earned his living in this way for 44 years, making him Britain's longest-standing professional folksinger.

Tawney continued to work in broadcasting and had a weekly radio show, Folkspin. Meanwhile, he researched the traditional songs of southwest England and 20th Century Royal Navy songs. In the early 1960s, he established his first folk club in Plymouth, where he met his wife Rosemary. He founded the West of England Folk Centre, and was instrumental in setting up folk clubs in other places in the region. He is often referred to as the founding father of the West Country folk revival.

His song "The Oggie Man" written in 1959, appeared on the album A Cold Wind Blows on the Elektra ’66 label. It reappeared in 1971 on the Decca Record Company Ltd album, The World of Folk. The song tells the story of the demise of the 'Oggie Man' from the Devonport Naval Dockyard, at a time when old-fashioned "fast food" was being replaced by the more modern purveyors of hot dogs (and all) (the "big boys" of the song). The Oggie Man had until that time offered his oggies (pasties) to sailors returning from sea, or from shore leave, from a box at the Albert Gate of the dock. It has been suggested that the sale of oggies here dated back to the 1700s.

The first verse of "Oggie Man" runs:

And the rain's softly falling and the Oggie man's no more.
I can't hear him calling like I used to before
I came through the gateway and I heard the sergeant say
"The big boys are a coming, see their stands across the way"
And the rains softly falling and the Oggie man's no more...

In addition to presenting traditional material, Tawney composed a number of his own songs, the majority being written when he was in the Royal Navy and relating to that period – for example, "Chicken on a Raft", which follows the call and response style of sea shanties. The song makes reference to an unpopular dish served in the Royal Navy, consisting of fried egg on fried bread and called "chicken on a raft." The chorus is as follows:

Chicken on a raft on a Monday morning,
Oh, what a terrible sight to see,
The Dabtoes (Note: Slang term for an able bodied seaman rating) forrard and the dustmen (Note: Royal Navy slang for a stoker) aft,
Sittin' there a'pickin' at a chicken on a raft!

The song was recorded by The Young Tradition, on their 1967 EP also titled Chicken on a Raft. One of Tawney's other most popular original songs is "The Grey Funnel Line," also written about the Royal Navy. 'The Grey Funnel Line' was a nickname among Navy sailors for the Royal Navy, as if it were the same as any other shipping line. He wrote the song while serving aboard HMS Indefatigable, and reworked a verse from the American traditional song "Dink's Song" into the second verse of his song. "The Grey Funnel Line" has achieved enduring popularity, being covered by artists such as Lou Killen, The Clancy Brothers, Maddy Prior, June Tabor, The Longest Johns, Tom Lewis, and Jon Boden. It was even recorded by Dolly Parton, Emmylou Harris, and Linda Ronstadt and released on their album The Complete Trio Collection.

Tawney's song, "Sally Free And Easy", written in the late 1950s, was covered by numerous folk artists, including Carolyn Hester, Dorris Henderson and John Renbourn, Davey Graham, Pentangle, The Corries, Marianne Faithfull, Alan Stivell and Bob Dylan. The song is about an affair Tawney had with a girl who cheated on him.

"... and when he was out in Gibraltar during the war, he was in the submarine service and he had rather an unfortunate affair with a girl, who two-timed him and her name was Sally and he wrote a song about it called "Sally Free and Easy". – Roy Williamson, introducing the song on the album "The Corries in Concert"

Beginning in 1972, Tawney studied English and History at Lancaster University. After he graduated, he admitted to a master's degree from the Leeds University Institute of Dialect and Folklife Studies. He was the fieldworker at Keelby in Lincolnshire for the Atlas Linguarum Europae.

In 1987, Tawney's book Grey Funnel Lines: Traditional Song and Verse of the Royal Navy 1900 to 1970, was published by Routledge.

== Death and legacy ==
Tawney's last public performance was at Easter 2004, at the Lancaster Maritime Festival. He died of a bacterial infection at Exeter in 2005, after a long illness. Fellow English folk singer and maritime musician Tom Lewis wrote a tribute song to Tawney, titled "Cyril Said it All Before," honoring Tawney's significant influence on the traditional folk world.

== Discography ==
- The Outlandish Knight, 1969
- Children's Songs from Devon and Cornwall, 1970
- A Mayflower Garland, 1970
- Down Among the Barley Straw, 1971 (first released 1976)
- In Port (with The Yetties), 1972
- I Will Give My Love, 1973
- In the Naval Spirit, 1987 (MC)
- Round the Buoy, 1989 (MC)
- Sally Free and Easy, 1990 (MC)
- Sailor's Delight, 1990 (MC)
- Down the Hatch, 1994
- Man Of Honour, 1997
- Navy Cuts, 2001 (Compilation)
- Live at Holsteins: Chicago 1981, 2007
- The Song Goes On, 2014 (Compilation)

== Songs ==
Songs written by Cyril Tawney include:

- "Sammy's Bar"
- "Cheering the Queen"
- "Chicken on a Raft" (Note: Naval slang for any of several breakfast dishes involving a cooked egg and either toast or fried bread)
- "Five-foot Flirt"
- "Grey Funnel Line" (Note: The Royal Navy, contrasted with merchant ships with colorfully painted funnels)
- "The Ballad of Sammy's Bar"
- "Sally Free and Easy"
- "Stanley the Rat"
- "The Lean and Unwashed Tiffy" (Note: "Tiffy" was a casual term for "artificer" (skilled craftsman), and Tawney would explain that although Shakespeare was beyond his normal scope, the title and lyric draw on the Bard: In King John a character reporting the latest rumors says "Another lean unwash'd artificer / Cuts off his tale and talks of Arthur's death.")
- "The Suit of Grey"
- "The Oggie Man"
- "On a Monday Morning"

== Notes ==
Cyril Tawney himself said that dabtoes meant butter. Probably a contraction and corruption of "babies' toes", which was Jackspeak (Royal Navy slang) for knobs of butter. "The dustmen", also Jackspeak, refers to the salt and pepper shakers found on the other (after) side of the singers plate.
