= Northern Neck Shanty Singers =

American musical group

- Genres: Sea chanties

The Northern Neck Shanty Singers are a musical group based in the Northern Neck region of Virginia. The group performs a variety of sea chanties in the tradition of the African-American menhaden fisherman of the Virginia coast.
