= Debra Cowan =

Folk singer

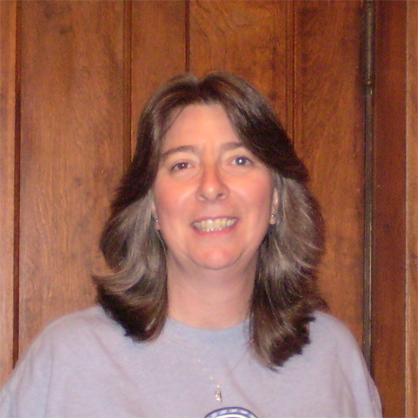
- Cowan in 2009

Background information
- Genres: Traditional folk music
- Label: Falling Mountain Music
- Website: http://www.debracowan.com

Debra Cowan is a folk singer based in Shrewsbury, Massachusetts.

== Biography ==
Cowan worked as a middle school mathematics teacher until in 1997, she decided to quit and pursue her desire to sing. For six months she lived in Edinburgh, Scotland where she learned the art of unaccompanied singing.

After her return to the US, in 1998, she began traveling and performing all over New England, in folk clubs or festivals like the Old Songs Festival and Broadstairs Folk Week.

Specializing primarily in traditional songs, often maritime-themed, she tours regularly in the United Kingdom and the United States. Rich Warren of the Midnight Special gave her CD, Fond Desire Farewell, an honorable mention in his list "Rich Warren's Past Favorites" for 2008.

== Present career ==
Cowan has released seven full-length recordings. Debra has collaborated with former Fairport Convention drummer Dave Mattacks, Brooks Williams and Bill Cooley. Her third recording, “Fond Desire Farewell”, was produced by Mattacks. One of her songs, Who Brought the Flood, was featured on a compilation album titled Still Moving Mountains: The Journey Home, which featured various artists including a song by Kathy Mattea.

She has performed on American live radio shows such as WFMT’s Folkstage, hosted by Rich Warren, WESU's "Acoustic Blender," and Tom May's River City Folk.

Debra is a member of the American Federation of Musicians Local 1000 and served as its Vice President from 2011 to 2016.

== Personal life ==
As of 2017, Cowan was living in Central Massachusetts with her husband, Kevin and their two cats, Hazel and Haku.

== Discography ==
Sourced from debracowan.com

=== Albums, full-length recordings ===
- The Long Grey Line (2001)
- The Songs and Ballads of Hattie Mae Tyler Cargill with Acie Cargill and Susan Brown (2001)
- Dad’s Dinner Pail and Other Songs From the Helen Hartness Flanders Collection (2005)
- Fond Desire Farewell (2009)
- Ballads Long & Short (2015)
- Women and the Sea (2021)

=== EPs ===
- Greening the Dark (2019)

=== Live albums ===
- Among Friends (2012)

=== Featured on ===
- RT: The Life and Music of Richard Thompson (bonus disc) (2006)
- Midwinter: The Folk Music and Traditions of Christmas and the Turning of the Year (2006)
- Still Moving Mountains: The Journey Home (2009)
- Dear Jean: Artists Celebrate Jean Ritchie (2014)
