= Salty Walt & the Rattlin' Ratlines =

American sea shanty performing group

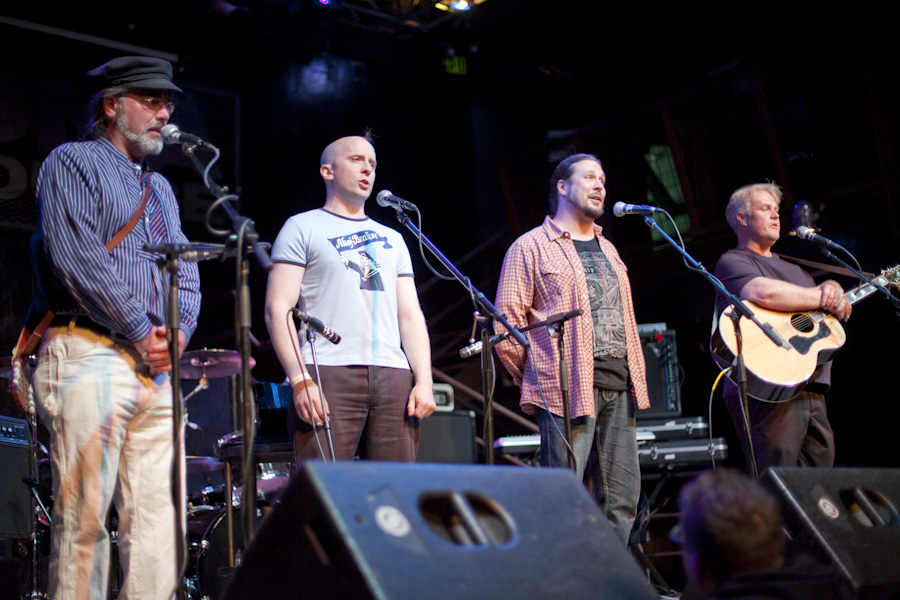
- Performing at DNA Lounge in San Francisco October 2009. From left to right: Griff Nelson, Jon Richardson, Walter Askew, and Daniel Briggs.

Background information
- Origin: San Francisco, CA, USA
- Genres: Maritime, Americana, Folk
- Years active: 2002–
- Members: Walter Askew, Daniel I. Briggs, Griff Nelson, and Jon Richardson
- Past members: Bryan Rhodes

Salty Walt & the Rattlin' Ratlines is a sea shanty performing group based in San Francisco, originally formed in 2003. The group consists of Walter "Salty Walt" Askew, Daniel Briggs, Griff Nelson, and Jon Richardson. On occasion, they also perform Celtic music and since at least 2005 have been performing a show of traditional carols and wassails on Boxing Day. They were voted San Francisco's "Best Sea Shanty Band" in 2006. The group appeared at the "Festival Maritim" in Vegesack, Germany in 2007.

In addition, group member Askew has also performed at the Mystic Seaport Sea Music Festival, most recently in 2009 and was a featured performer at Chicago Maritime Festival in 2008. He has also performed at sea music festivals in Europe including the 2006 SeaFest International Maritime Festival in Scarborough.

== Discography ==
- Log of the Albatross (2008)
- Salty Walt & the Rattlin' Ratlines' song, "Ambletown," appeared on Lafitte's Return Vol. 1, produced by Bob Brinkman for Pirates for the Preservation of New Orleans Music, 2007.
