= Dan Milner =

Irish singer (1945–2023)

Dan Milner was a singer of traditional Irish songs, a scholar-teacher and a writer. He died on September 27, 2023. Born Daniel Michael Milner on March 27, 1945 in Birmingham, England to an Irish mother, Nora Mary Cremin of Brosna, County Kerry, and an Irish-English father, Willam Milner, he was the younger brother of Liam Donal Padraig Milner (1940-2008), who was also a fine singer. The Milner family moved frequently following World War II, the result being the brothers grew up in far-flung localities including Birmingham; Ballybunion, County Kerry; Toronto, Canada and Brooklyn, New York.

Both parents were musical; his mother, a keen set dancer, and his father, a good singer who also played piano. William Milner taught his sons to sing a broad range of Irish national songs, a musical melange including Fenian and Republican pieces like “Skibbereen,” "McCaffrey" and "Kevin Barry," traditional ballads including “Barbara Allen,” and musical hall songs such as "The Wild Rover.” Together, Liam and Dan learned these plus Thomas Moore songs and a few Irish-American lyrics from Tin Pan Alley. He writes, "Though they came from different places and time periods, I link them together as Irish national songs in the sense that, individual taste aside, Irish people would agree they all are part of the country’s national heritage and consciousness."

Milner lengthened his song list from the mid-1960s through the present decade, learning Irish "big" ballads; and sea shanties, songs from the Canadian and New England lumber camps, and early Irish-American popular songs from a variety of sources including field recordings, original and secondary printed matter, and from many other singers. In New York City, he was fortunate to become well acquainted with two venerated older Irish songsters: Joe Heaney of Carna, County Galway and the celebrated Traveler, Margaret Barry of Cork city. Other early influences include Ewan MacColl, Dominic Behan and The Clancy Brothers.

He was a founding member of The Flying Cloud, who played at the Philadelphia Folk Festival in 1977 and recorded one eponymous LP for Adelphi Records the same year. He made three CDs for Folk-Legacy Records: Irish Ballads & Songs of the Sea (1998), featuring Lou Killen, The Irish Tradition and Mick Moloney; Irish in America (2001) with Bob Conroy and Brian Conway, Billy McComiskey, Pat Mangan and others; and Irish Songs from Old New England (2003), which features solo performances by Frank Harte, Len Graham, Jim MacFarland, Gordon Bok, Lou Killen and others. In 2009, Smithsonian Folkways Recordings, an arm of the Smithsonian Institution, released "Irish Pirate Ballads and Other Songs of the Sea," which features many of Irish America's foremost musicians and singers, including John Doyle, Joanie Madden, Susan McKeown, Mick Moloney, Brian Conway, Gabriel Donohue and Robbie O'Connell. The recording received two INDIE nominations. Irish Music magazine called it, "A tour de force... impeccably researched folk music with a big Irish heart..." Dirty Linen magazine wrote, "Milner is a compelling storyteller in song... a powerful narrative singer" and Time Out New York called him "A folksinger's folksinger". Dan is featured on Brian Conway's 2008 CD, "Consider the Source."

Milner was also a writer. The Unstoppable Irish: Songs and Integration of the New York Irish, 1783-1883 was published by the University of Notre Dame Press in 2019. His classic collection of 150 Irish and British folk songs, The Bonnie Bunch of Roses, was published by Oak in 1983. His reviews and feature magazine articles have been published by Irish Music and History/Ireland (Ireland), and The Living Tradition (Scotland) magazines. In the USA, he has written for The Log of Mystic Seaport, New York Irish History, Seaport, The Journal of New York Folklore and Sing Out!

Dan Milner has appeared on the radio in Ireland (RTÉ), England (BBC), Scotland (Celtic Music Radio) and the US (NPR).

While he sang, he also worked straight jobs, including 32 years within the airline industry, and shorter stints as a ranger in the National Park Service and a cartographer at the U.S. Census Bureau. In 2003, he returned to university for an M.A. in geography at Hunter College, and a Ph.D. in American Studies at the University of Birmingham. He has co-taught Storytelling in Song: The Ballad Tradition at New York University, and was an assistant professor of geography and history at St. John's University. Milner died on September 27, 2023.

== Discography ==
- Irish Ballads & Songs Of The Sea (1998), Folk-Legacy Records
- Irish In America (2001), Folk-Legacy Records
- Irish Songs From Old New England (2003), Folk-Legacy Records
- Irish Pirate Ballads And Other Songs Of The Sea (2009), Smithsonian Folkways
- Civil War Naval Songs (2011), Smithsonian Folkways
