= Cindy Kallet =

American singer-songwriter

Cindy Kallet is an American folk singer-songwriter from New England. She currently performs solo, with Grey Larsen, and as part of the trio of Kallet, Epstein & Cicone. Her first album, Working on Wings To Fly (1981), had songs about Martha's Vineyard and New England. That album was also voted as one of the top 100 folk albums of the century by WUMB.

Kallet studied biology at Bennington. Many of her songs feature imagery of wildlife. Kallet has performed on NPR shows such as A Prairie Home Companion and All Things Considered.

== Discography ==
- Working on Wings to Fly (1981, Folk-Legacy Records)
- Cindy Kallet 2 (1983, Folk-Legacy)
- Angels in Daring (with Ellen Epstein and Michael Cicone; 1988, Overall Music)
- Dreaming Down a Quiet Line (1989, Stone's Throw Music)
- Only Human (with Ellen Epstein and Michael Cicone; 1993, Overall Music)
- Neighbors (with Gordon Bok; 1996, Timberhead)
- Leave the Cake in the Mailbox (2000, Stone's Throw Music; winner of a 2004 Parents' Choice Gold Award)
- This Way Home (2000, Stone's Throw Music)
- Cross the Water (with Grey Larsen; 2007)
- Heartwalk (with Ellen Epstein and Michael Cicone; 2008)
- Ride in the Light (2024)
