= Jerry Bryant (songwriter) =

American singer-songwriter

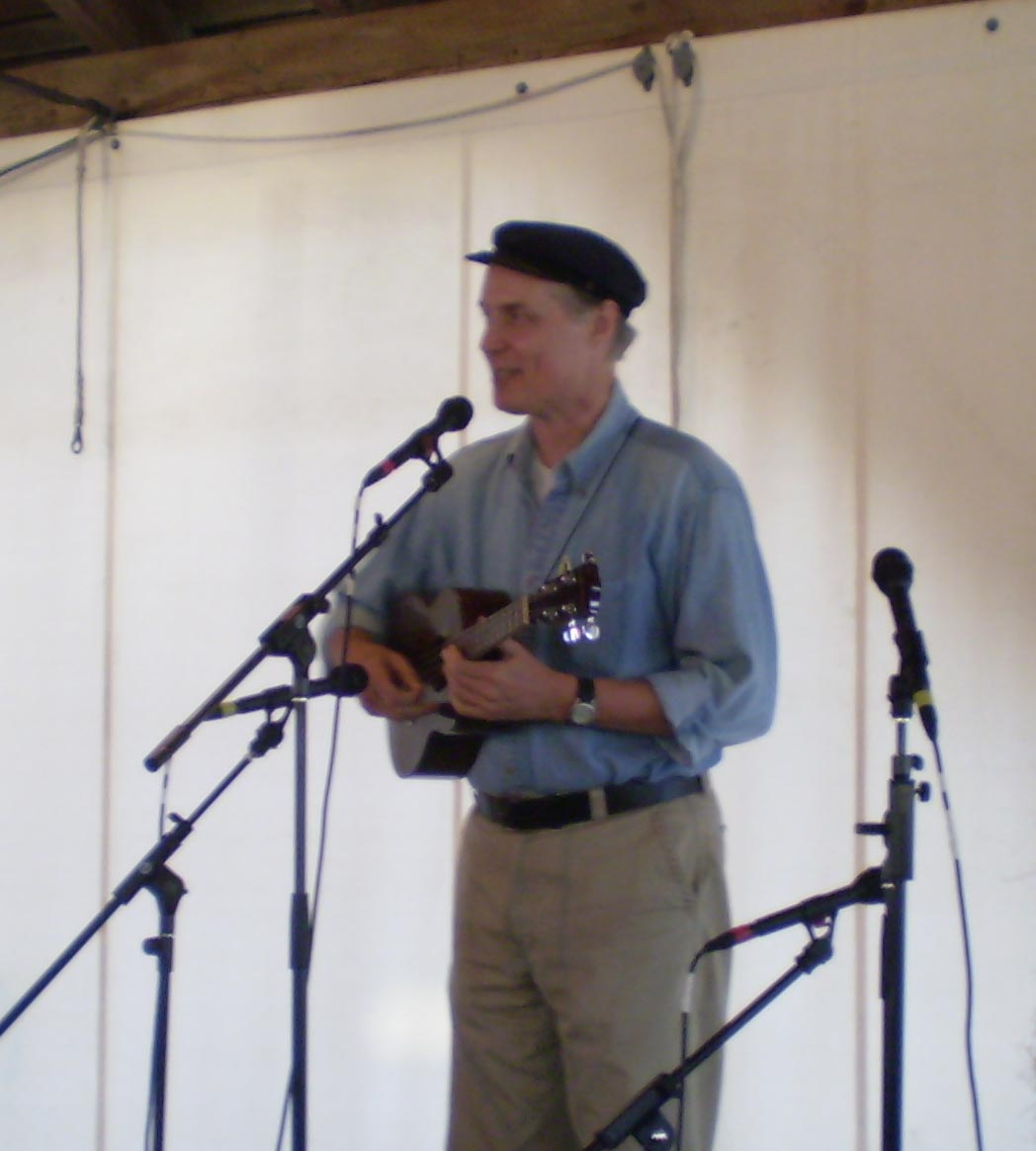
- Bryant performing at the Sea Music Festival in Mystic, CT in 2009

Background information
- Genres: Folk music
- Occupations: Musician, songwriter
- Instruments: Vocals, guitar, concertina, ukelele, banjo, rhythm bones

Jerry Bryant is an American folksinger specializing in maritime music. In addition to performing traditional songs, he also has written songs in a traditional style. Of his original songs, "The Ballad of Harbo and Samuelsen" is among his best known and has been recorded by several other performers, including William Pint and Felicia Dale, Forebitter, and Rick Lee (of Solomon's Seal).

Recordings:

- Roast Beef of Old England, songs of the British Navy in the 19th century (companion to Patrick O'Brian's novels)
- The Ballad of Harbo and Samuelsen, traditional songs and new compositions
