= Tom Lewis (songwriter) =

British singer-songwriter

Thomas John Lewis (born 16 April 1943) is a British singer and writer of nautical songs and sea shanties, some of whose works have become "folk standards." He's been recorded by over 40 other artists including Nathan Evans and has been called one of the finest exponents of contemporary nautical songs.

== Biography ==
Lewis was born in Belfast, Northern Ireland in 1943 and grew up in Gloucester, England. At age 16 he joined the Royal Navy as an engineering apprentice. He ended up serving in the navy for 24 years. Most of his service was spent on submarines, including with the First Submarine Squadron at Gosport.

In 1960, he transferred to a naval base in Scotland and began attending the Howff Folk Club in Dunfermline. At the club he was exposed to the works of folk artists such as Archie Fisher, Alex Glasgow, Ewan MacColl, Tom Paxton, and Louis Killen. Lewis was also influenced heavily by the music of Cyril Tawney. In 1980 while a chief petty officer in the navy, Lewis won a silver cup with his song "The Last Shanty" at the Services Folk Competition held at the Portsmouth Railway Inn Folk Club.

After leaving the navy in 1983, Lewis and his wife Lyn immigrated to British Columbia, Canada. They lived there until 2013. He currently lives in Bournemouth, England.

Lewis has travelled hundreds of thousands of miles in cars and motor homes while touring in Australia, Britain, Canada, and the United States. He has also performed at the Mystic Seaport Sea Music Festival and the Summerfolk Music and Crafts Festival. Currently much of his touring happens in the UK and Europe, where he performs with the Polish band QFTRY. He met the band in the late 1990s on the European festival circuit.

== Recordings ==
Lewis records most of his songs a cappella in the traditional style of sea shanties. However, he also plays the button accordion and ukulele. His songs cover a variety of topics ranging from the life of sailors onboard ships, the attraction and loneliness of the sea, to "traditional shanties and classic nautical poetry set to music."

His first solo album, issued in 1987, was Surfacing and included two early favorites among his recordings, "The Last Shanty" and "Marching Inland." Those two songs later appeared on the compilation CD A Taste of the Maritimes (1992), with the former tune published under the alternate title "A Sailor Ain't a Sailor." The song is a "lighthearted look at the changes in Navy life over the years". Surfacing was well received, with Geoff Butler in Canadian Folk Music calling the album "the sharpest collection of contemporary sea shanties I have ever run across."

In 1988 Lewis recorded and toured with William Pint and Felicia Dale. Lewis has also recorded two albums with QFTRY, Po!es Apart and Po!es Apart Too: The Song Goes On.

In 2008, he published his tunes and lyrics as Worth the Singin': the Tom Lewis Songbook.

Since 2015 he has been Festival Patron of the Gloucester Shanty Festival.

== Critical reception ==
Lewis has been called "one of North America's finest exponents of contemporary nautical songs," a "master of the sea shanty and the folk song sing-along" and "one of Canada's most unusual folk artists." A number of Lewis's songs have been said to deserve a "permanent place in the nautical repertoire," with his voice reminding former sailors of the "diesel engines (they have) also left behind—instant power and off with a full head of steam." Other reviewers have called Lewis's songs "infectious creations" that "are a throwback to an earlier tradition."

== Discography ==
- Surfacing (1987)
- Sea-Dog, See Dog! (1990)
- Making Waves (1992), with William Pint and Felicia Dale
- Tinker, Tailor, Soldier, ~~Sailor~~ Singer! (1995)
- Mixed Cargo (1999)
- Poles Apart (Polish Title: On, My Ocean) (2001) with a five-man shanty group from Poland (QFTRY). In English and Polish.
- 360° All Points of the Compass (2003)
- The Song Goes On (2011) Poles Part Too with QFTRY
- Demand Performance (2020) Double-CD: Seven (extended, 'live) stage performances, plus eleven new studio recordings.
