= The Johnson Girls =

American a cappella group

The Johnson Girls are an all-woman a-cappella song group based in New York City. They specialize in maritime music and perform songs from a melange of cultures including the United States, Britain, Ireland, Italy French-Canada, and the Caribbean. Named after a traditional African-American sea shanty (maritime work song), "The Johnson Girls," they formed as a quintet in 1997. The original members were Joy Bennett, Maggie Bye, Alison Kelley, Bonnie Milner, and Deirdre Murtha. Bye left the group after following the release of The Johnson Girls' second CD. Each of The Johnson Girls is also a member of the official maritime group of South Street Seaport Museum, The New York Packet.

Pete Seeger was blown away when he heard The Johnson Girls at the Ships to Save the Waters Concert (June 30, 2000), saying, "I didn't know women could sing like that!" The group has since appeared at major festivals in the United States, Canada, the UK, and Europe; these include the San Francisco Maritime National Historical Park, the Chicago Maritime Festival, the Champlain Festival, the Hudson River Festival, the Mystic Sea Music Festival and the Philadelphia Folk Festival (USA); the Lunenburg Folk Harbor Festival and Chants des Marins Saint-Jean-Port-Joli (Canada); and, in Europe, at festivals in Sidmouth, Warwick, Wadebridge and Broadstairs (England); Paimpol (France); Workum (Holland); and Lisbon (Portugal).

The Johnson Girls record for Folk-Legacy Records of Sharon, CT and their four CDs have received considerable public acclaim and solid reviews in folk music publications in the US and Europe.

== Discography ==
- The Johnson Girls (2000)
- On the Rocks (2004)
- Fire Down Below (2008)
- On Deck & Below (2014)
