= Bob Zentz =

American musician and educator

- Genres: folk, maritime
- Occupations: sonar man, musician, songwriter
- Instruments: singing, guitar, autoharp, lute, melodeon, mouth harp, banjo, concertina and mandolin.
- Years active: 1962–present
- Label: Folk-Legacy
- Website: http://www.bobzentz.com

Bob Zentz is an American musician and educator from Norfolk, Virginia who has been performing for more than thirty years. He is a guitarist and also plays the autoharp, lute, melodeon, mouth harp, banjo, concertina and mandolin. He specializes in historical and maritime music, and claims a repertoire of more than 2,000 songs.

Currently a resident of Norfolk, Virginia, in addition to his continuing performance activities Zentz also serves an instructor for the North Carolina Center for the Advancement of Teaching (NCCAT); and is a program developer and leader for Elderhostel along the Intracoastal Waterway. He also presents a program, "Homemade Music" to elementary school students.

== Early years ==
Zentz began performing professionally in Norfolk, Virginia in 1962, in the group "The Troubadours," with James Lee Stanley. While in college, he was a founding member of the Norfolk Campus of the College of William & Mary's "Minutemen" singers from 1962–64, and president of the Old Dominion College Folk Music Society from 1965-66.

Beginning in 1966, Zentz began two years serving as a sonar man in the U.S. Coast Guard, aboard the high-endurance cutter CGC Sebago. Upon leaving the Coast Guard in 1969 he was hired as a songwriter for the Smothers Brothers Comedy Hour. After the show was cancelled, Zentz remained in Los Angeles, teaching guitar at Long Beach City College and continuing to perform and write. In 1970 he won the William E. Oliver Songwriting Award in Los Angeles for his song, "Jeremy."

== Ramblin' Conrad's Guitar Shop & Folklore Center, Songmakers of Virginia ==
Following the 1971 San Fernando earthquake, Zentz returned to Norfolk where he created Ramblin' Conrad’s Guitar Shop & Folklore Center. It was named for the man who embodied Zentz's ideal of the singer, and the song—the late Norfolk country singer William Conrad Buhler. (Zentz also wrote a song about Buhler, "Ramblin' Conrad.")

Ramblin' Conrad’s Guitar Shop & Folklore Center became the hub for folk music and culture in Hampton Roads for 23 years before closing in 1995. The Ramblin' Conrad's experience was also on public radio WHRO-FM, Norfolk, through the program "In The Folk Tradition," which ran from 1977-2004. Additionally, in 1971 Zentz founded the Songmakers of Virginia (now known as the Tidewater Friends of Folk Music). Zentz modeled the Songmakers of Virginia after Songmakers of California, which he had become familiar with during his time in Los Angeles.

== Teaching and performance ==
In 1971, Zentz began teaching folk music classes in Old Dominion University’s Rainbow Program. In 1971 he created the Old Dominion Folk Festival, which he ran until 1981. Beginning in 1980 he began appearing at the Virginia State Fair, appearing for his 26th year consecutive year as resident performer in the Heritage Village in September 2007.

In 1982 Zentz appeared on PBS's program "A Prairie Home Companion."

From 1982 to 1991, Zentz crewed on and performed in connection with Pete Seeger's Hudson River sloop "Clearwater," repairing the Hudson River and spreading the word about preserving the waterways.

== Festivals ==
In 1997, Zentz represented America and its folk traditions at the Shanty Tour in Finland. In 2002 he was an instructor at the inaugural Common Ground, Scotland and performed at the Scottish National Folk Festival. Also in 2002, he composed and performed "Ode to the Schooner Virginia" at the keel-laying ceremony at the Mariner's Museum in Newport News, and performed it again in 2004 at the launching ceremony.

In 2004, Zentz was a featured U.S. artist at the Australian National Folk Festival in Canberra and performed in Auckland and Wellington for the New Zealand Maritime Museums. Also in 2004, he was a featured performer at the Smithsonian Folklife Festival. Since that time Zentz has also been a regular member of the faculty each summer at Common Ground on the Hill, held at McDaniel College in Westminster, Maryland.

== Programs ==
In 1995, Zentz created the program, "Life of the 19th Century Mariner" for the Mariners Museum in Newport News. In 2003, Zentz was a founding member of the Outer Banks Opry. In 2004, Zentz was music consultant and performer for the multimedia theater experience, "Chesapeake Celebration." Also in 2004, he received a grant from the Chesapeake Bay Foundation to present "Music of the Chesapeake" in Virginia Schools.

== Covers and publications of Bob Zentz songs ==
Dozens of performers have covered his original compositions and three of them have been included in Rise Up Singing, a songbook published by Sing Out! magazine. The three songs in Rise Up Singing are: "Sweet Song of Yesterday," "This Old Earth," and "When All Thy Names."

== Awards and honors ==
In 1970 won the William E. Oliver Songwriting Award in Los Angeles for the song, "Jeremy."

In 1992, received the John Sears Award for Community Service from Fest events and the City of Norfolk.

In 2004, profiled on the public television program, Virginia Currents in recognition of his contributions to music and the community, at home and abroad.

== Discography ==
- Mirrors and Changes (1974)
- Beaucatcher Farewell
- It's About Time
- Hove-to, and Drifting . . .
- Scuttlebutt/Tall Ships (With Rick Epping & Rick Lee)
- Closehauled on the Wind of a Dream (2007)
- Horizons
- Musical Virginiana Vol. 1 (with Jeanne McDougall)
- Homemade Music (with Jeanne McDougall)
- Included in compilations:
  - Rachel Carson Anthology (includes song, "Horizons") (2007)
  - Coastal Folk (includes song, "Horizons")
  - Ocrafolk III (includes song, "Sea Dream")
  - Thomas Point Light (includes song, "The Light from the Lighthouse" and "This Old Bay.")
