= William Pint and Felicia Dale =

American folk musicians

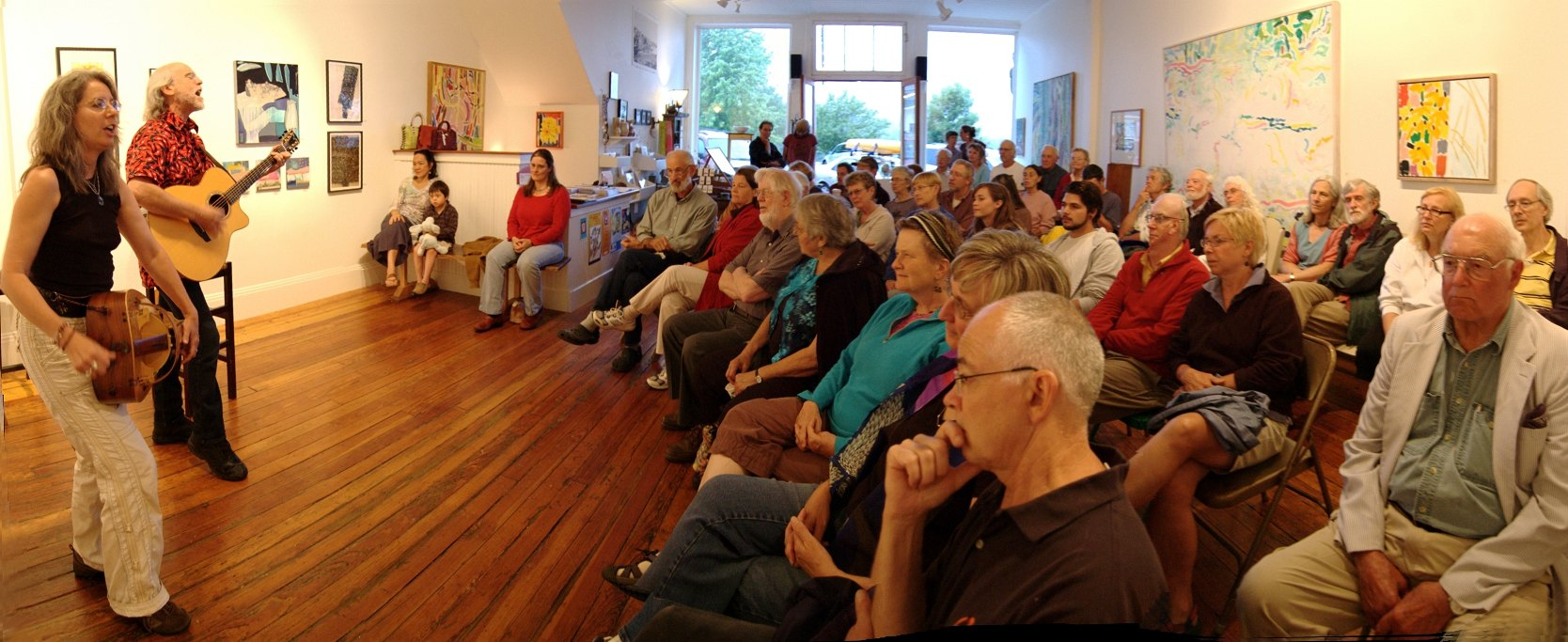
Felicia Dale and William Pint performing live in 2009.

William Pint and Felicia Dale (often billed as Pint & Dale) are folk musicians based in Seattle. Known primarily for nautical music and sea chanties, they are among the best-known performers in that genre in the United States. Their albums have been favorably reviewed in Dirty Linen magazine, Sing Out! magazine, and Folk Roots magazine. They tour regularly in the UK as well as the United States and have also performed in The Netherlands, Germany, Poland and Estonia. Between 1988 and 1991 they performed with Canadian performer Tom Lewis.

Felicia Dale, born January 1, 1958, grew up on Vashon Island in Puget Sound. Her primary instrument is the hurdy-gurdy. She has been performing professionally since she was sixteen years old. She is also a published short-story author with stories included in the anthologies New Amazons (ISBN 0-88677-887-5) and Warrior Princesses (ISBN 0-88677-783-6).

William Pint, born December 20, 1953, grew up in Milwaukee, Wisconsin. His primary instruments are the guitar and mandola. In the 1970s he was a member of the acoustic folk group Silmaril and recorded Given Time or the Several Roads which has recently been re-released as Voyage of the Icarus by Locust Records. He moved to Seattle in 1977 where he was a member of the bands Morrigan, Copperfield, and Ellipsis, as well as a brief stint in the humour-oriented band What's All This, Then! Morrigan was recorded by Folkways Records in 1979, and Ellipsis by Flying Fish Records in 1984.

== Discography ==
- Port of Dreams
- Making Waves (with Tom Lewis)
- Hearts of Gold (Waterbug label)
- Round the Corner (Waterbug label)
- When I See Winter Return (Waterbug label)
- Hartwell Horn (Waterbug label)
- White Horses (Waterbug label)
- Seven Seas (Waterbug label)
- The Set of the Sail (Waterbug label)
- Blue Divide (Waterbug label)
- Midnight on the Seas (Waterbug label)
