= The Mary Ellen Carter =

Song by Stan Rogers

Song by Stan Rogers

from the album Between the Breaks ... Live!
- Released: 1979
- Length: 5:27
- Label: Fogarty's Cove Music
- Songwriter: Stan Rogers
- Producer: Paul Mills

"The Mary Ellen Carter" is a song written and first recorded by Stan Rogers in 1979. It tells the story of a heroic effort to salvage a sunken ship, the eponymous Mary Ellen Carter, by members of her crew.

== Original version ==
The song chronicles the efforts to salvage the ship, implying that it will be raised on the following day:

But we've patched her rents, stopped her vents,
Dogged hatch and porthole down,
Put cables to her, 'fore and aft
And girded her around

Tomorrow, noon, we hit the air
And then take up the strain
And make the Mary Ellen Carter rise again.

The song ends with an inspirational message to people "to whom adversity has dealt the final blow": Never give up, and, "like the Mary Ellen Carter, rise again!"

The song appears on three of Rogers' albums:

- Between the Breaks...Live!
- Home In Halifax
- The Very Best of Stan Rogers

== Cover versions by notable artists ==
- Jim Post began performing the song in the 1980s
- Makem and Clancy began performing the song in the 1980s, recording it on their 1986 album We've Come a Long Way
- The English a cappella trio Artisan popularised their harmony version in UK folk circles throughout the 1980s and 1990s
- Portland, Maine based folk group Schooner Fare recorded the song on their 1983 album Alive!.
- Ian Robb recorded it with the other members of Finest Kind on his album From Different Angels.
- It was recorded by the seven piece Newfoundland band The Irish Descendants as part of the tribute album Remembering Stan Rogers: An East Coast Tribute, performed by various artists at Rogers' favorite venue in Halifax, Dalhousie University
- The song was covered by Alex Beaton and featured on his The Water is Wide album, released in 1995.
- The song was covered by American folk-punk band Mischief Brew on a 7-inch split released in 2013.
- Jacob Lewis covered the song on his 2019 album Home Sweet Home.
- The Bristolian folk group The Longest Johns released a rendition of the song in 2020.

== Legacy ==
As a tribute to Stan Rogers, "The Mary Ellen Carter" has been sung to close the annual Winnipeg Folk Festival every year since his death.

During the finale of the Annual Summerfolk Music and Crafts Festival held in Owen Sound, Ontario, "The Mary Ellen Carter" is sung together by many of the weekend festival's performers and the audience in tribute to Stan Rogers, who was one of the festival's original supporters and after whom the main stage was named.

== Connection to the sinking of the Marine Electric ==
On February 12, 1983 the ship Marine Electric was carrying a load of coal from Norfolk, Virginia to a power station in Somerset, Massachusetts. The worst storm in forty years blew up that night, and the ship sank at about four o'clock in the morning on February 13. The ship's chief mate, 59-year-old Robert M. "Bob" Cusick, was trapped in the deckhouse as the ship went down. His snorkeling experience helped him avoid panic and swim to the surface, but he was left to spend the night alone on a partially deflated lifeboat he eventually reached, in water barely above freezing and air much colder. Huge seas washed over him, and each time he was not sure that he would ever reach the surface again to breathe. Battling hypothermia, he was tempted to allow himself to fall unconscious and be washed away. Just then he remembered the concluding stanzas of "The Mary Ellen Carter".

And you, to whom adversity has dealt the final blow
With smiling bastards lying to you everywhere you go
Turn to, and put out all your strength of arm and heart and brain
And like the Mary Ellen Carter, rise again.

Rise again, rise again—though your heart it be broken
Or life about to end.
No matter what you've lost, be it a home, a love, a friend,
Like the Mary Ellen Carter, rise again.

As Cusick tells in One Warm Line, a documentary about Rogers, he started to sing it and soon was alternately shouting out "Rise again, rise again" and holding his breath as the seas washed over him. At seven o'clock that morning a Coast Guard helicopter spotted him and pulled him to safety. Only three men of the thirty-four who had been aboard survived the wreck. After his ordeal, Cusick wrote a letter to Stan Rogers telling him what had happened and crediting the song with saving his life. In response, Rogers invited Cusick to attend what turned out to be the second-to-last concert Rogers ever performed. Cusick lived another 30 years, and his testimony and activism in the aftermath of the accident spurred far-reaching maritime safety reforms.

== Published versions ==
- Rise Up Singing pp. 203–204
