= For the Family =

Studio album by Stan Rogers
- Released: 1983
- Recorded: October–November 1982
- Studios: The Grant Avenue Studio, Hamilton, Ontario
- Genre: Folk
- Length: 36:10
- Label: Folk Tradition

Stan Rogers chronology
Northwest Passage (1981)	For the Family (1983)	From Fresh Water (1984)

Professional ratings
Review scores
Source	Rating
Allmusic	4/5 stars

For the Family is a 1983 studio album by Canadian folk artist Stan Rogers.

In a departure from Rogers's earlier collections of typically original compositions on his own Fogarty's Cove label, this album features renditions of traditional Canadian folk songs as well as songs written by Rogers's uncle Lee Bushell and grandfather Sidney Bushell. In the liner notes, Rogers's brother Garnet Rogers writes, "A project of this type was one that [Stan] wanted to do for a long time. We often discussed producing our own album, and we were intrigued with the idea of doing an album without the pressure on Stan to write new songs—an album for the fun of it." It was originally released on WRDV DJ Tor Jonassen's "Folk Tradition" record label, and subsequently re-released by Gadfly Records. It is a studio album, with backing performances by Garnet Rogers on fiddle, and bassist Jim Morison.

The album was recorded in October and November 1982 and was released only weeks after Stan Rogers perished in a fire on board an Air Canada flight in June 1983.

For this recording, Garnet created an arrangement of Charles Kingsley's poem Three Fishers which has since been taken into the repertoire of several other musicians. He writes, "Stan brought this poem to rehearsal one day with the idea we could work it into an a-cappella tune. I perverted his fragment of melody to my own ends."

== Track listing ==
1. Lookout Hill (music & lyrics: Lee Bushell)
2. Cliffs of Baccalieu (music & lyrics: traditional)
3. Strings and Dory Plug (music & lyrics: Lee Bushell)
4. The Badger Drive (music: traditional; lyrics: John V. Devine)
5. Cape St. Mary's (music & lyrics: Otto P. Kelland)
6. Two Bit Cayuse (music & lyrics: traditional)
7. Scarborough Settler's Lament (music & lyrics: traditional)
8. Yeastcake Jones (music: traditional; lyrics: Sidney Bushell)
9. Up in Fox Island (music & lyrics: Lee Bushell)
10. Three Fishers (music: Garnet Rogers & Stan Rogers; lyrics: Charles Kingsley)
