= Between the Breaks ... Live! =

Between the Breaks . . . Live!

Live album by Stan Rogers
- Released: 1979
- Recorded: April 19–April 22, 1979
- Genre: Folk
- Length: 43:26
- Label: Fogarty's Cove Music
- Producer: Paul Mills

Stan Rogers chronology
Turnaround (1978)	Between the Breaks . . . Live! (1979)	Northwest Passage (1981)

Alternative cover
- Borealis reissue

Professional ratings
Review scores
Source	Rating
Allmusic	link

Between the Breaks ... Live! is a 1979 folk music album by Stan Rogers. It was recorded at The Groaning Board in Toronto, Ontario.

The album was included in a series of reissued versions of Stan Rogers albums on Borealis Records. The Borealis releases were given completely new cover artwork.

== Track listing ==
1. The Witch of the Westmorland
  - Written by Archie Fisher.
2. Barrett's Privateers
3. First Christmas
4. The Mary Ellen Carter
5. The White Collar Holler
  - Written by Nigel Russell
6. The Flowers of Bermuda
7. Rolling Down to Old Maui
  - A traditional sea song.
8. Harris and the Mare
9. Delivery Delayed

== Personnel ==
Stan Rogers: six string and twelve string acoustic guitars, vocals.
Garnet Rogers: violin, flute, vocals.
David Alan Eadie: electric bass, pennywhistle, vocals.
Grit Laskin: long-necked mandolin, concertina, Northumbrian smallpipes, vocals.
Curly Boy Stubbs: acoustic guitar, vocals.
