= Three Fishers =

Poem by Charles Kingsley

"The Three Fishers" is a poem and a ballad written in 1851 by English poet, novelist, and Anglican priest Charles Kingsley.

It was first set to music by English composer John Hullah shortly thereafter. Robert Goldbeck also set it to music in a version published in 1878. Some more recent recordings of the song follow a musical arrangement created by the Canadian folksinger Garnet Rogers and recorded by his brother Stan in the 1980s.

The poem tells the story of three fishermen who sail out to sea, and lose their lives when overtaken by a storm.

== The poem ==
Three fishers went sailing out into the West,
Out into the West as the sun went down;
Each thought on the woman who lov’d him the best;
And the children stood watching them out of the town;
For men must work, and women must weep,
And there's little to earn, and many to keep,
Though the harbour bar be moaning.

Three wives sat up in the light-house tower,
And they trimm’d the lamps as the sun went down;
They look’d at the squall, and they look’d at the shower,
And the night wrack came rolling up ragged and brown!
But men must work, and women must weep,
Though storms be sudden, and waters deep,
And the harbour bar be moaning.

Three corpses lay out on the shining sands
In the morning gleam as the tide went down,
And the women are weeping and wringing their hands
For those who will never come back to the town;
For men must work, and women must weep,
And the sooner it's over, the sooner to sleep—
And good-by to the bar and its moaning.

== History ==
When Charles Kingsley was a boy, his father was rector of Clovelly, a small seaside parish on the coast of north Devon. Kingsley was often present when the herring fleet was put out to sea, an event often accompanied by a short religious ceremony for which the fishermen, their wives and their families were all present. Kingsley recalled the story at the end of a weary day and wrote the poem.

Musicologist Derek B. Scott credits Kingsley as one of the founders of the Christian Socialist Movement in the United Kingdom, noting that the line, "Men must work and women must weep," became a catchphrase. Also according to Scott, the line sung as a refrain after each stanza, "And the harbour bar be moaning," refers to, "the belief that it was a bad omen if the tide made a moaning sound as it receded over the sand bar that kept the harbour waters still." A performance by Scott using Hullah's musical arrangement is available online.

The song was quite popular during much of the Victorian era. In 1883, English painter Walter Langley created "For Men Must Work and Women Must Weep", a watercolour painting based on Kingsley's poem. The song (as arranged by Hullah) was frequently sung by popular vocalists such as Antoinette Sterling and Charlotte Sainton-Dolby, each of whom gave distinctly different interpretations. Sterling once explained: "Although I had never been to sea in a storm, and had never even seen fishermen, I somehow understood that song of 'The Three Fishers' by instinct. On reading the poem over for the first time no one could know from the opening that the men would necessarily be drowned. Therefore it was a story. But there is a natural tendency to anticipate an unhappy ending; hence it was customary to begin the song so mournfully that everybody realised from the very start what the end was going to be. Madame Sainton-Dolby, for instance, used to sing it sorrowfully from the first note to the last. I had never seen or known of anyone who was drowned, but that mysterious instinct was so strong that I could not foreshadow the finish. When, therefore, I started, I always made the first verse quite bright. I must believe it was the true way, since both the poet and composer endorsed my rendering of it." According to a text by Harold Simpson, when Sterling finished performing the song at her London debut, "there was a tumult of applause; people rose in their places and cheered, waving hats and handkerchiefs in their excitement."

== Recordings ==
There have been a number of modern recordings of the song since the American folk music revival. At that time it was recorded by Richard Dyer-Bennet for his 1955 album, Dyer-Bennet, Volume 1, and later by Joan Baez for the 1963 album Joan Baez in Concert, Part 2. They each performed a version using Hullah's arrangement.

In the 1980s, Canadian folk singer Stan Rogers recorded a version with a musical arrangement by his brother, Garnet Rogers, for the album, For the Family; it was subsequently re-recorded by Stan's son Nathan on his 2004 album True Stories. Many more recent recordings closely follow the arrangement by Rogers, such as The Duhks on their Migrations album (2006), and The Once on their self-titled 2010 release, but each giving their own rendering.

The village museum in Clovelly, where Kingsley was inspired to write the poem, features a life-sized model of Kingsley sitting at a desk writing the poem. When visitors enter the room, a motion sensor triggers a voice recording of the poem, read by actor and village resident Joss Ackland.

== In Film ==
- The Unchanging Sea (1910), a short film by D.W. Griffith, was inspired by the "Three Fishers" poem. The first stanza is used in the film itself.
- And Women Shall Weep - 1960
- The poem is recited by J. Edward Bromberg in the 1946 film Queen of the Amazons.
- Quoted by actress Ester Howard in the 1941 film "Sullivan's Travels."
- It was also used in Ralph Fiennes's film The Invisible Woman (2013), about Charles Dickens and his mistress Ellen Ternan.
