= Nathan Rogers =

Canadian folk musician/songwriter (born 1979)

- Born: Nathan Prescott Warren Rogers; July 16, 1979 (age 47); Hamilton, Ontario
- Genre: Folk
- Instruments: Guitar, vocals, stomp box
- Years active: 2004–present
- Labels: Halfway Cove; Borealis Records
- Formerly of: Dry Bones
- Website: nathanrogers.ca

Nathan Rogers (born July 16, 1979 in Hamilton, Ontario) is a Canadian folk musician/songwriter.

== Early life ==
Rogers is the son of Stan and Ariel Rogers. His father, a folk musician and songwriter, died in a fire aboard Air Canada Flight 797 on June 2, 1983.

Rogers was immersed in the songwriting tradition from an early age, gaining a keen appreciation for singers and songwriters like Joni Mitchell, Gordon Lightfoot and Leonard Cohen.

Early musical experience consisted of singing in school choirs and plays. While attending the boarding school Appleby College in Oakville, Rogers worked with the Appleby Boys Choir, a world-class boys choir, occasionally touring as far afield as New Orleans. Rogers completed his high school education at Westdale Secondary School in 1997 and moved to Winnipeg, Manitoba in 1998. Rogers worked with Mitch Podolak on the World Next Door Festival then stayed in Winnipeg to pursue a degree in Religious Studies.

== Career ==
In 2004, Rogers approached Rick Fenton to produce his debut album, True Stories. Around the time Rogers released True Stories, he began to develop his talent at throat singing. He has since added a stomp box to his shows to provide rhythm and regularly features Mongolian and Tuvan throat singing. Rogers has been to Iqaluit to study Inuit throat singing and to teach the Tuvan styles.

In 2009, Rogers released his second album, The Gauntlet. The album is supported by Fogarty's Cove Music and was released through Borealis Records.

In 2010, Rogers was aboard the Clipper Adventurer when she ran aground on an uncharted rock in Coronation Gulf, Nunavut.

More recently, Rogers has teamed up with Leonard Podolak and JD Edwards to create a new folk music power trio called Dry Bones. In 2011, they released the band's first self-titled CD.

In 2017, American blues and Americana artist Watermelon Slim recorded a CD titled Golden Boy in Winnipeg, produced by Scott Nolan, that included an a cappella version of Stan Rogers' "Barrett's Privateers." Nathan Rogers honored Slim by being part of the men's singing group backing him in this recording.

== Discography ==
- True Stories (2004)
- The Gauntlet (2009)
- Dry Bones (2011)
