= Blue Dolphin =

1925 schooner boat made popular by a Stan Rogers song

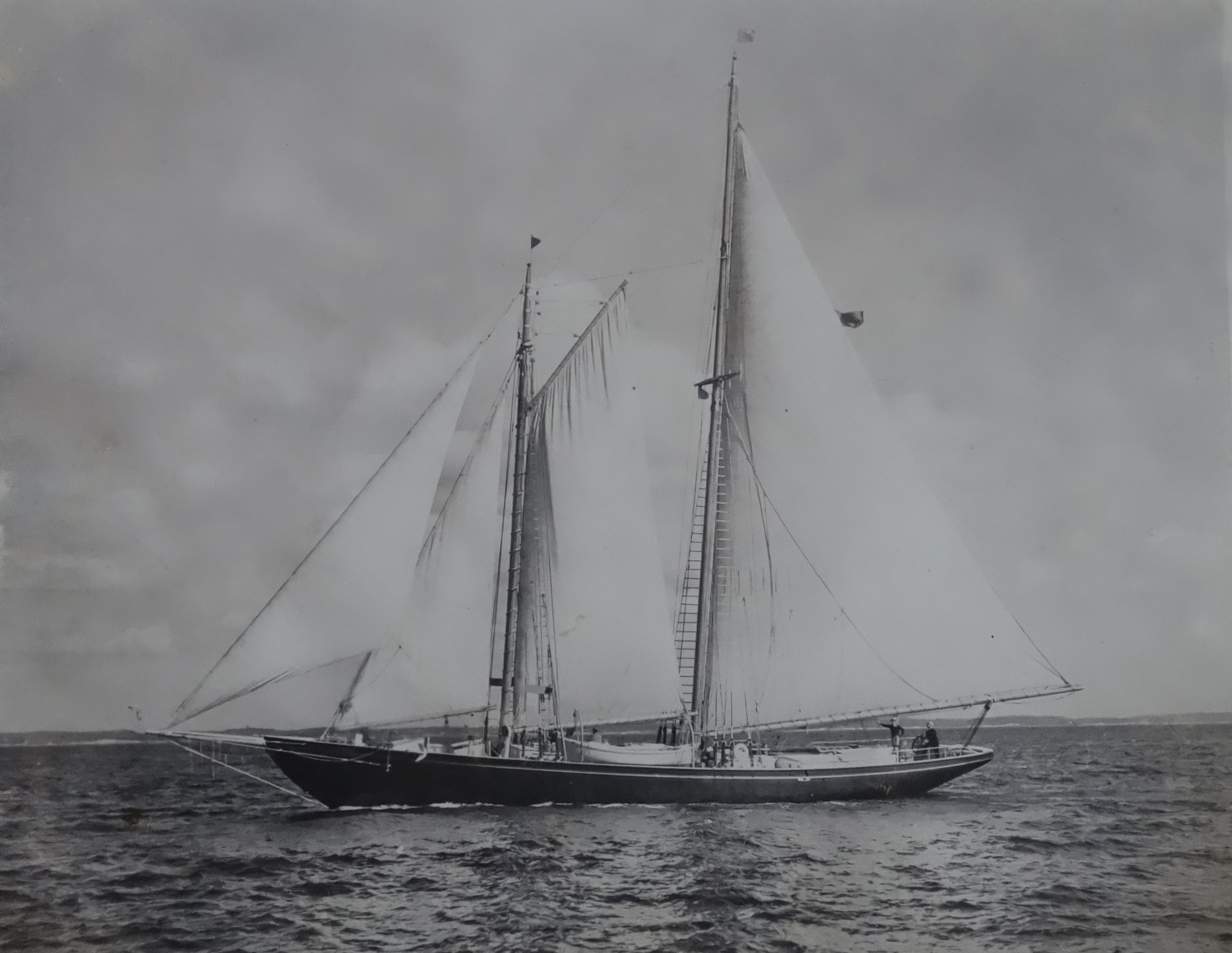
- Blue Dolphin under sail

History

Canada
- Name: Blue Dolphin
- Owner: S.H. Velie (Blue Dolphin Limited)
- Port of registry: Shelburne, Nova Scotia, 1928-1935
- Builder: Shelburne Shipbuilders Limited
- Launched: 1926
- Identification: official number 152577
- Fate: Sold to Amory Coolidge, Boston in 1933

United States
- Acquired: 17 March 1942
- In service: 6 April 1942
- Out of service: 28 June 1945
- Stricken: 11 July 1945
- Fate: Sold

General characteristics
- Type: Schooner
- Displacement: 91 tons
- Length: 99 ft 8 in (30.38 m)
- Beam: 22 ft 5 in (6.83 m)
- Draft: 12 ft (3.7 m)
- Speed: 8 knots (15 km/h; 9.2 mph)
- Complement: 8

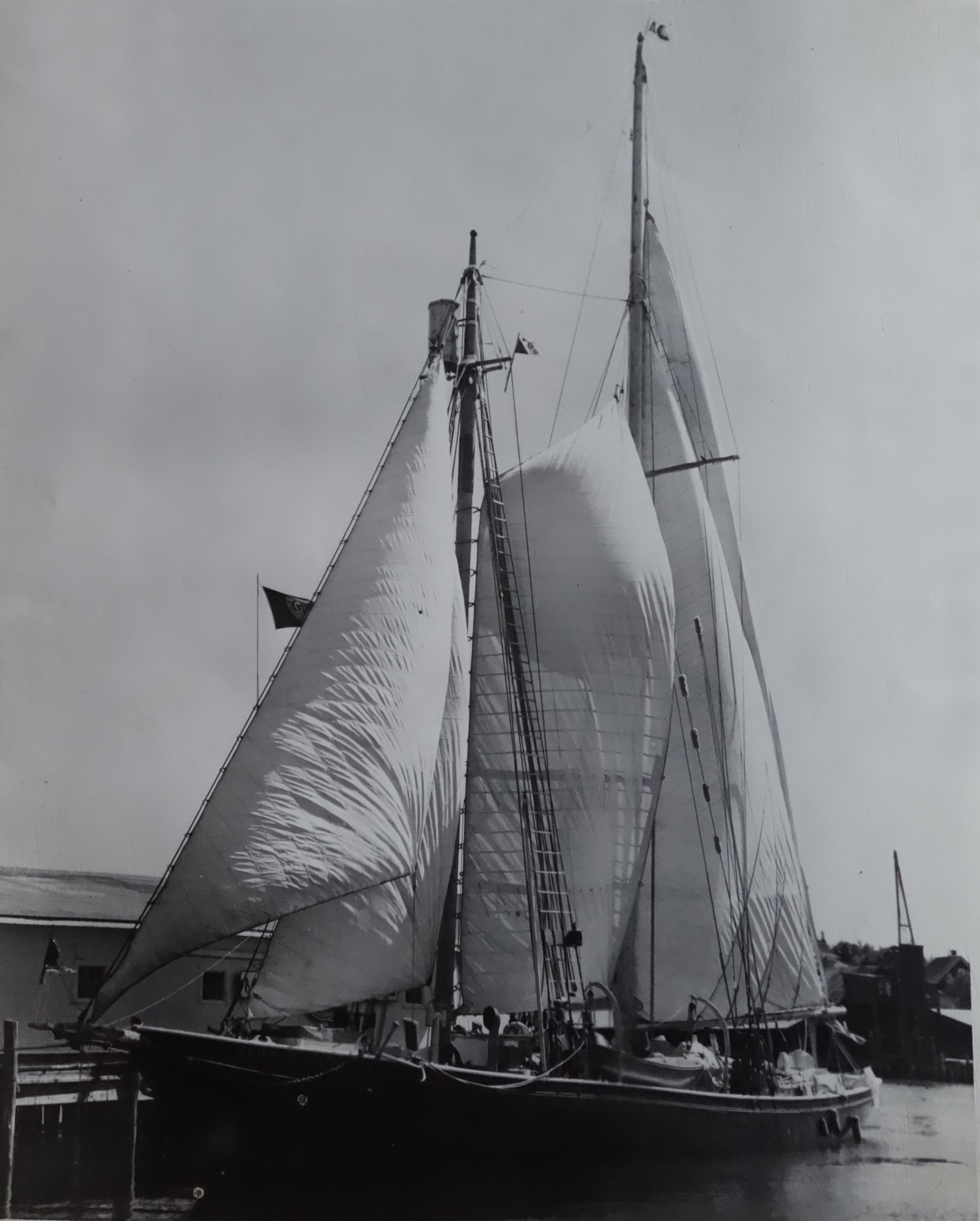
Blue Dolphin in port

Blue Dolphin was an auxiliary schooner built in 1926 at Shelburne, Nova Scotia by the Shelburne Shipbuilding Company as an adventure yacht. She served as a United States Navy auxiliary and given the hull number IX-65 in World War II. The vessel then served as a postwar research vessel made famous by a Stan Rogers song.

== Construction and early career ==
Blue Dolphin was designed by the famous naval architect William Roue, designer of the famous racing schooner Bluenose. Sometimes called a sister ship to Bluenose, Blue Dolphin was in fact considerably smaller but reflected the overall style of Bluenose. Blue Dolphin was built for Stephen Henry Velie Jr of Kansas City, Missouri. A rich businessman interested in "long foreign voyages," Felie ordered a fishing schooner style vessel with an extra reinforced hull but luxurious cabins in place of a fishing hold. She was registered at Shelburne, Nova Scotia for the beginning of her career which her owner used as a base for adventure trips to the north.

In 1933, Blue Dolphin was purchased by Boston businessman Amory Coolidge (1895–1952) who transferred her registry to Boston, Massachusetts in 1935.

== US Navy service ==
Blue Dolphin was acquired by the United States Navy on 17 March 1942 from Amory Coolidge for the nominal fee of $1.00. She was designated a miscellaneous auxiliary, IX 65 and placed in service at the Section Base, Boston on 6 April 1942. Blue Dolphin spent the next 38 months serving as station vessel at Casco Bay, Maine. Shortly after Germany surrendered, she was placed out of service at Boston on 28 June 1945. Her name was struck from the Navy list on 11 July 1945, and she was delivered to the Maritime Commission's War Shipping Administration for disposal on 14 September 1945.

== Research vessel ==
After the war, Blue Dolphin was apparently sold to a Mr. David C. Nutt who was involved in oceanographic research in conjunction with various universities, civilian research organizations, and the Office of Naval Research. Mr. Nutt was also a naval reserve commander. On 3 April 1949, she was designated as "suitable for use as a naval auxiliary in time of war" by the Chief of Naval Operations. She was also authorized to fly the Naval Reserve Yacht pennant. The last information available on her indicates that she continued to conduct oceanographic and hydrobiological research out of Boothbay Harbor, Maine, ito mid 1954.

== Private use ==
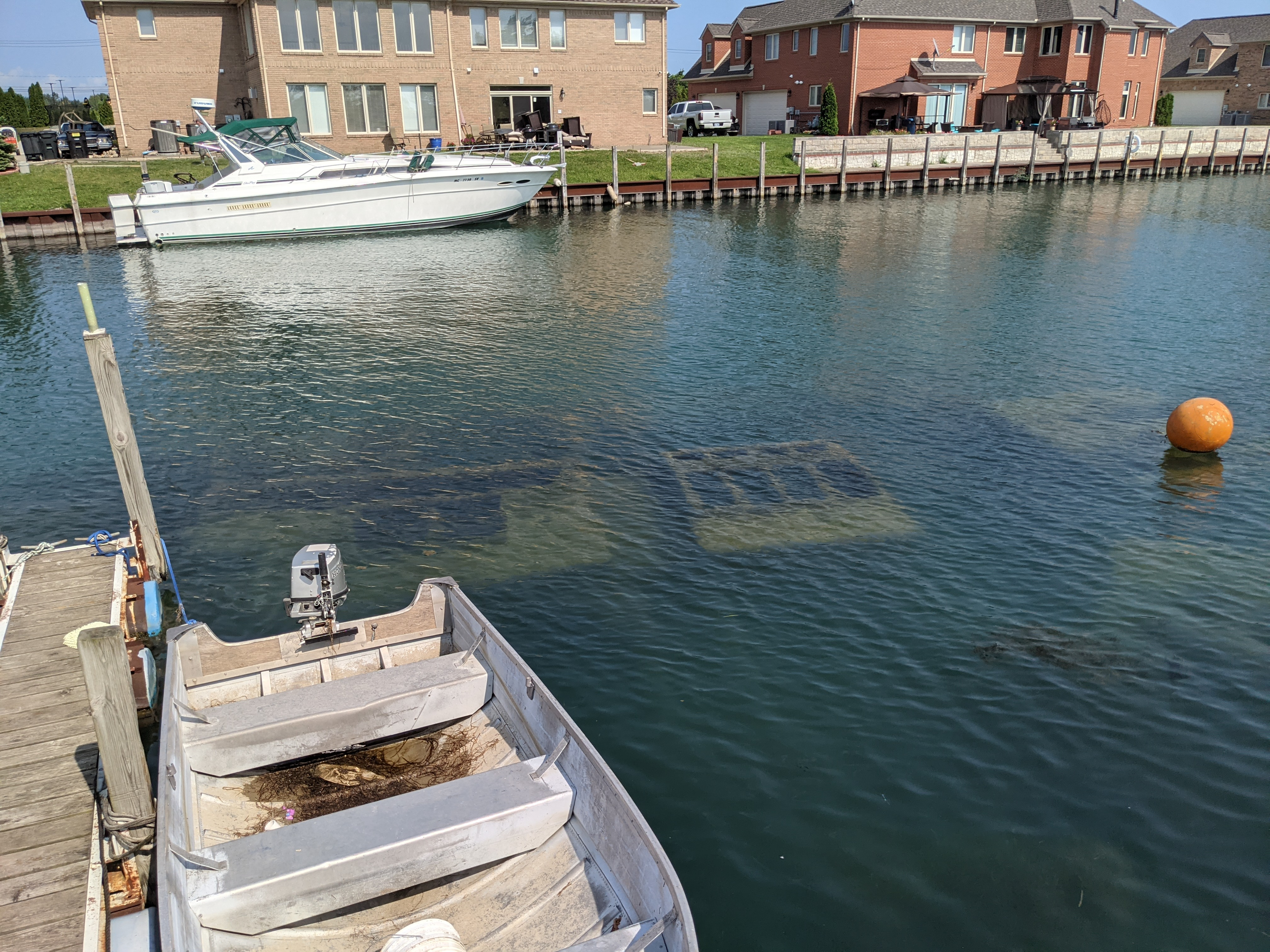
The sunken Blue Dolphin at Detroit, August 2021

While still in Maine, Blue Dolphin changed hands again. A printer from Detroit, Michigan, named Joe Pica purchased her. Pica had already restored one vessel - Katherine II - and was looking for a larger ship. He sailed Blue Dolphin into the Great Lakes where she was berthed at Sarnia, Ontario, for a number of years. That was the last time Blue Dolphin left the dock under her own power. She sank at the dock in Sarnia at least twice during the restoration efforts. The first time, Pica said the fresh water permeated her oakum caulking and when freeze up came it turned to ice. With ice-out, so went the caulking opening up a seam 1/8-inch (3.2 mm) wide by nearly 100 feet (30 m) long. With no ship keeper to stem the inflow, she sank. The second sinking Pica attributed to sabotage - unsubstantiated.

Journalist and photographer Bruce Kemp became interested in the restoration when he was assigned the story by Sailing Canada Magazine. Because of his affiliation with another magazine at the time, he wrote the final piece under the name of Howard Douglas Jr. Kemp and his wife Donna worked with Pica in trying to set up a foundation, have debts forgiven and to make the ship an ambassador for the city of Sarnia. Kemp also worked on the project as the last in a string of divers and helped raise the ship the second time. He was instrumental in getting folk singer Stan Rogers to agree to aid the project.

Rogers commemorated the schooner with his song, "Man with Blue Dolphin", part of his From Fresh Water album. The liner notes mention that Rogers wrote the song based on his contact with Bruce Kemp and Kemp's experiences trying to raise and restore Blue Dolphin. A few weeks after writing the song "Man with Blue Dolphin" Rogers died in an airplane fire near Cincinnati.

When money problems began to plague the ship again, Pica hired a tugboat to tow Blue Dolphin over the border into the United States and away from his creditors. He did this without telling any of the people trying to help him. Blue Dolphin spent her final years in Detroit near the Goat Yard Marina. On 9 October 2018, the vessel was photographed as a sunken wreck in the canal beside the Goat Yard. On 20 April 2020, the Goat Yard Marine posted pictures of retrieving the doghouse from the water. On 21 May 2026 they posted images of the removal of the rest of Blue Dolphin from the canal.
