= Home in Halifax =

Home In Halifax

Live album by Stan Rogers
- Released: 1993
- Recorded: March 12, 1982
- Genre: Folk
- Length: 64:01
- Label: Fogarty's Cove Music
- Producer: Paul Mills

Stan Rogers chronology
From Fresh Water (1984)	Home In Halifax (1993)	From Coffee House to Concert Hall (1999)

Professional ratings
Review scores
Source	Rating
Allmusic	link

Home in Halifax is a 1993 live album by Stan Rogers. It was recorded by the CBC during a concert Rogers performed at the Rebecca Cohn Auditorium in Halifax, Nova Scotia in March 1982, 11 years prior. The concert was put together as a live radio and T.V. broadcast celebrating Rogers' annual appearance at the Cohn. The stage was decorated with a ship's mast, wheels, lobster traps and fishing nets. The live album also contains a never-before-released song called "Sailor's Rest".

A release the previous year, titled "In Concert" and released on CBC's "Variety Recordings" label, featured a different track listing of material from the same concert.

== Track listing ==
1. Bluenose
2. Make & Break Harbour
3. Field Behind The Plow
4. Shriner Cows (dialogue)
5. Night Guard
6. Morris Dancers (dialogue)
7. The Idiot
8. Lies
9. Free In The Harbour
10. Band Introductions (dialogue)
11. Workin' Joe
12. The Legend Of Fingal (dialogue)
13. Giant
14. 45 Years
15. Mary Ellen Carter Intro (dialogue)
16. The Mary Ellen Carter
17. Barrett's Privateers
18. Sailor's Rest Intro (dialogue)
19. Sailor's Rest

== In Concert Release (1991) ==
1. The Witch Of The Westmorland 4:41
2. The Field Behind The Plough 4:23
3. Night Guard 3:08
4. Forty-Five Years 3:34
5. The Idiot 2:49
6. Lies 5:37
7. Working Joe 3:40
8. Free In The Harbour 3:55
9. Dark-Eyed Molly 3:55
10. Sailors' Rest 5:35
11. The Mary Ellen Carter 5:14

== Musicians ==
1. Stan Rogers (6-string, 12-string guitars)
2. Garnet Rogers (Fiddle, Electric guitar)
3. Jim Morison (Bass)
4. Paul Mills (6-string guitar)
