= SS Marine Electric =

Bulk carrier built 1944, sank 1983

Coordinates: 37°52′54″N 74°46′35″W

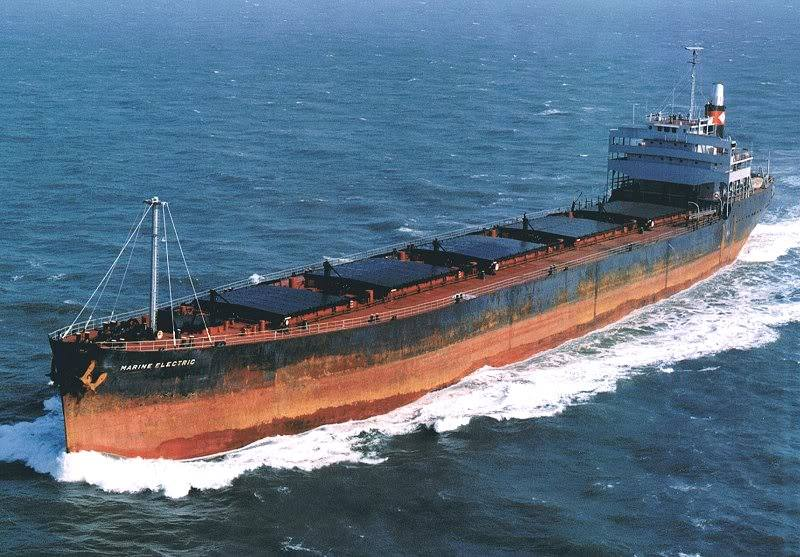
- Marine Electric

History

United States
- Name: Musgrove Mills (1944–47); Gulfmills (1947–1961); Marine Electric (1961–83)
- Owner: U.S. Maritime Commission (1944–47); Gulf Oil Corp. (1947–61); Marine Transport Lines Corp. (1961–83)
- Port of registry: Wilmington, Delaware
- Builder: Sun Shipbuilding & Drydock Co., Chester, Pennsylvania
- Yard number: 437
- Laid down: 10 January 1944
- Launched: 2 May 1944
- Completed: 23 May 1944
- Identification: IMO number: 5224833; Official number: 245675
- Fate: Foundered, 12 February 1983

General characteristics
- Class & type: Modified Type T2-SE-A1 tanker
- Tonnage: As built: 10,448 GRT; 16,613 DWT; After 1962: 13,757 GRT; 25,575 DWT
- Length: As built: 523 ft (159 m); After 1962: 605 ft (184 m)
- Beam: As built: 68 ft (21 m); After 1962: 75 ft (23 m)
- Propulsion: Turbo-electric, 6,000 shp (4,474 kW)
- Speed: 15 knots (28 km/h; 17 mph)
- Range: 12,600 nmi (23,300 km; 14,500 mi)

SS Marine Electric was a 605-foot bulk carrier that sank on 12 February 1983, about 30 miles off the coast of Chincoteague Island, Virginia, in 130 feet of water. Thirty-one of the thirty-four crew members lost their lives due to hypothermia; the three survivors endured 90 minutes drifting in the frigid waters of the Atlantic. The wreck resulted in some of the most important maritime reforms in the second half of the 20th century. The tragedy tightened inspection standards, resulted in mandatory survival suits for winter North Atlantic runs, and helped create the now famous Coast Guard rescue swimmer program.

== Ship history ==
The ship was built by the Sun Shipbuilding and Drydock Company of Chester, Pennsylvania, for the U.S. Maritime Commission (contract No. 1770) as a Type T2-SE-A1 tanker, hull number 437. She was laid down on 10 January 1944, launched on 2 May, and delivered on 23 May.

In May 1947, she was sold to the Gulf Oil Corporation and renamed Gulfmills. In May 1961, she was purchased by Marine Transport Lines (MTL), and renamed Marine Electric. The ship was modified by the addition of a new midsection for bulk cargo transport, built at the Bremer Vulkan yard in Bremen, Germany, which was then towed to the Bethlehem Steel Co. yard in East Boston. This extended the ship's length overall from 523 feet (159 m) to 605 feet (184 m), and her tonnage from 10,448 to 13,757 gross register tons (GRT). The work was completed in November 1962. However, the Marine Electric was showing its age, exhibiting corrosion and damage to the hull and other structural components.

== Final voyage ==
The Marine Electric put to sea for her final voyage on 10 February 1983, sailing from Norfolk, Virginia, to Somerset, Massachusetts, with a cargo of 24,800 tons of granulated coal. The ship sailed through a fierce (and ultimately record-breaking) storm that was gathering.

The Marine Electric neared the mouth of the Chesapeake Bay at about 2:00 a.m. on Thursday, 10 February. She battled 25-foot (7.6-m) waves and winds gusting to more than 55 miles per hour (89 km/h), fighting the storm to reach port with her cargo.

The following day, she was contacted by the United States Coast Guard to turn back to assist a fishing vessel, the Theodora, that was taking on water. The Theodora eventually recovered and proceeded on its westerly course back to Virginia; the Marine Electric turned north to resume its original route.

In the early morning hours of 12 February, members of the crew noted that the ship's bow was riding low in the water. Multiple mayday calls were made to the Coast Guard beginning at 2:51 a.m. In response, USCGC Point Highland was dispatched. Shortly thereafter, the Marine Electric capsized, killing 31 of the 34 man crew.

== Investigation ==
During the course of the investigation into the ship's sinking, representatives of MTL theorized that the ship ran aground during her maneuvering to help the Theodora, fatally damaging the hull. They contended that it was this grounding that caused the Marine Electric to sink five hours later. However, these theories were disproved by the evidence discovered during the Coast Guard investigation.

Investigations by the Coast Guard, led by Captain Dominic Calicchio and independent examinations of the wreck, discovered that the Marine Electric had left port in an un-seaworthy condition, with gaping holes in its deck plating and hatch covers. These had been noted at multiple points by surviving Chief Mate Bob Cusick, who testified that no effort had been made by MTL to rectify the issues. The hatch covers, in particular, posed a problem, since without them the cargo hold could fill with water in the storm and drag the ship under.

Investigators discovered that much of the paperwork supporting MTL's declarations of the Marine Electric′s seaworthiness was faked. Inspection records showed inspections of the hatch covers during periods when they had in fact been removed from the ship for maintenance; inspections were recorded during periods of time when the ship was not in port. A representative of the hatch covers' manufacturer warned MTL in 1982 that their condition posed a threat to the ship's seaworthiness, but inspectors never tested them. Yet the Marine Electric was repeatedly certified as seaworthy.

Part of the problem was that the Coast Guard delegated some of its inspection authority to the American Bureau of Shipping. The ABS is a private, non-profit agency that developed rules, standards and guidelines for ship's hulls. In the wake of the Marine Electric tragedy, questions were raised about how successfully the ABS was exercising the inspection authority delegated to it, as well as about whether the Coast Guard even had the authority to delegate that role. Also there was a conflict of interest in that the inspection fees paid to the ABS were paid by the ship owners.

== Aftermath ==
USCG Marine Casualty Report on SS Marine Electric

In the wake of the Marine Electric sinking, The Philadelphia Inquirer assigned two reporters, Tim Dwyer and Robert Frump, to look into old ship catastrophes. In the series, the writers concluded that government programs designed to strengthen the merchant marine had actually kept unsafe ships afloat. Frump later wrote a book, Until the Sea Shall Free Them, about the sinking.

In the wake of the Marine Board report and the newspaper's investigation, the Coast Guard dramatically changed its inspection and oversight procedures. The Coast Guard report noted that the ABS, in particular, "cannot be considered impartial", and described its failure to notice the critical problems with the ship as negligent. At the same time, the report noted that "the inexperience of the inspectors who went aboard the Marine Electric, and their failure to recognize the safety hazards...raises doubt about the capabilities of the Coast Guard inspectors to enforce the laws and regulations in a satisfactory manner."

While the Coast Guard commandant did not accept all of the recommendations of the Marine Board report, inspections were tightened, and 90 antiquated World War II vessels still functioning 40 years after the war were sent to scrap yards. In 2003, Coast Guard Captain Dominic Calicchio was posthumously awarded The Plimsoll Award by Professional Mariner magazine in part because of his role as a member of the Marine Board of Investigation.

Additionally, the Coast Guard required that survival suits be required on all winter North Atlantic runs. Later, as a direct result of the casualties on the Marine Electric, Congress pushed for and the Coast Guard eventually established the now famous Coast Guard Rescue Swimmer program.

=== Legacy ===
Chief Mate Bob Cusick credited his survival of the sinking to the Stan Rogers song "The Mary Ellen Carter". The song, which details the exploits of a loyal crew working to salvage the titular vessel, and more specifically the last stanzas, was repeatedly sung by Cusick to keep himself awake in the pounding Atlantic swell.

Following his ordeal, Cusick wrote a letter to Rogers, detailing his ordeal. Rogers responded by inviting Cusick to what would be one of his last concerts, announcing on the stage that upon his return to Canada he would write a new song specifically about the sinking of the Marine Electric. However, before he could do so, Rogers was killed aboard Air Canada Flight 797, leaving the song unwritten.

== See also ==
- SS El Faro, another superannuated and deteriorating ship, which sank during Hurricane Joaquin in similar circumstances

== Bibliography ==
- USCG, The SS Marine Electric tragedy official report.
