= From Coffee House to Concert Hall =

From Coffee House To Concert Hall

Live album by Stan Rogers
- Released: 1999
- Recorded: 1973–1983
- Genre: Folk
- Length: 70:38
- Label: Fogarty's Cove Music

Stan Rogers chronology
Home in Halifax (1993)	From Coffee House To Concert Hall (1999)

Professional ratings
Review scores
Source	Rating
Allmusic	3/5 stars

From Coffee House to Concert Hall is a 1999 folk music album by Canadian folk singer Stan Rogers. It is a compilation album of live performances and studio recordings unreleased before Rogers's death in 1983. The last track, "Down the Road", was recorded live at McCabe's Guitar Shop five days before he died.

== Track listing ==
No.	Title	Writer(s)	Recorded	Length
1.	"Guysborough Train"	Stan Rogers	1973	4:27
2.	"Pharisee"	Stan Rogers	1975	3:45
3.	"It All Fades Away"	Stan Rogers	1977	2:40
4.	"Love Letter"	Stan Rogers		3:27
5.	"Take it from Day to Day"	Stan Rogers	1981	3:27
6.	"Acadian Saturday Night"	Stan Rogers	1976	2:23
7.	"Billy Green"	Stan Rogers	1975	3:21
8.	"Straight and True"	Stan Rogers	1974	3:25
9.	"The Woodbridge Dog Disaster"	Royston Wood	1981	4:46
10.	"Louise's Song"	Stan Rogers	1976	3:43
11.	"Past Fifty"	Stan Rogers		3:57
12.	"Evangeline"	Robbie MacNeill		2:40
13.	"A Matter of Heart"	Stan Rogers		3:28
14.	"Famous Inside"	Stan Rogers	1976	3:07
15.	"At Last I'm Ready for Christmas"	Stan Rogers	1982	3:11
16.	"Your "Laker's" Back in Town"	Stan Rogers	1982	3:48
17.	"The Puddler's Tale"	Stan Rogers	1982	2:40
18.	"Music in Your Eyes"	Willie P. Bennett	1983	4:40
19.	"Leave Her, Johnny, Leave Her"	Traditional		2:58
20.	"Down the Road"	Mary McCaslin	1983	4:47
Total length:				70:38
