= From Fresh Water =

Studio album by Stan Rogers
- Released: 1984
- Genre: Folk
- Length: 42:04
- Label: Fogarty's Cove Music

Stan Rogers chronology
For the Family (1983)	From Fresh Water (1984)	Home In Halifax (1993)

Professional ratings
Review scores
Source	Rating
AllMusic	link

From Fresh Water (stylized as from fresh water) is a 1984 posthumous album by Stan Rogers. It was one of a series of concept albums Rogers intended to do about the regions of Canada. From Fresh Water is about the Great Lakes area of Canada, while Fogarty's Cove was an album about the Maritimes, and Northwest Passage was about the western provinces and the North. Had he not died, Rogers intended to do albums on the far north, Quebec, and Nova Scotia.

== Track listing ==
1. White Squall
2. The Nancy
3. Man With Blue Dolphin
4. Tiny Fish For Japan
5. Lock-Keeper
6. Half of a Heart
7. Macdonnell on the Heights
8. Flying
9. The Last Watch (on the Midland)
10. The House of Orange
