= The Cliffs of Baccalieu =

"The Cliffs of Baccalieu" is a Newfoundland song written by Jack Withers (1899-1964). Many fisherman from Newfoundland spent their summers fishing on the Labrador coast. This song depicts a tense incident for a ship coming home from Labrador on its way to either Carbonear or St. John's with its fishing crew. The ship is caught in a gale as it nears Baccalieu Island. The vessel in the song is obviously a schooner, and it would have been burdened by a full load of salt cod caught along the Labrador coast.

== Recordings ==
"The Cliffs of Baccalieu" has been recorded by many artists since it was written.

- Ryan's Fancy recorded it on the 1979 album A Time with Ryan's Fancy, They also included it on their TV shows around Newfoundland; a version can be found on the 2001 compilation CD Songs from the Shows.
- Stan Rogers recorded it on his 1983 album For The Family. He originally gives it the title The Rocks of Baccalieu though that is corrected on later albums. Rogers attributes the tune to "Traditional" rather than Jack Withers, but the published lyrics make it clear that it is the same tune.
- Bristol's Hope, with lead singer Anita Best, recorded it for their 1997 release Lately Come Over.
- Kim Stockwood includes the song on her 2011 album Back to the Water.

== See also ==
- List of Newfoundland songs
