= Jacob Lewis (singer) =

Canadian singer

Jacob Lewis is a Canadian pop and rock singer from Butlerville, Newfoundland and Labrador, most noted as the fifth season winner of Canada's Got Talent.

Lewis, who works in Newfoundland's oil and gas industry, is a father to twin boys who were born with health complications. He has performed music locally in Newfoundland, and released the folk album Home Sweet Home in 2019, but faced difficulty in building a sustained music career due to his family circumstances. His 2019 album included covers of the Canadian folk standards "Farewell to Nova Scotia", "The Mary Ellen Carter" and "Northwest Passage".

Lewis auditioned on Canada's Got Talent with a performance of Jon Bon Jovi's 1993 song "Bed of Roses", earning a golden buzzer from Shania Twain. In the elimination round he performed Benson Boone's "Beautiful Things", winning a second golden buzzer from the judges and advancing to the finale.

In the finale he performed "The Best", winning the season over second-place finishers The Martin Boys. When he returned home following the finale, he was greeted by a community celebration and a motorcade escort by the Bay Roberts fire and police departments.

At the end of May, he released a studio recording of "The Best" to music streaming platforms. In November 2025, his single "Promise" was released to streaming platforms.
