= Half a Heart =

Half a Heart may refer to:

- "Half a Heart", a 2002 song by H & Claire from Another You Another Me
- "Half a Heart", a 2006 song by Barenaked Ladies from Barenaked Ladies Are Me
- "Half a Heart", a 2013 song by One Direction from Midnight Memories
- "Half a Heart", a 2015 song by Seal from 7
- "Half of a Heart", a 1984 song by Stan Rogers from From Fresh Water
