= The Idiot (song) =

Song by Stan Rogers

"The Idiot" is a song written by Stan Rogers, found on his albums Northwest Passage and Home in Halifax. On Home in Halifax, Rogers introduces the song by explaining that it is about the movement of people away from the Atlantic Provinces of Canada to the province of Alberta for work. The introduction also states that the song contains the "knuckle-dragging" beat characteristic of Morris dance tunes.

== Story ==
The song's narrator recounts how he moved to Alberta six years earlier. Many factories in his home province had closed, employment was scarce, and he did not want to go on unemployment because he "take[s] nothing free." Instead, he moved west and took a job in a refinery. He finds his new city unpleasantly dirty and he misses his hometown, but he respects himself for making his own living and not having to rely on social assistance. He urges other young men from the Eastern provinces "who've been beaten to the ground" to follow his example, saying that they will probably miss their hometowns, as he does, but they will have "self-respect and a steady cheque" rather than the "government dole" that will "rot [their] souls."

== Recordings ==
=== Song ===
- Stan Rogers on Northwest Passage (1981) and Home in Halifax (1993)
- Seth Staton Watkins on his 2022 album Working Folk, with an additional verse.
- Colm R. McGuinness as a single in 2024.

=== Tune ===
The “knuckle-dragging rhythm” of the tune, so described by its author on Home in Halifax, has inspired many, primarily Cotswold, Morris teams to write dances to the tune. Some examples are:

- Merrimac Morris (New Hampshire, USA) wrote a dance to be danced to the tune of "The Idiot", in the Field Town style of Morris dance, in 1986.
- Uptown-on-Calhoun Morris of Minneapolis does a dance to the tune of "The Idiot".
- The Bassett Street Hounds morris team of Syracuse, N.Y. have written a dance called "The Drunken Idiot", performed to the same tune but with alternative words written by Jon Berger.
- Maple Morris wrote a big morris to the tune, seen performing it at the Sidmouth Folk Week in 2011.
- Corb Lund used the tune of the song for his song "I Wanna Be in the Cavalry" on the 2007 album Horse Soldier! Horse Soldier!.
