= Anesti Danelis =

Canadian musical comedian

Anesti Danelis is a Canadian musical comedian from Toronto, Ontario.

Previously associated with the sketch comedy troupe FomoSapiens, he premiered his first solo show Songs for the New World Order at the 2017 Toronto Fringe Festival. He toured the show to various other Canadian and international fringe theatre festivals in 2017 and 2018, and received a Canadian Comedy Award nomination for Best Variety Act at the 19th Canadian Comedy Awards in 2019.

He returned to the Toronto Fringe Festival in 2019 with his second solo show, Six Frets Under. Later that year, he received international press attention when a video of him quitting his job at Starbucks by singing a song to the patrons about what a bad boss the manager was, went viral.

During the COVID-19 pandemic he uploaded songs to social networking platforms such as YouTube and TikTok, many of which were also released on the comedy album Quarantine Bops.

In 2022, he returned to the Toronto Fringe Festival with This Show Will Change Your Life, a show parodying self-help books and themes that also included a song about his bisexuality in which he gets revenge on an ex-partner by dating both of their parents. In 2023, he premiered Artificially Intelligent, which blended some of his older songs with new creations including a song written by ChatGPT, at Buddies in Bad Times during the 2023 Queer Pride Festival.

He is slated to appear in the fifth season of Canada's Got Talent in 2025.
