= Northwest Passage (album) =

Studio album by Stan Rogers
- Released: 1981
- Recorded: October 1980
- Studio: Springfield Sound
- Genre: Folk
- Length: 39:38
- Label: Fogarty's Cove Music
- Producer: Paul Mills

Stan Rogers chronology
Between the Breaks ... Live! (1979)	Northwest Passage (1981)	For the Family (1983)

Professional ratings
Review scores
Source	Rating
Allmusic	Northwest Passage at AllMusic

Northwest Passage is a 1981 album by Stan Rogers. "Northwest Passage" compares the singer's own travels across the prairie provinces to the exploratory adventures of Sir John Franklin, Alexander Mackenzie, David Thompson, and Henry Kelsey. "The Idiot" is about a man from the Maritimes working in Alberta who yearns for his home. "Night Guard" deals with modern-day cattle rustling, and "The Field Behind the Plow" addresses the triumphs and tragedies of grain farming in Saskatchewan.

== Track listing ==
No.	Title	Length
1.	"Northwest Passage"	4:49
2.	"The Field Behind The Plow"	4:30
3.	"Night Guard"	3:17
4.	"Working Joe"	3:26
5.	"You Can't Stay Here"	3:08
6.	"The Idiot"	3:49
7.	"Lies"	5:42
8.	"Canol Road"	3:10
9.	"Free In The Harbour"	3:57
10.	"California"	3:50
Total length:		39:43
