= Turnaround (Stan Rogers album) =

Studio album by Stan Rogers
- Released: 1978
- Recorded: September 23–September 28, 1977; April 15–April 16, 1978
- Studio: Springfield Sound
- Genre: Folk
- Length: 40:13
- Label: Fogarty's Cove Music
- Producer: Valerie Rogers

Stan Rogers chronology
Fogarty's Cove (1977)	Turnaround (1978)	Between the Breaks ... Live! (1979)

Professional ratings
Review scores
Source	Rating
Allmusic	4/5 stars

Turnaround is a 1978 folk music album by Stan Rogers.

== Track listing ==
All songs written by Stan Rogers unless otherwise indicated.

1. "Dark Eyed Molly" (Archie Fisher)
2. "Oh No, Not I" (traditional, arr. Stan Rogers)
3. "Second Effort"
4. "Bluenose"
5. "The Jeannie C."
6. "So Blue"
7. "Front Runner"
8. "Song of the Candle"
9. "Try Like the Devil"
10. "Turnaround"
