= Canada's Got Talent season 5 =

Canada's Got Talent
- Season 5
- Promotional poster for season 5, featuring (L to R) host Ell, judges Offishall, Twain, Ryan, and Mandel
- Hosted by: Lindsay Ell
- Judges: Kardinal Offishall; Katherine Ryan; Shania Twain; Howie Mandel
- Winner: Jacob Lewis
- Runner-up: The Martin Boys
- No. of episodes: 9

Release
- Original network: Citytv
- Original release: March 18 – May 13, 2025

Season chronology
- ← Previous; Season 4

The fifth season of the Canadian talent show competition series Canada's Got Talent premiered on March 18, 2025, and concluded on May 13, 2025.

== Format ==
=== Auditions ===
The auditions took place in front of the judges and a live audience. At any time during the audition, the judges showed their disapproval of the act by pressing a buzzer, which lights a large red "X" on the stage. If all the judges pressed their buzzers, the act must end. Voting worked on a majority-of-three basis, where three positive votes from the judges were required. The Golden Buzzer is placed in the center of the stage, and each judge (or the host) can only press the Golden Buzzer once, sending an act straight to the semi-finals.

=== Eliminations ===
The elimination round and final were broadcast through two episodes. Judges could still end a performance early with four Xs. The acts competed for four judge votes (including two Golden Buzzers) that sent them straight to the finals, and the rest competed for two Canada-wide votes that dictated the rest of the finalists. All other acts were then eliminated from the competition.

=== The Finals ===
The acts who made it through the Eliminations have a final shot at performing once again, and all of the acts competed for a Canada-wide vote that determined the winner of the season. This round has been broadcast live, and the winner is revealed at the end of the episode.

== Judges and host ==
Judges for Canada's Got Talent (season 5)

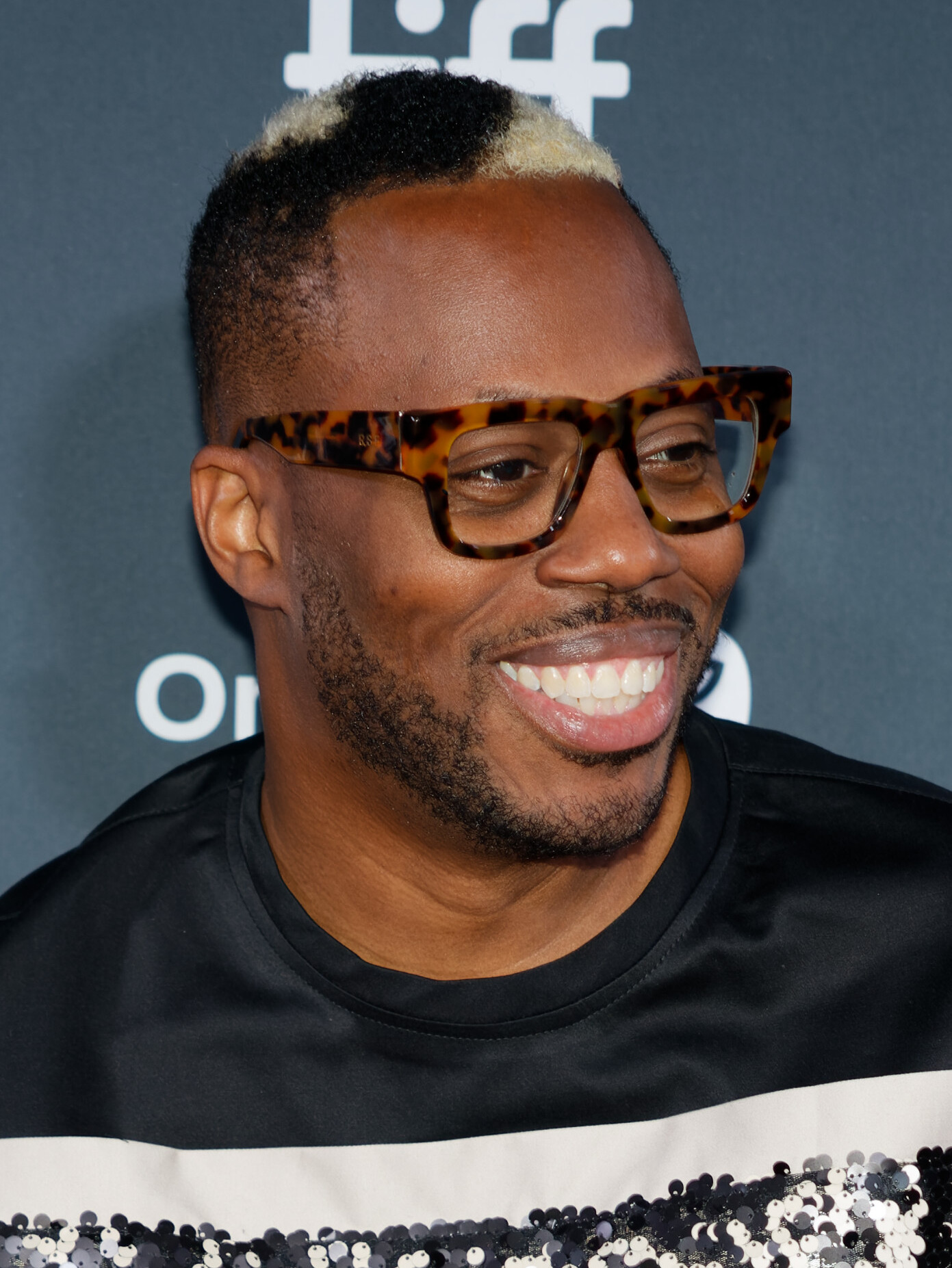
Kardinal Offishall

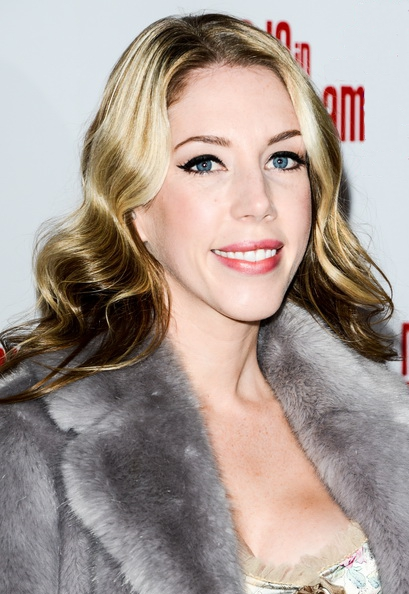
Katherine Ryan

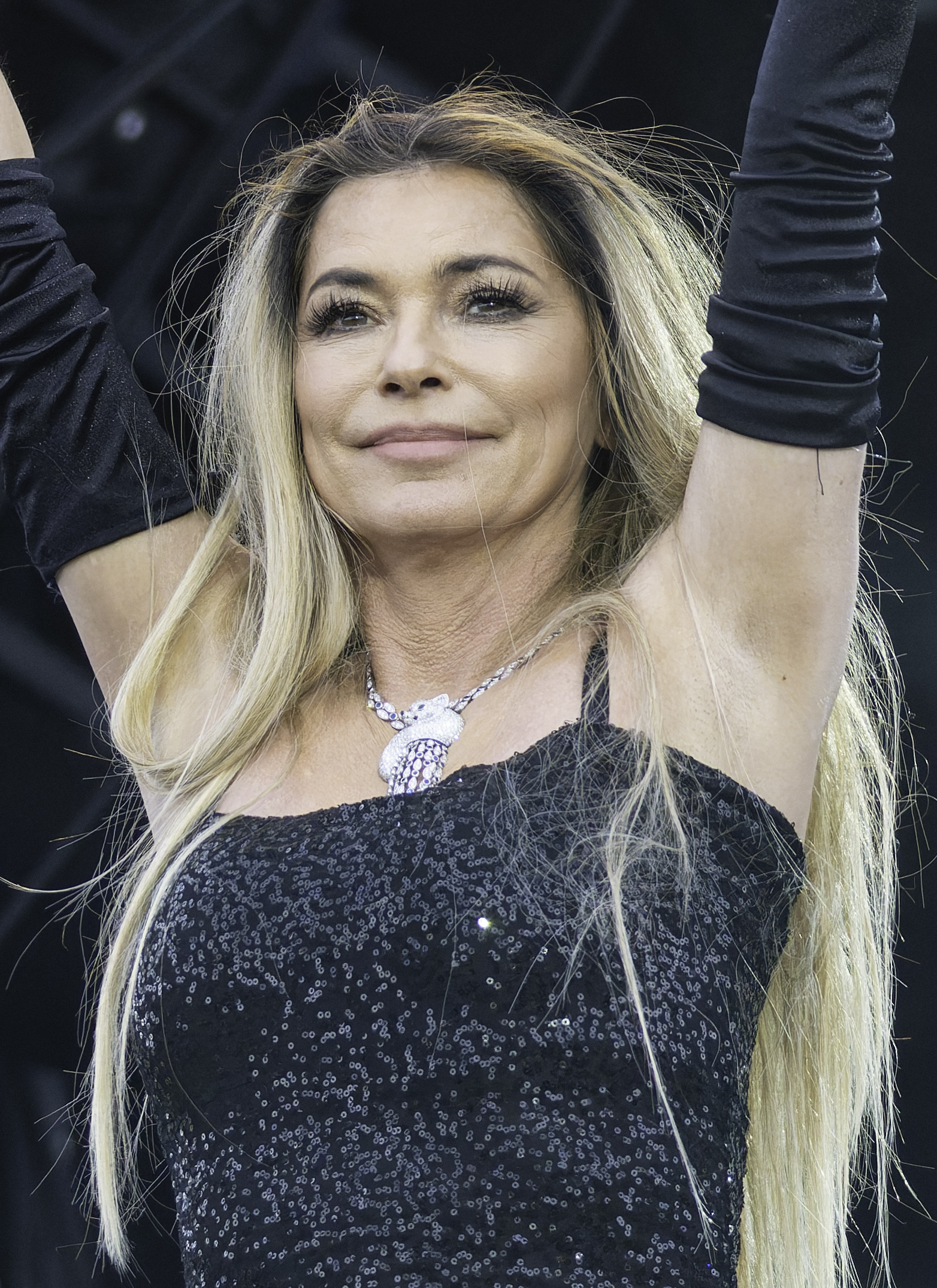
Shania Twain

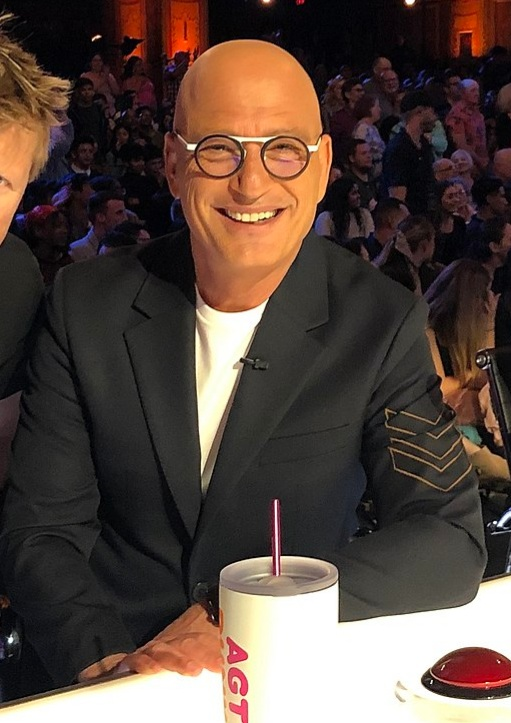
Howie Mandel

Two new judges joined the panel in the fifth season: comedian Katherine Ryan and country superstar Shania Twain, replacing Trish Stratus and Lilly Singh respectively. Howie Mandel and Kardinal Offishall returned for their fourth seasons as judges, while Lindsay Ell returned for her fourth season as host.

== Production ==
In June 2024, Citytv announced that it had renewed Canada's Got Talent for a new season to premiere in 2025. This season the grand prize is CA$1,000,000, courtesy of Citytv owner Rogers Communications. Each recipient of a Golden Buzzer during the auditions also earn a $25,000 prize from sponsor CIBC. Filming for the auditions took place at the OLG Stage at Niagara Fallsview Casino Resort on October 22–27, 2024, while filming for the eliminations took place on December 12-13, 2024.

The initial Rogers press release announcing the season's competitors included comedians Anesti Danelis, Matt Wright and Tape Face, singers Darby Mills and Yama Laurent, and Choir! Choir! Choir!.

== Season overview ==
| Participant | Genre | Act | From | Result |
|---|---|---|---|---|
| Ben Kahan | Magic | Magician | Toronto, ON | Eliminated |
| Carsim Birmingham | Singing | Singer | Vancouver, BC | Finalist |
| Chantaaaal | Singing | Drag Entertainer | France | Eliminated |
| Darren Leo | Comedy | Comedian | Toronto, ON | Finalist |
| DeeDee Austin | Singing | Singer and Pianist | Abegweit First Nation, PEI | Eliminated |
| Funkyverse | Dance | Dance Group | Toronto, ON | Third place |
| Illumin Drone Shows | Variety | Drone Display Group | Toronto, ON | Finalist |
| Jacob Lewis | Singing | Singer | Butlerville, NL | Winner |
| The Jambo Brothers | Acrobatics | Acrobatic Group | Kenya | Eliminated |
| The Martin Boys | Singing | Singing Duo | Woodstock, NB | Runner-up |
| Nicolina | Singing | Singer | Vaughan, ON | Fourth place |
| Sai Kit Lo | Comedy | Comedian | Markham, ON | Finalist |
| Tulga | Danger | Strongman | Mongolia | Eliminated |
| TwoFourSeven | Dance | Dance Group | Vancouver, BC | Eliminated |

=== The Eliminations summary ===
Buzzed Out | Advanced (Golden Buzzer) | Advanced (Won the Judge's Vote) | Advanced (Won the Public's Vote)

The Eliminations (May 6th)

The judges could not decide between four acts (Carsim Birmingham, The Jambo Brothers, Nicolina and Tulga) who should advance, so decided to put it up to a Public Vote to determine which two would become finalists. The winners were revealed to be Carsim and Nicolina.

Shania Twain was absent from The Eliminations due to being on her world tour at the time.

| Participant | Order | Buzzes and Judges' votes | | | Result |
| Participant | Order | Mandel | Ryan | Offishall | Result |
|---|---|---|---|---|---|
| The Jambo Brothers | 1 | | | | Eliminated |
| Tulga | 2 | | | | Eliminated |
| The Martin Boys | 3 | | | | Advanced |
| DeeDee Austin | 4 | | | | Eliminated |
| Darren Leo | 5 | | | | Advanced |
| Sai Kit Lo | 6 | | | | Advanced |
| Illumin Drone Shows | 7 | | | | Advanced |
| Ben Kahan | 8 | | | | Eliminated |
| Chantaaaal | 9 | | | | Eliminated |
| TwoFourSeven | 10 | | | | Eliminated |
| Funkyverse | 11 | | | | Advanced |
| Nicolina | 12 | | | | Advanced |
| Carsim Birmingham | 13 | | | | Advanced |
| Jacob Lewis | 14 | | | | Advanced |

=== Live Finale (May 13) ===
Winner | Runner-up | 3rd place | 4th place | Finalist

| Finalist | Result (May 13) |
|---|---|
| The Martin Boys | Runner-up |
| Jacob Lewis | Winner |
| Illumin Drone Shows | Finalist |
| Darren Leo | Finalist |
| Carsim Birmingham | Finalist |
| Nicolina | Fourth place |
| Sai Kit Lo | Finalist |
| Funkyverse | Third place |
