= USCGC Point Highland =

United States Coast Guard cutter

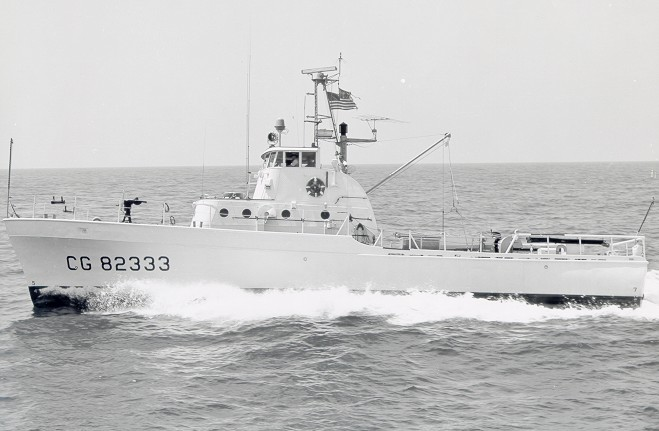
- CG-82333 (later-Point Highland), 1965, underway off Crisfield, Maryland.

History

United States
- Name: USCGC Point Highland (WPB-82333)
- Namesake: Point Highland, Everglades National Park, Florida
- Owner: United States Coast Guard
- Builder: Coast Guard Yard, Curtis Bay, Maryland
- Commissioned: 27 June 1962
- Decommissioned: 24 July 2001
- Fate: Transferred to Trinidad and Tobago, 24 July 2001

General characteristics
- Type: Patrol Boat (WPB)
- Displacement: 60 tons
- Length: 82 ft 10 in (25.25 m)
- Beam: 17 ft 7 in (5.36 m) max
- Draft: 5 ft 11 in (1.80 m)
- Propulsion: 1962 • 2 × 800 hp (597 kW) Cummins diesel engines; 1990 • 2 × 800 hp (597 kW) Caterpillar diesel engines
- Speed: 22.9 knots (42.4 km/h; 26.4 mph)
- Range: 542 nmi (1,004 km) at 18 kn (33 km/h; 21 mph); 1,500 nmi (2,800 km) at 9.4 kn (17.4 km/h; 10.8 mph)
- Complement: Domestic service : 8 men
- Armament: 1962 • 1 × Oerlikon 20 mm cannon

USCGC Point Highland (WPB-82333) was an 82-foot (25 m) Point class cutter constructed at the Coast Guard Yard at Curtis Bay, Maryland in 1962 for use as a law enforcement and search and rescue patrol boat. Since the Coast Guard policy in 1962 was not to name cutters under 100 feet (30 m) in length, it was designated as WPB-82333 when commissioned and acquired the name Point Highland in January 1964 when the Coast Guard started naming all cutters longer than 65 feet (20 m).

== Construction and design details ==
Point Highland was built to accommodate an 8-man crew. She was powered by two 800 hp (597 kW) VT800 Cummins diesel main drive engines and had two five-bladed 42 in (1.1 m) propellers. Water tank capacity was 1,550 U.S. gallons (5,900 L) and fuel tank capacity was 1,840 U.S. gallons (7,000 L) at 95% full. After 1990 she was refit with 800 hp (597 kW) Caterpillar diesel main drive engines. Engine exhaust was ported through the transom rather than through a conventional stack and this permitted a 360-degree view from the bridge; a feature that was very useful in search and rescue work as well as a combat environment.

The design specifications for Point Highland included a steel hull for durability and an aluminum superstructure and longitudinally framed construction was used to save weight. Ease of operation with a small crew size was possible because of the non-manned main drive engine spaces. Controls and alarms located on the bridge allowed one man operation of the cutter thus eliminating a live engineer watch in the engine room. Because of design, four men could operate the cutter; however, the need for resting watchstanders brought the crew size to eight men for normal domestic service. The screws were designed for ease of replacement and could be changed without removing the cutter from the water. A clutch-in idle speed of three knots helped to conserve fuel on lengthy patrols and an eighteen knot maximum speed could get the cutter on scene quickly. Air-conditioned interior spaces were a part of the original design for the Point class cutter. Interior access to the deckhouse was through a watertight door on the starboard side aft of the deckhouse. The deckhouse contained the cabin for the officer-in-charge and the executive petty officer. The deckhouse also included a small arms locker, scuttlebutt, a small desk and head. Access to the lower deck and engine room was down a ladder. At the bottom of the ladder was the galley, mess and recreation deck. A watertight door at the front of the mess bulkhead led to the main crew quarters which was ten feet long and included six bunks that could be stowed, three bunks on each side. Forward of the bunks was the crew's head complete with a compact sink, shower and commode.

== History ==
Point Highland was stationed at Little Creek, Virginia, from the time of her commissioning in 1962 to 1965. She was used for law enforcement and search and rescue operations. On 16 June 1965, she stood by the Norwegian freighter Blue Master and USS Hartley (DE-1029) following a collision off Cape Henry.

She transferred to Crisfield, Maryland in 1965 to replace the USCGC Point Grace (WPB-82323) which had been assigned to duty in Vietnam. On 22 February 1967, Point Highland assisted following a collision between motor vessels Bodoro and Beaver State on the Potomac River. On 22 February 1967, she towed the disabled tug Hay-de and a barge following a collision with motor vessel Hellenic Halcyon 10 miles north of Smith Point. On 21 January 1970, she located and towed a barge containing 1,200 tons of sulfuric acid four miles northwest of Tangier Island until she was relieved by a commercial tug, an operation for which she was awarded her first Coast Guard Unit Commendation. On 23 March 1970, she recovered a Navy LCM that had been abandoned in the Chesapeake Bay. She was ordered to Key West, Florida, for temporary duty during the Mariel Boatlift, in the summer of 1980. While assigned to this operation she assisted seven refugee boats and was awarded the Humanitarian Service Medal.

Point Highland transferred to Chincoteague, Virginia, in April 1981. She made her first drug bust later that year on 2–4 October when she seized a 61 ft (19 m) pleasure yacht on the Chesapeake Bay that was smuggling 10 tons of marijuana. During a winter storm in February, 1983, the cutter was called out to assist the disabled fishing vessel Theodora. At the same time, 30 miles east of Chincoteague, the 605-foot coal freighter SS Marine Electric reported that she was taking on water. After escorting the Theodora to Chincoteague Inlet, Point Highland raced to answer the Marine Electric's distress call. Battling 30-foot seas, 40 knot winds, and below-freezing temperatures, she arrived on scene and began what proved to be a futile search for survivors. Point Highland then recovered 17 bodies. She was awarded her second Unit Commendation for these actions.

On 26 December 1985 Point Highland again distinguished herself in a marathon rescue case by saving four persons from the distressed sailing vessel Canisvliet 336 miles off of Oregon Inlet, North Carolina. She battled 25-foot seas and 50 knot winds to effect the rescue which took 77 hours to complete, and at that time this was the longest offshore rescue by a WPB in Fifth Coast Guard District history. For her actions with this rescue she was awarded the Coast Guard Meritorious Unit Commendation.

On 17 July 1987, she towed the disabled fishing vessel Betty J safely to Chincoteague. She participated in the military exercises Solid Shield '89 and Ocean Venture '90. During this same time she escorted the carrier USS John F. Kennedy (CV-67) into Norfolk, escorted three Soviet warships during their port call to Norfolk, and conducted maritime law enforcement operations with the Virginia Air National Guard.

From 1997 to 2001, Point Highland was stationed at Cape May, New Jersey but during Operation Desert Storm she was assigned to patrol a security zone at the Sunny Point Military Ocean Terminal, in Southport, North Carolina. She spent three weeks in March, 1991 on the Cape Fear River protecting this vital depot. She was awarded her third Unit Commendation and a second Special Operations Service Ribbon for this operation. She then earned two Meritorious Unit Commendations and a Special Operations Service Ribbon for "aggressive and productive maritime law enforcement operations." From August 1991 to August 1992 Point Highland initiated 35 Federal fisheries cases, six zero tolerance drug cases, one illegal immigrant case, one boating while intoxicated cases and apprehended five fugitives from justice.

Point Highland was decommissioned on 24 July 2001 and transferred to the Republic of Trinidad and Tobago at a dockside ceremony in Cape May. She was renamed the Bacolet Point.
