= Artisan (group) =

English vocal harmony group

- Origin: England
- Genre: Folk
- Years active: 1984–2005, 2010, 2015-16, 2019, 2021-22, 2024-5
- Members: Brian Bedford; Jacey Bedford; Hilary Spencer
- Website: www.artisan-harmony.com

Artisan is an English a cappella vocal harmony trio from Yorkshire, England, consisting of songwriter Brian Bedford, his wife Jacey Bedford, and Hilary Spencer. They were initially active from 1985 to 2005, and have reunited occasionally since.

== History ==
=== Formation (1984-89) ===
Artisan formed in 1984 when Jacey and Brian Bedford invited Hilary Spencer to sing with them at a concert at Birdsedge Village Hall near Huddersfield, West Yorkshire, England. Prior to this Spencer had been trained for opera, singing coloratura soprano as an amateur singer with local operatic societies in Sheffield. Brian Bedford had attended Huddersfield School of Music (1970–72) and Bretton Hall College of Education (1972–73) and after learning 'cello as a first instrument had entered the teaching profession, teaching primary children at Crofton Shay Lane Junior and Infants – later Crofton Shay Lane Infants (Wakefield MDC education authority) during which time he had responsibility for music throughout the school. Jacey Bedford had no formal musical training beyond school choirs (Barnsley Girls' High School 1962–1969).

Artisan's early repertoire was a mixture of traditional and contemporary songs, all performed a cappella (i.e., without instruments) and in three-part close harmony, broadly within the folk genre, though with a cappella versions of some pop standards included. Their trademark sound was developed with Spencer singing strong lead in a much lower range than her original coloratura, with Jacey's softer voice providing a lighter (usually higher) harmony and Brian's voice often being used at the top end of his bass-baritone range so that Hilary and Brian's voices were fairly close together in range, 'glued' together by Jacey's.

=== Full-time touring (1989–2005) ===
After five years of performing at UK folk clubs part-time, Artisan went full-time in July 1989 when trio members gave up their day jobs. After that their first European work followed (Belgium, Okapi Folk Festival, Lokeren, and Bokregdag, 1990). In 1994, came their first transatlantic tour to Canada playing the Owen Sound Summerfolk Festival and the Mariposa Folk Festival, followed by a return to Canada and a first tour to the US in 1995 playing Bethlehem Musikfest in Pennsylvania.

In the next ten years there were thirty tours to the US and Canada playing venues and major festivals including: Vancouver Folk Music Festival; Winnipeg Folk Festival and the Philadelphia Folk Festival. In 2003 they played the Millennium Stage at Washington, D.C.'s Kennedy Center. The complete unedited performance is archived on the Kennedy Center site.

There was also one tour to Australia in 2000 to play the Port Fairy Folk Festival.

They built a strong fan base, both in the UK and North America. Artisan performed a few traditional folk songs, and songs written by other songwriters; however the majority of their work was penned by Brian Bedford (not to be confused with the actor Brian Bedford). One of their most popular songs is, "What's the Use of Wings", written by Brian, about the need to "let go" of loved ones, and give them the freedom to make their own decisions. It has been covered by artists and groups including the late Vin Garbutt the late John Wright, Marie Little, Gilly Darbey and the Philadelphia Gay Men's Choir.

Artisan concerts were always lively, known for their audience participation, particularly their Christmas concerts ("Stuff the Turkey"), which had a pantomime feel to them.

=== End of regular touring and reunions (2005–present) ===
The group stopped touring in 2005, with two final concerts held on 20 November 2005, recorded and available on DVD.

In 2010, Artisan came together again for a short, limited date reunion tour to venues and festivals in the UK and Canada. They did a further reunion tour in 2015, but only to venues and festivals in the UK. In 2016 they played a couple of festivals. Then in 2019 they played a fundraising concert for Motor Neurone Disease at a local venue, The Pie Hall in Denby Dale, West Yorkshire. They agreed to do a repeat performance in the Autumn of 2020, which was cancelled on account of the Covid lockdown. Further MND fundraisers were held in 2021 and 2022.

Hilary Spencer was half of QuickSilver with Grant Baynham from 2002 until Baynham's death in 2022, and also sang with Les Barker's Mrs Ackroyd Band, continuing to perform with other members of the band as MrsAckroyd after Barker's death. Brian runs the recording studio, Park Head Studio. Jacey runs Jacey Bedford Tour Management, an agency that arranges tours for folk musicians, mainly from overseas. Jacey also writes science fiction and fantasy. She is published in the US by DAW books (part of the PenguinRandomHouse group of publishers.

The trio reunited for a single concert in the Huddersfield area in 2024, and again in 2025.

== Band members ==
- Brian Bedford (born 7 August 1949, Barnsley, West Yorkshire, England)
- Jacey Bedford (born 26 September 1950, Barnsley)
- Hilary Spencer (born 22 January 1949, Mexborough, West Yorkshire, England)

== Discography ==
- Three Piece Sweet (1986)
- Searching for Yorladale (1988)
- Driving Home (1989)
- The Season of Holly and Ivy (1990)
- Rocking at the End of Time (1991)
- Breathing Space (1993)
- Bygone Christmas (1994)
- Our Back Yard (1996)
- Paper Angels (1999)
- Dancing With Words (2000)
- Christmas Is Come In (2002)
- Silver And Gold (2003)
- Artisan Live (2005)
- Random Play (2010)
- (DVD) Artisan at the Paramount (2006) (This is a recording of Artisan's last concert on 20 November 2005)

== Awards ==
- In 1997 they were nominated for the "Best Folk Song" award by the Contemporary A Cappella Society at the Contemporary A cappella Recording Awards (CARAs) for the song "Lest We Forget", from the Our Back Yard album.
- In 1998 they won the "Best Folk Song" award, at the CARAs, for the song "Mabel" from the Driving Home album. In 1999 they were nominated for the "Best Holiday Album" award at the CARAs, for Paper Angels. In 2001 they won "Best Folk/World Album" award at the CARAs, for Dancing With Words.

== Sources ==
- Music Hound Folk – The Essential Album Guide ed Neal Walters & Brian Mansfield. Published 1998 Visible Ink Press, ISBN 1-57859-037-X
