= Make and Break Harbour =

Song by Stan Rogers

from the album Fogarty's Cove
- Language: English
- Released: 1976
- Genre: Folk
- Length: 4:27
- Label: Barn Swallow Records
- Songwriter: Stan Rogers

"Make and Break Harbour" is a song by the Canadian folk singer Stan Rogers, first recorded as the 11th track on the album Fogarty's Cove in 1976. Standing with a significant portion of Rogers' work, the song features two common themes found within his other work: life on the sea and the endangered traditions that life encompasses.

== Themes ==
"Make and Break Harbour" is about the dying of fishing traditions and the importance of the four-stroke one-piston inboard engines (known as the Make and Break engine or the "one-lunger") that Atlantic Canadian fishing communities used. The one-piston style engine was an important piece of technology featured on inboard motors for small fishing vessels that dot the Atlantic Canadian coastline. These engines served an important role in the history of the Atlantic fisheries. Throughout the song Rogers talks of the dying traditions associated within those small communities. Rogers cites some of the reasons for the loss of tradition with lines such as "And the young folk don't stay with the fisherman's way/Long ago they all moved to the cities" and "Now I can see the big draggers that stirred up the bay/Leaving lobster traps smashed on the bottom/And they think it don't pay to respect the old ways/That make and break men have not forgotten".

"Make and Break Harbour" also has a commentary on the overfishing that happened with the introduction of fishing trawlers in Atlantic Canada. These trawlers would not only destroy lobster traps as the lyrics above show, but would also overfish, and outfish the fisherman who remained with the one-piston engine. The inshore fish stocks started to decline with the introduction of domestic and foreign trawlers. From 1958 through 'til 1974 the cod industry was in severe decline. Coinciding with the overfishing and decline of cod was the decline in cod fishermen and the yearly catch per fisherman.
