= Nigel Russell =

Canadian singer-songwriter (1948–2009)

Nigel Russell (1948 – August 14, 2009) was a Canadian singer/songwriter who played guitar and fiddle. He is known for writing the song "White Collar Holler", and as part of the Austin, Texas band The Studebakers.

== Early life ==
Russell was born in Scotland, and grew up in Ontario, Canada.

Russell attended Trent University in Peterborough, where he joined the Trent Folk Club and performed in a trio, The Hobbits, with Stan Rogers and Terri Olenick.

== Career ==
Russell performed as lead guitarist for folksinger Stan Rogers until 1973, when he was replaced by Rogers' brother Garnet. He wrote a song "The White Collar Holler", which was performed regularly by Rogers for many years. Rogers later recorded the song on his album Between the Breaks ... Live!. The song also appears on the album Waterside, by the band Dramtreeo, and on a compilation album, AK79.

Russell performed for several years in Ontario folk music venues. In the early 1980s he moved to Austin, Texas, where he performed with The Studebakers, a band which featured three part female vocal harmony. The band released two albums, Christmas With the Studebakers and Now and Then through the Orchard label in 2004, and later So In Love With the Studebakers .

Russell died in Austin on August 14, 2009.
