= Northwest Passage (song) =

Song by Stan Rogers

from the album Northwest Passage
- Released: 1981
- Recorded: 1981
- Genre: Folk, Contemporary folk, Sea shanty
- Length: 4:45
- Label: Fogarty's Cove Music
- Songwriter: Stan Rogers

"Northwest Passage" is one of the best-known songs by Canadian musician Stan Rogers. The original recording from the 1981 album of the same name is an a cappella song, featuring Rogers alone singing the verses, with his younger brother Garnet Rogers, David Alan Eadie and Chris Crilly harmonizing with him in the chorus.

== Background ==
While it recalls the history of early explorers who were trying to discover a route across Canada to the Pacific Ocean (especially Sir John Franklin, who lost his life in the quest for the Northwest Passage), the song’s central theme is a comparison between the journeys of these past explorers and the singer's own journey across Canada. The singer ultimately reflects that, just as the quest for a northwest passage might be considered a fruitless one (in that a viable and navigable northwest passage was never found in the days of Franklin and his kind), a modern-day journeyer along similar paths might meet the same end. The song also references the geography of Canada, including the Fraser River ("to race the roaring Fraser to the sea") on the western coast, the Beaufort Sea to the north and the Davis Strait to the east. He is driving across the Prairies, allowing him to view cities behind him fall and cities ahead rise.

== Lyrics ==
The narrator states that he is taking "passage overland in the footsteps of brave Kelso" three centuries after. This refers to Henry Kelsey, an English explorer and trader apprenticed to the Hudson's Bay Company in 1684, who was commissioned to explore the prairies in response to the competition posed by French Traders. Rogers confessed in an interview in 1982 that during the writing of the song, he had not been sure of Kelsey's name, and had guessed it was Kelso when recording the song. The lines "To find the hand of Franklin reaching for the Beaufort Sea" and "seeking gold and glory, leaving weathered broken bones/and a long-forgotten lonely cairn of stones" commemorate the Franklin expedition.

== Legacy ==
The song appears on an album of the same name released by Rogers in 1981, and is considered one of the classic songs in Canadian music history.

When Peter Gzowski of CBC's national radio program Morningside asked Canadians to pick an alternative national anthem, "Northwest Passage" was the overwhelming choice of his listeners. In the 2005 CBC Radio One series 50 Tracks: The Canadian Version, "Northwest Passage" ranked fourth, behind only Neil Young's "Heart of Gold", Barenaked Ladies' "If I Had $1,000,000" and Ian and Sylvia's "Four Strong Winds". It has been referred to as one of Canada's unofficial anthems by former Prime Minister Stephen Harper, and former Governor General Adrienne Clarkson quoted the song both in her first official address and in her speech at the dedication of the new Canadian embassy in Berlin.

== Releases and covers ==
The song also appeared in the final episode of the television series, Due South, and has been covered in acoustic form by the British duo Show of Hands on their album Cold Frontier. Show of Hands do not perform the song a capella but use guitar and violin to provide musical backing. It also appeared on the episode "Buried in Ice" of the PBS series NOVA about the discovery of gravesites belonging to members of the Franklin Expedition. The exhumation and study of the bodies revealed that the crew of the Franklin Expedition suffered from lead poisoning, possibly contributing to the catastrophic failure of the men to survive, although a more recent study suggested zinc deficiency as a more likely cause of their deaths.

The song was used on October 9, 2007 by the BBC World Service's World Today programme during a story about the expansion of Canada's efforts to confirm its sovereignty over the Arctic region through which the Northwest Passage runs.

Artist Matt James used the lyrics to accompany his illustrations for a children’s book that received a 2013 Governor General’s Literary award.

The Canadian power metal band Unleash the Archers made a cover of the song, it was released on the EP Explorers.

American a cappella group Home Free made a cover of the song, featuring Seán Dagher. it was released on their sea shanty album Challenge the Sea. They frequently use the song as an encore to close their concerts in their Highways and High Seas 2026 tour.

== See also ==
- Canadian patriotic music
