= Summerfolk Music and Crafts Festival =

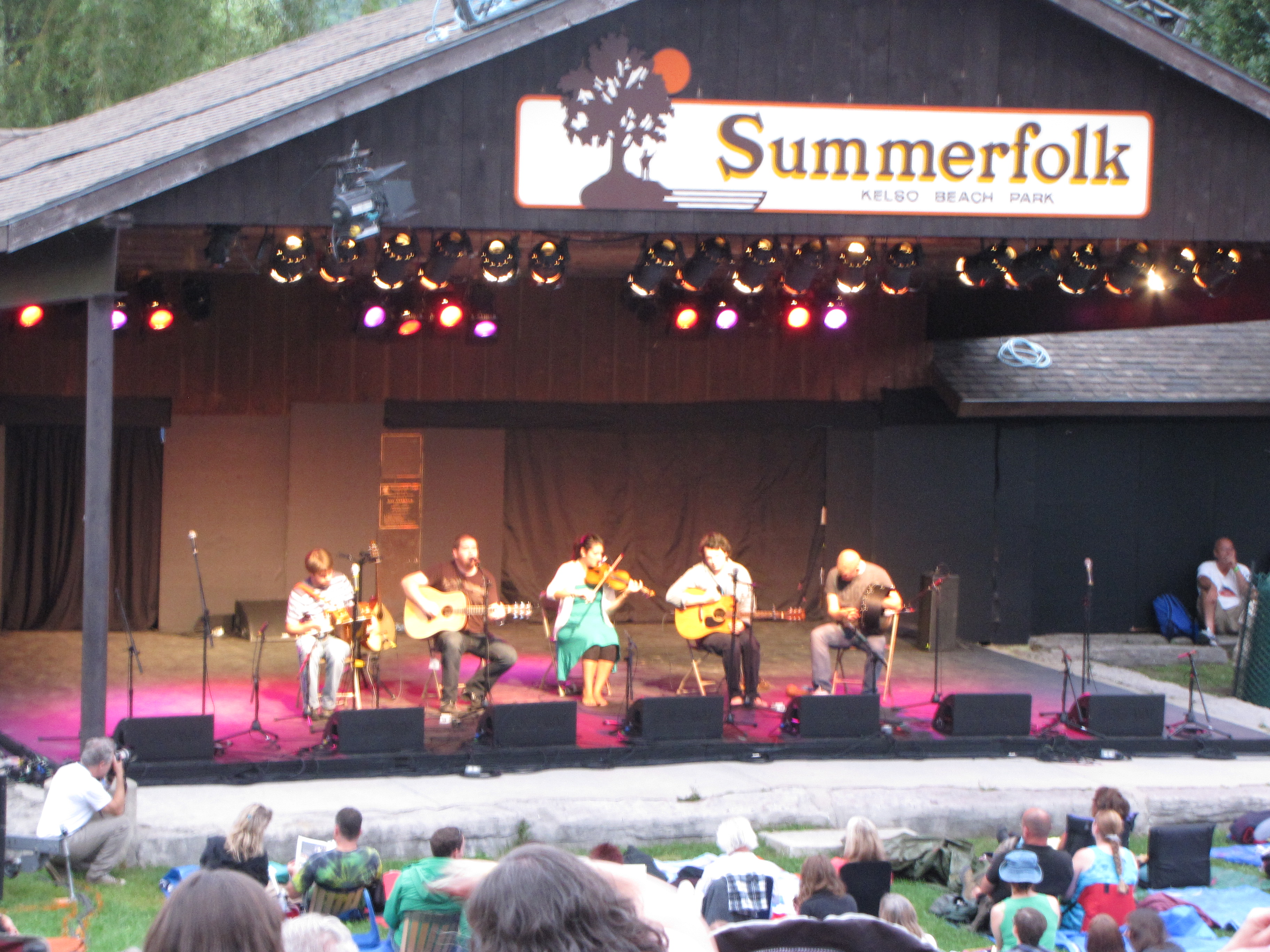
- Folk band The Dardanelles performing on the main stage in 2010
- Genre: Music festival, Arts festival
- Dates: Third Weekend in August
- Locations: Owen Sound, Ontario, Canada
- Years active: 1976 to present
- Website: Official website

Summerfolk Music and Crafts Festival, also known as Summerfolk, is a Canadian folk music festival founded in 1976. It is held annually at Kelso Beach Park in Owen Sound, Ontario on the third weekend of August, drawing thousands of attendees each year.

Many notable artists have performed at Summerfolk, such as serena Ryder, Leahy, Valdy, The Rankins, The Arrogant Worms, and Natalie MacMaster. More commercial Canadian musicians have also appeared over the years, including Gowan, Rik Emmett, Blue Rodeo, Moxy Früvous, Stan Rogers, and Bruce Cockburn.

== History ==
The festival was founded in 1976 by brothers Tim and John Harrison. The festival began with audiences sitting on garbage bags in a muddy field, but over time grew to a four-day event with seven musical stages and an area for artisans to sell their products. The festival was also a founding member of the Ontario Council of Folk Festivals, known as Folk Music Ontario.

Summerfolk has featured folk musicians from across Canada and around the world. The festival is known for its blending of contemporary artists with traditional folk musicians. The festival hosts thousands of attendees yearly, and hundreds of volunteers who provide services throughout the weekend. The partnership between the City of Owen Sound and the Georgian Bay Folk Society led to the creation of a limestone amphitheatre in the memory of Stan Rogers, one of Summerfolk's original performers. Rogers' family remains a large contributor to the festival.

Summerfolk experienced heavy rain during the festival for 20 of its first 30 years, leading long-time festival-goers to refer to the event as "Summersoak". Several times, lightning and thunderstorms forced sound crews to shut down the sound system. In these case, performers would often invite the crowd to onto the stage for intimate acoustic performances and sing-alongs. During one workshop in 2011, Ken Whitely, Kildear, and The Good Lovelies invited the audience to join them under the gazebo while rain fell, ending with the crowd singing “This Little Light of Mine” together. Ultimately, the poor weather of 2011 led to attendance plummeting and the Folk Society ending up $25,000 in debt. However, an appeal to the community and the festival's supporters allowed the situation to be remedied before the year ended, and Summerfolk 2012 ran as usual.

Since 2007, Summerfolk has reserved performance spaces for young performers selected through the Young Discoveries Showcase. The contest is open to performers under the age of 21 and features two rounds of judged performances, with winners being offered a chance to play at the festival.

In 2020, in-person festivities were cancelled due to the COVID-19 pandemic, and the festival took place online. The following year, the festival took place at 18 smaller venues throughout the city.
