= Mitch Podolak =

Canadian radio host (1947–2019)

- Born: 21 September 1947
- Died: 25 August 2019; Winnipeg, Manitoba, Canada
- Known for: helping to found the Winnipeg Folk Festival
- Awards: Order of Manitoba

Mitch Podolak (21 September 1947 – 25 August 2019) was a prominent figure of the Canadian folk music community. He began his career at the Bohemian Embassy Coffee House in Toronto in the early 1960s, where he rose from busboy to booking shows. In the late 1960s, Mitch Podolak began a dynamic relationship with CBC Radio as a freelance documentary maker, working into the 1970s for such shows as Five Nights, CBC Tuesday Night, Between Ourselves, and This Country In The Morning. Podolak hosted the CBC's "Simply Folk" radio program from 1987 to 1991. Mitch died in the evening of August 25, 2019 in Winnipeg, Manitoba.

With CBC as a resource base, Podolak helped found the Winnipeg Folk Festival in 1974, serving as the artistic director with Ava Kobrinsky and Colin Gorrie. It was an immediate success, and in 1978 he and Gorrie with Ernie Fladell, Gary Cristall, and Frannie Fitzgibbon founded the Vancouver Folk Music Festival with Colin Gorrie - creating the Vancouver International Children's Festival the same year - and within a few years, Podolak helped the Edmonton and Calgary Folk Festivals open their doors. The Vancouver Festival was a successful transference of the model Mitch Podolak developed in Winnipeg, and led to the pre-eminent growth of the western Canadian folk festivals. He has been a major contributor to festivals further East as well, including Canso, Nova Scotia, and Owen Sound, among others. For a time, Mitch commuted between Victoria, BC and Canso, NS, producing the Inter-Cultural Association of Greater Victoria's FolkFest on the West Coast and working with Troy Greencorn to establish the Stan Rogers Folk Festival on the East Coast.

Beyond Folk festivals, Podolak was the co-founder of the Winnipeg International Children’s Festival, and was the originator of the idea and effort that created the West End Cultural Centre, a major music venue in Winnipeg. In 1976, Podolak founded Barnswallow Records, the label that launched the career of Stan Rogers. More recently, Podolak operated as Executive Producer of Home Routes, North America’s only house concert circuit at the time.

In 2015, he was made a member of the Order of Manitoba, "for his contributions to the folk music community, and establishing and promoting music festivals and artistic venues in Manitoba and throughout North America."
