= Barrett's Privateers =

1976 song by Stan Rogers

Song by Stan Rogers

from the album Fogarty's Cove
- Released: 1976
- Recorded: September 23–24, 1976
- Genre: Sea shanty, folk song
- Length: 4:18
- Label: Barn Swallow
- Songwriter: Stan Rogers
- Producer: Paul Mills

"Barrett's Privateers" is a modern folk song in the style of a sea shanty, written and performed by Canadian musician Stan Rogers, having been inspired after a song session with the Friends of Fiddler's Green at the Northern Lights Festival Boréal in Sudbury, Ontario. The song describes a teenager's 1778 summer privateering journey from Nova Scotia to the Caribbean on a decrepit sloop, the Antelope, captained by Elcid Barrett; when it engages in a failed raid on a larger American ship, the Antelope sinks and all the crew are killed except the singer, who returns six years later "a broken man", having lost both his legs in the disaster. Barrett, the Antelope and other elements of the song are fictional, but "Barrett's Privateers" is full of authentic details of privateering during the American Revolution, which in Nova Scotia was dominated by privateer warfare.

The song was released on the album Fogarty's Cove in 1976 and has since gained popularity as a drinking song, with cover versions by many bands. It also appears on later Stan Rogers live albums Home in Halifax and Between the Breaks ... Live! The song makes use of mixed meter, regularly switching back and forth from 2/4 to 3/4 time. It is regarded as one of the Royal Canadian Navy's unofficial anthems, is the unofficial anthem of Atlantic Canada, and is also often sung at many Atlantic universities, including (west to east) University of New Brunswick, Mount Allison University, Acadia University, Dalhousie University, Saint Mary's University, University of King's College, St. Francis Xavier University, Cape Breton University, and Memorial University of Newfoundland.

== Cover versions ==
The popularity of "Barrett's Privateers" has inspired cover versions by many bands, such as the pirate metal band Alestorm on its third album, Back Through Time. This cover also features a guitar solo by Heri Joensen from Týr.

In 2012 the Kingston Trio recorded an a cappella version on Born at the Right Time and Celtic punk band the Real McKenzies covered it on Westwinds.

As part of a comedy bit on The Late Show with Stephen Colbert in 2022, the host and Jack White sang the first verse together, neither of them knowing that the other knew the song. Colbert had sung the song before with Michael Bublé.

Actor Paul Gross also sings his version of the song in the Due South two-part episode Mountie On the Bounty.

The Wellermen recorded a version of the song as a single for their 2026 album 1778 (album).
