= Winnipeg Folk Festival =

Music festival held in Manitoba, Canada

Coordinates: 50.0335°N 96.8801°W

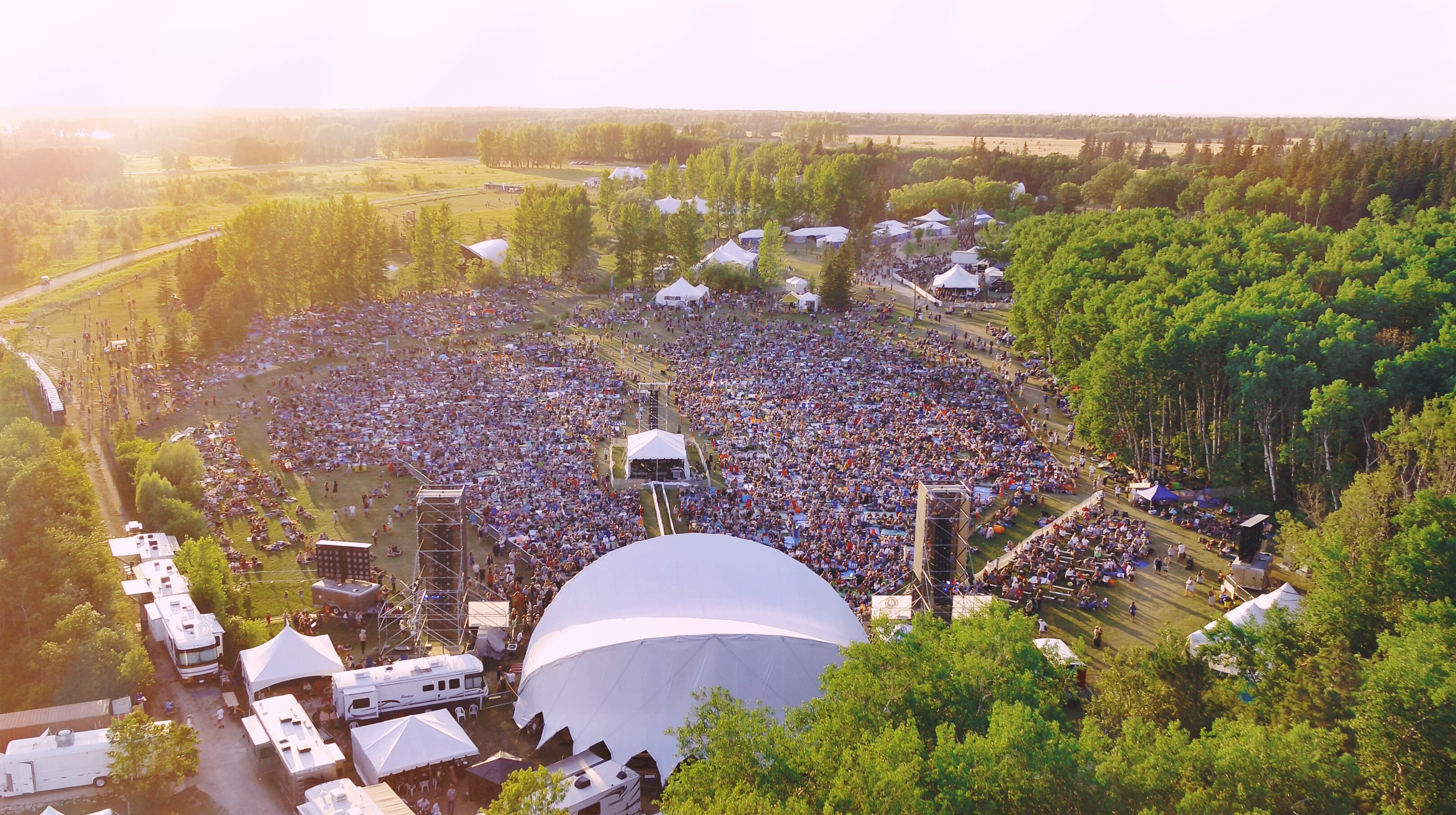
- Winnipeg Folk Festival Main Stage 2019
- Status: Active
- Genre: Music festival, arts festival
- Dates: 4 days in early July
- Frequency: Annually
- Locations: Birds Hill Provincial Park, Winnipeg, Manitoba, Canada
- Years active: 52
- Founders: Mitch Podolak, Colin Gorrie & Ava Kobrinsky
- Website: winnipegfolkfestival.ca

The Winnipeg Folk Festival is a non-profit charitable organization with an annual summer folk music festival held in Birds Hill Provincial Park, near Winnipeg, Manitoba, Canada. The festival features a variety of artists and music from around the world as well as a number of local artists.

Begun by Mitch Podolak, Colin Gorrie, and Ava Kobrinsky in 1974 as a celebration of Winnipeg's centennial, the festival itself has grown into an annual event exceeding 70,000 attendees. The festival is held over the second weekend of July, beginning on Thursday night and running through to Sunday night.

Beyond the four-day festival, the organization offers year-round concert programming at venues throughout the city bringing in artists as well as organizing free concert programming throughout the city.

== Music ==
The festival offers a wide selection of music over the four-day festival. Throughout the year the organization facilitates the Hear All Year concert series.

=== Festival programming ===
There is a large variety of music at the festival, including bluegrass, blues, Celtic, indie folk, folk rock, roots, Americana, French Canadian, contemporary singer-songwriters, and a variety of children's performers. Every year artists join the lineup from all over North America and across the world. The Winnipeg Folk Festival hosts over 70 artists annually from nearly 10 different countries including Australia, Colombia, Iceland, Ireland, Mexico, Netherlands, Niger, United Kingdom, and more with the majority of the acts coming from Canada and the United States.

The festival showcases several genres every summer. Past performers include Bahamas, Joan Baez, Barenaked Ladies, Courtney Barnett, Blue Rodeo, Oscar Brand, Brandi Carlile, Bruce Cockburn, City and Colour, Sheryl Crow, Ray Davies, Death Cab for Cutie, Elle King, Mimi Farina, Feist, Fleet Foxes, Stephane Grappelli, Great Big Sea, Arlo Guthrie, Half Moon Run, Emmylou Harris, Levon Helm, John Hiatt, Japanese Breakfast, K'naan, k.d. lang, Lyle Lovett, Nick Lowe, Natalie MacMaster, Jason Mraz, Kacey Musgraves, Odetta, Passenger, Pete Seeger, Stan Rogers, The Shins, The Strumbellas, Sudan Archives, Jeff Tweedy, Townes van Zandt, Kurt Vile, Weyes Blood, and Wilco.

Each year (except 2020) the Winnipeg Folk Festival showcases local Manitoba talent. Past local performers include Begonia, Boniface, The Bros. Landreth, John K. Samson, Leonard Sumner, Living Hour, Richard Inman, Roger Roger, Royal Canoe, William Prince and more.

== History ==
=== Winnipeg Centennial Folksong Festival, 1974 ===
The first Winnipeg folk festival was held August 9–11, 1974 at Birds Hill Provincial Park. The free concert was staged with funding from the Centennial Committee and the CBC. The event depended on the collective work of many local volunteers so the organizers developed an organizational structure that embodied their philosophy that everyone contributing was a significant participant. Subsequent events built on the foundation of this initial idea creating a model that heavily influenced the operation of other similar festivals in Canada, particularly the Vancouver Folk Music Festival and the Edmonton Folk Music Festival.

Performers at the first festival included:

- Alan Mills
- Angèle Arsenault
- Barry O'Neill
- Bill Russell
- Bob King
- Booker White
- Bram Morrison
- Bruce Cockburn
- Carol Brant
- Cathy Fink & Duck Donald
- Curly Boy Stubbs
- David Rea
- Eagle Creek Band
- Enoch Kent
- Eric and Martha Nagler
- Fraser & DeBolt
- Glen McCabe
- Humphrey & the Dumptrucks
- Jean Carignan
- Jim Donahue
- John Allan Cameron
- John P. Hammond
- Len Udow
- Leon Redbone
- Liam Clancy
- Lou Killen
- Michael Cooney
- Mike Seeger
- Mimi Fariña
- Monte Dunn & Karen Cruz
- Murray McLauchlan
- Norma-Jean McCreedy
- Original Sloth Band
- Oscar Brand
- Peter Gzowski
- Peter Mathieson
- Raffi
- Ray Materick
- Rick Neufeld
- Roosevelt Sykes
- Ryan's Fancy
- Shirley Eikhard
- Stringband
- Sylvia Tyson
- Ted MacGillivray
- Tom Jackson
- Tom Kines
- Tommy Makem

=== Honorary members ===
- Mitch Podolak (Founder/Director/Artistic Director), 1974–1975
- Colin Gorrie (Founder), 1974–1975
- Ava Kobrinsky (Founder), 1976–1989
- Nate Nurgitz (Board Legal Advisor), 1975–85
- Bill Merritt (Business/general manager), 1977–1994
- Jon Singleton (Past Treasurer), 1978–1987

=== Past Executive Directors ===
- Trudy Schroeder, 1999–2008
- Tamara Kater, 2008–2011

=== Past Artistic Directors ===
- Mitch Podolak, 1974–1986
- Rosalie Goldstein, 1987–1991
- Pierre Guérin, 1992–2000
- Rick Fenton, 2001–2004

=== Past President and Chairs ===
- Peter Stringham, 1976–1979
- Greg Brunskill, 1980
- Derek Black, 1981–1987
- Jane Graham, 1988–1990
- David Asper, 1991–1992
- Michael Handler, 1993–1995
- Brenda Prosken, 1996–1998
- Gloria Koop, 1999–2000
- Gerry Couture, 2001–2002
- Sandra Altner 2003–2004
- Terry Sargeant 2005–2009
- Allan Finkel 2010–2011
- Gerry Couture, 2012
- Mike Baudic, 2012–2015
- Karen-Denise Cyr, 2015–2017
