= Fogarty's Cove Music =

- Founded: 1978
- Founder: Stan Rogers
- Genre: Folk
- Country of origin: Canada
- Location: Dundas, Ontario
- Official website: http://stanrogers.net

Fogarty's Cove Music is a Canadian independent record label founded by Stan Rogers in 1978, surrounding the production of Rogers' second album, Turnaround. Fogarty's Cove Music is based in Dundas, Ontario, Canada.

== History ==
Stan Rogers' first album was not recorded under the Fogarty's Cove label, but under Barn Swallow Records. Barn Swallow Records was a studio purchased by Mitch Podolak. Podolak offered to record an album for Rogers after hearing him perform at Winnipeg Folk Festival in the Summer of 1975. Stan began recording Turnaround under Barn Swallow Records in 1977, but Podolak was unable to continue producing the record due to financial issues. With help from his parents, Rogers purchased Barn Swallow records from Podolak. The studio was renamed to Fogarty's Cove Music and a new logo was designed by Garnet Rogers. Despite the poor public reception of Turnaround, Rogers was able to break even on the record, and continued to record albums under Fogarty's Cove for the rest of his career.

Following Stan Rogers' death in 1983, ownership of Fogarty's Cove Music passed to his wife, Ariel. By 2011, all of Rogers' albums were licensed to Borealis Records, but Fogarty's Cove Music continues to produce the work of his son, Nathan Rogers, as well as various other Canadian folk artists.

== See also ==
- List of record labels
