= Air Canada Flight 797 =

1983 aviation accident in Kentucky

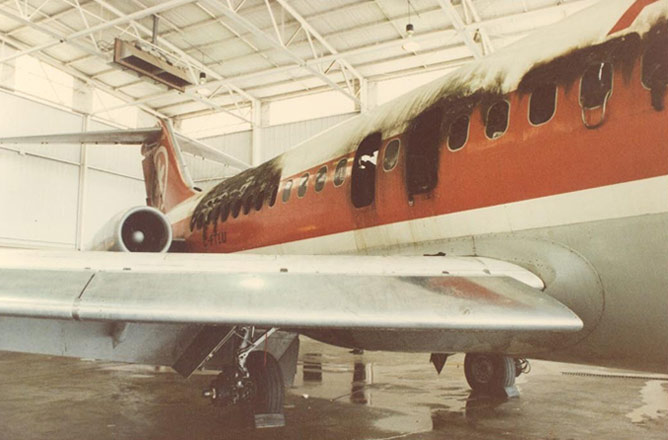
- Fire damage to the aircraft

Accident
- Date: 2 June 1983
- Summary: Emergency landing due to in-flight fire, backdraft during evacuation
- Site: Cincinnati/Northern Kentucky International Airport, Boone County, Kentucky, U.S.; 39.0489°N 84.6678°W

Aircraft
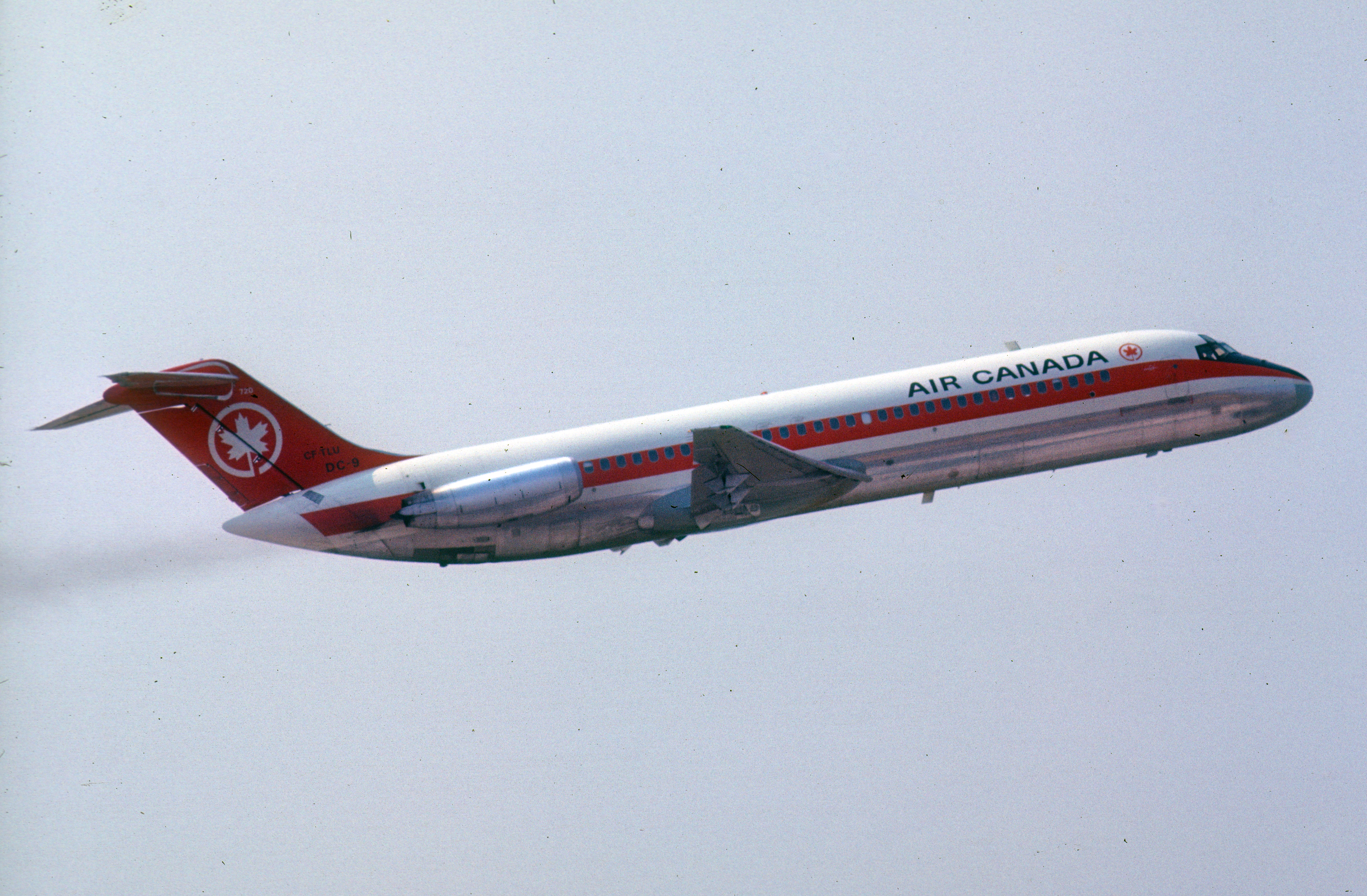
- C-FTLU, the aircraft involved in the accident, seen in 1968 with a previous livery
- Aircraft type: McDonnell Douglas DC-9-32
- Operator: Air Canada
- IATA flight No.: AC797
- ICAO flight No.: ACA797
- Call sign: AIR CANADA 797
- Registration: C-FTLU
- Flight origin: Dallas/Fort Worth International Airport, Texas, U.S.
- Stopover: Toronto International Airport, Ontario, Canada
- Destination: Montréal-Dorval International Airport, Quebec, Canada
- Occupants: 46
- Passengers: 41
- Crew: 5
- Fatalities: 23
- Injuries: 16
- Survivors: 23

External image
- Post-crash photo of the aircraft in the newer livery

Air Canada Flight 797 was an international passenger flight operating from Dallas/Fort Worth International Airport to Montréal–Dorval International Airport, with an intermediate stop at Toronto International Airport. On 2 June 1983, the McDonnell Douglas DC-9 operating the service developed an in-flight fire in air around the rear lavatory that spread between the outer skin and the inner decor panels, filling the plane with toxic smoke. The spreading fire also burned through crucial electrical cables that disabled most of the instrumentation in the cockpit, forcing the plane to divert to Cincinnati/Northern Kentucky International Airport. Ninety seconds after the plane landed and the doors were opened, the heat of the fire and fresh oxygen from the open exit doors created a backdraft, and the plane's interior immediately became engulfed in flames, killing 23 passengers—half of the people on board—who were unable to evacuate the aircraft. One of those killed in the accident was Canadian folk singer Stan Rogers, at the age of 33.

The accident became a watershed for global aviation regulations, which were changed in the aftermath of the accident to make aircraft safer. New requirements to install smoke detectors in lavatories, strip lights marking paths to exit doors, and increased firefighting training and equipment for crew became standard across the industry, while regulations regarding evacuation were also updated. Since the accident, it has become mandatory for aircraft manufacturers to prove their aircraft could be evacuated within 90 seconds of the commencement of an evacuation, and passengers seated in overwing exits are now instructed to assist in an emergency.

== Aircraft ==
The aircraft involved was a McDonnell Douglas DC-9-32, MSN 47196, originally registered as CF-TLU, that was manufactured on 22 March 1968 and was delivered to Air Canada on 7 April. It had logged 36,825 airframe hours and 34,987 takeoff and landing cycles and was powered by two Pratt & Whitney JT8D-7B turbofan engines.

== Flight and crew ==
At 16:25 central daylight time (21:25 UTC) (Note: The NTSB describes all times in its final report using Eastern Daylight Time.) on 2 June 1983, Flight 797 took off from Dallas/Fort Worth International Airport. The flight was a regularly scheduled passenger flight operated by Air Canada using a McDonnell Douglas DC-9-32 (aircraft registration C-FTLU). The flight was scheduled to make a stop at Toronto International Airport, ultimately bound for Montreal's Dorval Airport.

The flight's captain, Donald Cameron (age 51), had been employed by Air Canada since March 1966, and had qualified as a DC-9 captain in November 1974. At the time of the accident, Cameron had approximately 13,000 flight hours, of which 4,939 were in the DC-9. First Officer Claude Ouimet (age 34) had flown for Air Canada since November 1973. He had about 5,650 hours of flight experience, including 2,499 hours in the DC-9, and had qualified as a DC-9 first officer in February 1979.

== Accident ==
=== Fire ===
While the flight was over Louisville, Kentucky across Indianapolis Center, a fire started in or around the rear lavatory of the aircraft. The pilots heard a popping sound around 18:51 EDT (22:51 UTC), during dinner service, and discovered that the lavatory's circuit breakers had tripped. Captain Cameron's initial attempt to reset the circuit breakers was unsuccessful. According to the flight crew and other Air Canada flight personnel, it was not uncommon for a plane's lavatory circuits to pop occasionally.

At about 19:00, a passenger seated in the last row informed flight attendant Judi Davidson of a strange odor in the rear of the airplane. Davidson traced the odor to the aft lavatory. Davidson attempted to check on the lavatory by opening the door a few inches. At that time she observed the lavatory full of light grey smoke, but did not see flames. Davidson asked flight attendant Laura Kayama to find chief flight attendant Sergio Benetti, who entered the lavatory to investigate.

Benetti saw no flames, but did see curls of thick black smoke coming out from the seams around the walls of the lavatory. While Benetti sprayed the interior of the lavatory with a CO_{2} fire extinguisher, Kayama moved passengers on the sparsely populated flight forward, and opened air vents to let more fresh air into the cabin. Kayama also went to the cockpit, and at 19:02, informed the flight crew of a "fire in the washroom". Captain Cameron put on his oxygen mask and ordered First Officer Ouimet to go back and investigate.

Ouimet found that thick smoke was filling the last three to four rows of seats, and he could not reach the aft lavatory. Benetti informed Ouimet that he did not see the source of the fire, but had doused the lavatory with fire retardant. Benetti told Ouimet that he did not believe the fire was in the trash bin.

At 19:04, Ouimet returned to the cockpit, told Cameron about the smoke, and suggested descending. However, Ouimet did not report Benetti's comment that the fire was not a mere trash bin fire. A few seconds later, Benetti came to the cockpit and told the captain that passengers were moved forward and that the smoke was "easing up." Cameron sent Ouimet back to try inspecting the aft lavatory again.

At 19:06, while Ouimet was out of the cockpit, Benetti again told Cameron that he thought the smoke was clearing. The captain, still believing the fire was in the lavatory trash bin, had not started descending because he expected the fire would be put out. Shortly after, the "master caution" light in the cockpit illuminated, indicating a loss of main bus electrical power. The captain called the air traffic controller (ATC) in Indianapolis, Indiana, and notified them that Flight 797 had an "electrical problem." Flight 797's transponder signal then disappeared from ATC radar displays; ATC was able to monitor the flight by switching to primary radar tracking.

At 19:07, Ouimet reached the aft lavatory again. He reached to open the door, but because it felt hot to the touch, he decided not to open it. Ouimet directed the flight attendants to keep the lavatory door closed, then returned to the cockpit, where he told Cameron, "I don't like what's happening, I think we better go down, okay?" Cameron detected urgency in Ouimet's voice, which he took to mean an immediate descent was needed.

Just after Ouimet returned to the cockpit, the cockpit "master warning" light lit up, warning the pilots of a loss of emergency electrical power. Cameron ordered Ouimet to switch to battery power, but the loss of main and emergency electrical power caused some electrical systems to fail, including power for the horizontal stabilizer. This caused the stabilizer to be stuck in the cruising position. This made controlling the plane's descent extremely difficult and required great physical exertion from the pilot and first officer. In addition, both flight recorders stopped recording at this point.

=== Descent ===
At 19:08 (23:08 UTC), Captain Cameron began an emergency descent and declared "mayday, mayday, mayday" to Indianapolis ATC. (Note: "Mayday" is the international radio distress signal; when repeated three times, it indicates imminent and grave danger and a request for immediate assistance.) Controllers granted Flight 797 clearance to descend for an emergency landing at Cincinnati/Northern Kentucky International Airport in Boone County, Kentucky, near Cincinnati, Ohio. Because the loss of electrical power had impaired some flight instruments, controllers had to direct Flight 797 to the airport using a "no gyro" approach, with the controller observing Flight 797 on radar and directing the flight to make turns based on radar position and heading.

Smoke filled the passenger cabin and entered the cockpit as the plane descended. The PA system also failed, leaving the flight attendants unable to communicate efficiently with the passengers. Nevertheless, attendants were able to move all passengers forward of row 13, and to instruct passengers sitting in exit rows on how to open the doors, a practice that was not standard on commercial airline flights at the time.

=== Landing and evacuation ===
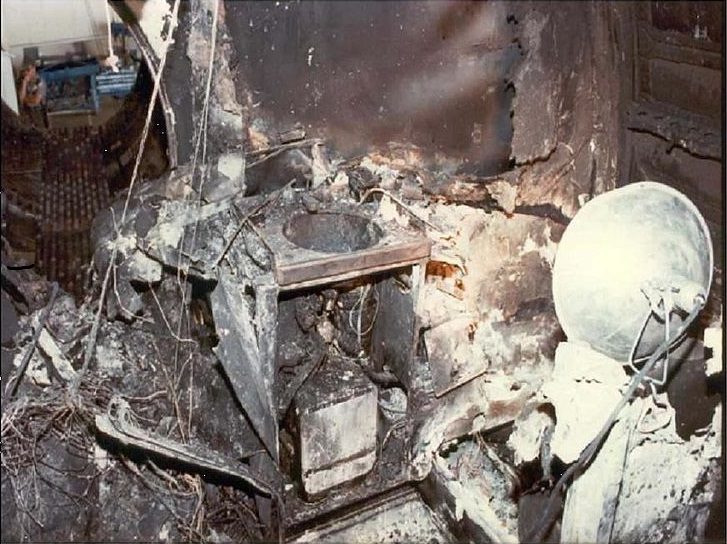
Fire damage in the aircraft lavatory, the point of origin of the fire.

At 19:20 (23:20 UTC), Captain Cameron and First Officer Ouimet executed an extremely difficult landing at Cincinnati/Northern Kentucky International Airport. Four tires blew out during the landing. Once the plane came to a stop, chief flight attendant Sergio Benetti opened the front door of the aircraft, through which he escaped. The pilots quickly shut the airplane down. The overwing and forward aircraft doors were opened, and slides at the front doors were deployed. The three flight attendants and 18 of the passengers evacuated using these exits. Opening the doors also caused an influx of air that fuelled the fire.

The pilots were unable to enter the passenger cabin because of the smoke and heat. Ouimet escaped through the right emergency window shortly after the plane landed, but Cameron, who was exhausted from trying to keep the plane under control, was unable to move and barely conscious. Firefighters doused Cameron in firefighting foam through the right window, shocking him back to awareness. Cameron was then able to open the left emergency escape window and drop to the ground, where Ouimet dragged him to safety. Cameron was the last person to escape the plane.

Less than 90 seconds after touchdown, the interior of the plane ignited, killing the remaining 23 passengers on board, who died from smoke inhalation and burns from the fire. Of the 18 surviving passengers, three received serious injuries, 13 received minor injuries and two were uninjured. None of the five crew members sustained any injuries. Survivor Dianne Fadley remarked: "It was almost like anybody who got out had nothing wrong... You made it and you were completely fine, or you didn't make it." The fire completely destroyed the aircraft.

Twenty-one Canadians and two Americans died. Many of the victims' bodies were burned beyond recognition. Almost all of the victims were in the forward half of the aircraft between the wings and the cockpit. Some victims were found in the aisle, while others were still in their seats. Two victims were found in the rear of the aircraft even though all passengers had been moved forward after the fire had been detected; these two victims were likely disoriented in the confusion that ensued upon landing and evacuation. Blood samples from the bodies revealed high levels of cyanide, fluoride and carbon monoxide, chemicals produced by the burning plane.

== Investigation ==
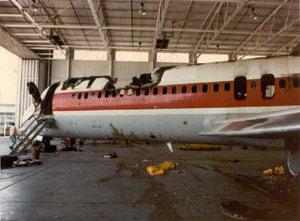
Fire damage in the front section of the aircraft.

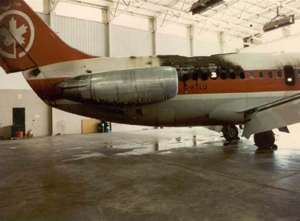
Fire damage in the rear of the aircraft around the aft lavatory.

Because the accident occurred in the United States, it was investigated by the National Transportation Safety Board (NTSB).

Although the fuselage was nearly destroyed by the intensity of the fire, the cockpit voice recorder (CVR) and flight data recorder (FDR) were still in good condition and produced vital data for the NTSB investigation. On the CVR, NTSB investigators heard eight sounds of electrical arcing beginning at 18:48. The arcing sounds repeated each time that the crew tried to reset the lavatory circuit breakers. Both pilots testified that they did not hear any arcing, and the NTSB concluded that these sounds would be inaudible to the flight crew. Although a number of wires in the lavatory section were later found with insulation stripped away, NTSB investigators were unable to determine whether this insulation damage was the cause of the fire or was caused by the fire.

This particular DC-9 had experienced a number of problems over the months leading up to the incident; 76 maintenance reports had been filed in the plane's logs in the previous year, and the CVR recorded Captain Cameron telling First Officer Ouimet to "put [the tripping breakers] in the book there" when the breakers failed to respond to the first reset attempt at 18:52. Cameron attempted once more to reset the breakers at 18:59. The CVR recorded arcing sounds followed by the popping sound of the breakers continuing to trip again after each reset over the next 60 seconds.

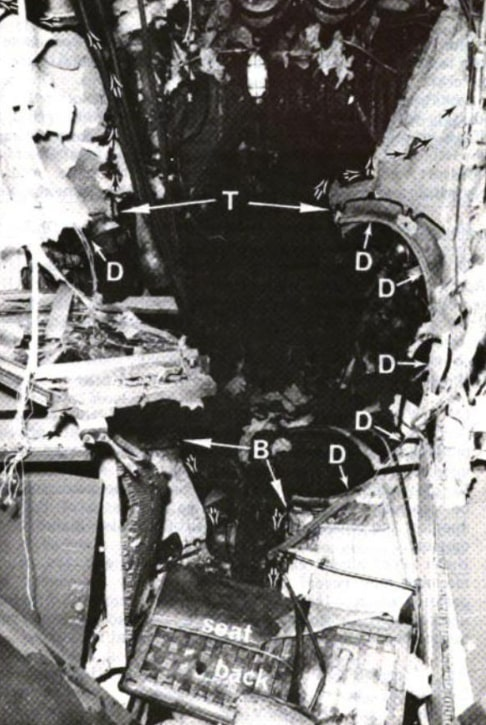
The tail section of C-FTLU after the 1979 emergency landing on Flight 680

On 17 September 1979, the plane, then serving as Air Canada Flight 680 from Boston, Massachusetts, to Yarmouth, Nova Scotia, had suffered an explosive decompression in the rear bulkhead that required rebuilding the tail section and replacing or splicing most of the wiring and hydraulic lines in the back of the plane. Cameron later noted that the Air Canada maintenance crew "did a heck of a job getting everything put back together" after the decompression incident. Investigators were unable to find signs of arcing in any of the wire splices from the repairs done four years earlier, though much of the wiring in the rear of the plane was severely damaged or destroyed by the fire itself.

=== Initial findings ===
The NTSB was ultimately unable to determine the origin of the fire. In August 1984, the NTSB issued a final report that, while praising the captain for "exhibiting outstanding airmanship without which the airplane and everyone on board would certainly have perished", concluded that the probable causes were a fire of undetermined origin, the flight crew's underestimation of the fire's severity and conflicting fire-progress information given to the captain. This report also found that the flight crew's "delayed decision to institute an emergency descent" contributed to the severity of the accident.

=== Outcome and revised report ===
Captain Cameron later said:

All I know was that I did the best I could, I'm very sorry the people that didn't get off, didn't get off, because we spent a lot of time and effort getting them there.

After the NTSB issued its report, a number of commercial pilots and airline personnel petitioned the NTSB to revise its report. In addition, First Officer Ouimet sent the NTSB a detailed defence of the crew's actions, including the decision to land in Cincinnati instead of at Standiford Field Airport in Louisville, Kentucky, the airport closest to Flight 797 when the crew first declared an emergency. Ouimet stated that Louisville was too close to be able to descend from cruising altitude to an emergency landing safely, and even landing in Cincinnati was a questionable proposition given Cameron's difficulties in controlling the plane.

In January 1986, after reviewing Ouimet's missive and reevaluating the available data, the NTSB issued a revised version of its accident report. The revised report included Ouimet's explanation of the landing decision. The report was still critical of Cameron's decision not to inquire about the fire itself. However, in its revised report, the NTSB revised its probable-cause finding to describe the fire reports given to Cameron as "misleading" instead of merely "conflicting" information. The NTSB also removed the word "delayed" from its description of the pilots' decision to descend, instead listing the "time taken to evaluate the nature of the fire and to decide to initiate an emergency descent" as a contributing factor.

The crew of Flight 797 were later honoured by multiple Canadian aviation organizations for their heroic actions in landing the plane safely.

=== Safety recommendations ===
As a result of this accident and other incidents of in-flight fires on passenger aircraft, the NTSB issued several recommendations to the Federal Aviation Administration (FAA), including:

- Safety Recommendation A-83-70, which asked the FAA to expedite actions to require smoke detectors in lavatories.
- Safety Recommendation A-83-71, which asked the FAA to require the installation of automatic fire extinguishers adjacent to and in lavatory waste receptacles.
- Strong recommendation for expedited FAA rule changes mandating that all U.S.-based air carriers install (or improve existing) in-cabin fire safety enhancements, including (but not limited to):
  - Fire-blocking seat materials to limit both the spread of fire and the generation of toxic chemicals through ignition.
  - Emergency track lighting at or near the floor, strong enough to cut through heavy fuel fire smoke.
  - Raised markings on overhead bins indicating the location of exit rows to aid passengers in locating these rows in case of passenger visual impairment (either preexisting or caused by emergency conditions).
  - Hand-held fire extinguishers using advanced technology extinguishing agents such as halon.

== Notable passengers ==
Canadian folk singer Stan Rogers, 33, was killed by smoke inhalation. Rogers was known for songs such as "Northwest Passage", "The Mary Ellen Carter", and "Barrett's Privateers". He was returning home after attending the Kerrville Folk Festival in Texas.

George Curtis Mathes Jr., the chairman of the board and public face of the Curtis Mathes Corporation, a maker of high-end home electronics, was also killed in the incident.

A diagram of Air Canada Flight 797 from the NTSB; the diagram indicates locations of surviving passengers, deceased passengers and flight attendants

== Dramatizations ==
The Discovery Channel Canada/National Geographic TV series Mayday (also titled Air Crash Investigation, Air Emergency and Air Disasters) featured the accident in a 2007 episode titled "Fire Fight", which includes interviews with survivors and accident investigators as well as a dramatic recreation of the flight.

It is featured in season 1, episode 4, of the TV show Why Planes Crash, in an episode called "Fire in the Sky".
