= Fogarty's Cove =

Studio album by Stan Rogers
- Released: 1977
- Recorded: September 23–24, 1976
- Studio: Springfield Sound; Springfield, Ontario
- Genre: Folk
- Length: 39:30
- Label: Barn Swallow Records
- Producer: Paul Mills

Stan Rogers chronology
Fogarty's Cove (1977)	Turnaround (1978)

Alternative cover
- Borealis cover

Professional ratings
Review scores
Source	Rating
Allmusic	Fogarty's Cove at AllMusic

Fogarty's Cove is a 1977 folk music album by Stan Rogers. It was his first album, released by Barnswallow Records, which was then purchased by Stan Rogers and made into Fogarty's Cove Records.

The CD was one of several Stan Rogers albums reissued in 2011 by Borealis Records. The reissued CDs featured completely new cover artwork.

== Track listing ==
No.	Title	Length
1.	"Watching the Apples Grow"	1:47
2.	"Forty-Five Years"	3:26
3.	"Fogarty's Cove"	2:10
4.	"Maid on the Shore"	3:38
5.	"Barrett's Privateers"	4:14
6.	"Fisherman's Wharf"	3:56
7.	"Giant"	3:33
8.	"Rawdon Hills"	3:31
9.	"Plenty of Hornpipe"	1:52
10.	"The Wreck of the Athens Queen"	2:54
11.	"Make and Break Harbour"	4:23
12.	"Finch's Complaint/Giant" (reprise)	3:05
