= Garnet Rogers =

- Born: 3 May 1955 (age 71); Hamilton, Ontario, Canada
- Relatives: Stan Rogers (brother)
- Musical career
- Occupation: Singer-songwriter
- Instruments: Guitar, fiddle, vocals
- Label: Snow Goose
- Website: garnetrogers.com

Garnet Rogers (born May 1955) is a Canadian folk musician, singer, songwriter and composer. He was born in Hamilton, Ontario with Maritime roots.

== Early life ==
Rogers was born in Hamilton, Ontario to Nathan Allison Rogers and Valerie (née Bushell) Rogers, who had moved to Ontario from Nova Scotia to find work. Rogers, along with his elder brother Stan, was raised in Binbrook, Ontario, and spent summers in Guysborough County, Nova Scotia.

== Career ==
Rogers began his professional career working with his brother Stan, arranging Stan's music.

After Stan died in a plane crash on June 2, 1983 (just a few weeks before Stan, Garnet and bass player Jim Morison were to tour the US), Garnet began to pursue his own career.

At first, Rogers had difficulty getting a permit from the U.S. Immigration Service, which only granted one after a campaign on his behalf was launched by Odetta, The Boston Globe, and a PBS TV station in New York.

While his brother's style of writing was more traditional and often based on Canadian Maritime styles, Rogers' style is more modern, utilizing influences from blues, rock, country/bluegrass, and classical.

Rogers' instruments include the guitar, mandolin, violin, and flute. In live performances, he usually sits beside a guitar rack that includes three vintage Gibson acoustic guitars, a National guitar, a Fender Stratocaster, and sometimes a Hammertone Octave 12 (half-scale electric 12-string guitar).

Rogers' songs include The Outside Track, All That Is, Sleeping Buffalo, Night Drive, Under The Summer Moonlight, Summer Lightning, Small Victory, and Frankie and Johnny. They range from slices of life to mild social commentary and humour. His humour is also seen in his on-stage banter between songs, mostly unrecorded, except for a couple of interludes on his brother's posthumous album, "Home in Halifax". In addition, Garnet has covered other folk artists' work, including Roy Forbes' (Bim's) Woh Me, and Archie Fisher's The Final Trawl. His collaborators include Doug McArthur and Doug Long.

Rogers has also written "Night Drive," a memoir of his travels with his brother Stan, who died in a fire aboard an Air Canada flight in 1983.

== Personal life ==
Garnet lives on a farm in Brantford, Ontario, where his wife Gail raises champion thoroughbreds. They also own a house in Nova Scotia.

== Solo albums ==
- Garnet Rogers (1984)
- The Outside Track (1985)
- Speaking Softly in the Dark (1988)
- Small Victories (1990)
- At A High Window (1992)
- Summer Lightning [Live] (1994)
- Night Drive (1996)
- Sparrow's Wing (1999)
- Firefly (2001)
- Shining Thing (2004)
- Get a Witness [Live] (2007)
- Summer's End (2014)

== Other albums ==
- Off the Map with Archie Fisher (1986)
- Doug McArthur with Garnet Rogers (1989)
- All That Is (The Songs of Garnet Rogers) (2002) [Red House Records]
- Live at the Black Sheep (2003)
- The Best Times After All [Live] with Archie Fisher (2019)

== See also ==
- Eileen McGann—Irish-Canadian female Celtic folksinger. They started out professionally in the same timeframe, played many of the same venues in their early days, and Garnet Rogers appeared on some of her early recordings.
- Gordon Lightfoot
- Roy Orbison
