= Stan Rogers =

Canadian folk musician (1949–1983)

Background information
- Born: Stanley Allison Rogers; November 29, 1949; Hamilton, Ontario, Canada
- Died: June 2, 1983 (aged 33) Hebron, Kentucky, U.S.
- Genre: Folk
- Occupation: Singer-songwriter
- Instruments: Guitar, vocals
- Years active: 1970–1983
- Labels: RCA, Fogarty's Cove, Borealis
- Spouse: Ariel Rogers (married 1977)
- Website: stanrogers.net

Stanley Allison Rogers (November 29, 1949 – June 2, 1983) was a Canadian folk musician and songwriter who sang traditional-sounding songs frequently inspired by Canadian history and the working people's daily lives, especially from the fishing villages of Atlantic Canada and, later, the farms of the Canadian prairies and Great Lakes. He died in a fire aboard Air Canada Flight 797, grounded at the Greater Cincinnati Airport, at the age of 33.

== Early life and musical development ==
Rogers was born in Hamilton, Ontario, the eldest son of Nathan Allison Rogers and Valerie (née Bushell) Rogers, two Maritimers who had relocated to Ontario in search of work shortly after their marriage in July 1948. Although Rogers was raised in Binbrook, Ontario, he often spent summers visiting family in Guysborough County, Nova Scotia.

It was there that he became familiar with the way of life in the Maritimes, an influence which was to have a profound impact on his subsequent musical development. He was interested in music from an early age, reportedly beginning to sing shortly after learning to speak. He received his first guitar, a miniature hand-built by his uncle Lee Bushell, when he was five years of age. He was exposed to a variety of music influences, but among the most lasting were the country and western tunes his uncles would sing during family get-togethers. Throughout his childhood, he would practice his singing and playing along with his brother Garnet, six years his junior.

While Rogers was attending Saltfleet High School, Stoney Creek, Ontario, he started to meet other young people interested in folk music, although at this time he was dabbling in rock and roll, singing and playing bass guitar in garage bands such as "Stanley and the Living Stones" and "The Hobbits". After high school, Rogers briefly attended both McMaster University and Trent University, where he performed in small venues with other student musicians, including Ian Tamblyn, Christopher Ward and fellow Hobbit Nigel Russell. Russell wrote the song "White Collar Holler", which Rogers sang frequently on stage.

Rogers signed with RCA Records in 1970 and recorded two singles: "Here's to You Santa Claus" in 1970, and "The Fat Girl Rag" in 1971. In 1973, Rogers recorded three singles for Polygram: "Three Pennies", "Guysborough Train", and "Past Fifty."

In 1976, Rogers recorded his debut album, Fogarty's Cove, released in 1977 on Barnswallow Records. The album's subject matter dealt almost entirely with life in maritime Canada, and was an immediate success. Rogers then formed Fogarty's Cove Music, and bought Barnswallow during the production of Turnaround, allowing him to release his own albums. Posthumously, additional albums were released.

Sung in his rich baritone, Rogers' songs are often said to have a "Celtic" feel which is due, in part, to his frequent use of DADGAD guitar tuning. He regularly used his William 'Grit' Laskin-built 12-string guitar in his performances. His best-known songs include "Northwest Passage", "Barrett's Privateers", "The Mary Ellen Carter", "Make and Break Harbour", "The Idiot", "Fogarty's Cove", and "White Squall".

== Death ==
Rogers died alongside 22 other passengers most likely of smoke inhalation on June 2, 1983, while travelling on Air Canada Flight 797 (a McDonnell Douglas DC-9) after performing at the Kerrville Folk Festival. The airliner was flying from Dallas, Texas, to Toronto and Montreal when a fire from an unknown ignition source within the vanity or toilet shroud of the aft washroom forced it to make an emergency landing at the Greater Cincinnati Airport in northern Kentucky. There were initially no visible flames, and after attempts to extinguish the fire were unsuccessful, smoke filled the cabin. Upon landing, the plane's doors were opened, allowing the five crew and 18 of the 41 passengers to escape, but approximately 90 seconds into the evacuation the oxygen rushing in from outside caused a flash fire.

Soon after his death, stories began to circulate about Rogers' final moments. Blogger Amber Frost claimed:

Before most likely succumbing to smoke inhalation, he used his last moments to guide other passengers to safety with his booming voice. I've heard more than one Canuck proudly declare that for all Rogers' odes to Canada, he was never more Canadian than in his final words: "Let me help you."

These accounts cannot be verified, as the National Transportation Safety Board ran a full investigation of the incident and interviewed every single survivor, and there is no firsthand account, official or unofficial, of such an occurrence. Stan Rogers most likely died before the doors were even opened, due to smoke inhalation from the fire. Regardless, the circumstances of Rogers' death still circulate as folklore. As his official biographer Christopher Gudgeon writes:

At the funeral, it is said, a statue of the Virgin Mary began to vibrate. A lone eagle soared above the gravesite and landed on the casket just as it was about to be lowered. Since in truth there was no burial at all, it's clear that some of these rumors are the product of overactive imaginations. From the ashes of flight 797, a new figure emerged: Saint Stan. He was an extension of Rogers' Maritime Stan persona, only rougher and saltier still, with a heart of gold, a golden voice, and not a spot on him. Garnet calls it the 'Elvisization' of his brother. In death, we discovered Stan Rogers, bigger than ever.

His ashes were scattered off the north-eastern shore of Nova Scotia, Canada.

== Legacy ==
Rogers' legacy includes his recordings, songbook, and plays for which he was commissioned to write music. His songs are still frequently covered by other musicians, including children's performer Raffi on his 1977 out-of-print album Adult Entertainment, and are perennial favourites at Canadian campfires and song circles. Members of Rogers' band, including his brother Garnet Rogers, continue to be active performers and form a significant part of the fabric of contemporary Canadian folk music. Following his death, he was nominated for the 1984 Juno Awards in the category for Best Male Vocalist. That same year, he was posthumously awarded the Diplôme d’Honneur of the Canadian Conference of the Arts. In 1994, his posthumous live album Home in Halifax was likewise nominated for Best Roots and Traditional Album.

His widow, Ariel, continues to oversee his estate and legacy. His music and lyrics have been featured in numerous written publications and films. For instance, his lyrics have appeared in school poetry books, taking their place alongside acknowledged classics. His song "Northwest Passage" was featured in the last episode of the TV show Due South, his songs "Barrett's Privateers" and "Watching the Apples Grow" having been previously featured. "Barrett's Privateers" has also been used extensively in promotion ads for Alexander Keith's ale. In the 2005 CTV made-for-TV movie on the life of Terry Fox, Rogers' "Turnaround" is the music over the closing shot. As the movie ends, Fox is depicted, alone, striding up a hill, while the lyric "And yours was the open road. The bitter song / The heavy load that I'll never share, tho' the offer's still there / Every time you turn around," forges a link between these Canadian icons. Many of his songs on the albums Northwest Passage and From Fresh Water refer to events in Canadian history.

Adrienne Clarkson, who, prior to serving as the Governor General of Canada from 1999 to 2005, had worked for the Canadian Broadcasting Corporation, highlighted Rogers' career in a 1989 television documentary called One Warm Line on CBC Television; she also quoted Rogers in her investitural address.

When CBC's Peter Gzowski asked Canadians to pick an alternate national anthem, "Northwest Passage" was the overwhelming choice.

The Stan Rogers Folk Festival is held every year in Canso, Nova Scotia. In 1995, several artists performed two nights of concerts at Halifax's Rebecca Cohn Auditorium, which were released on album that year as Remembering Stan Rogers, which peaked at number 36 on the RPM Country Albums chart.

Rogers is also a lasting fixture of the Canadian folk festival Summerfolk, held annually in Owen Sound, Ontario, where the main stage and amphitheater are dedicated as the "Stan Rogers Memorial Canopy". The festival is firmly fixed in tradition, with Rogers' song "The Mary Ellen Carter" being sung by all involved, including the audience and a medley of acts at the festival.

At The Canmore Folk Festival, Alberta's longest running folk music festival, performers take to the Stan Rogers Memorial Stage, which is the festival's main stage.

Stan's son, Nathan Rogers, is also an established Canadian folk artist with a voice and lyrical acumen similar to his father's. He has released two critically acclaimed solo albums and tours internationally as a solo act and in the trio Dry Bones.

In 1995, with permission from Estelle Rogers, Vancouver Celtic Rock band Three Row Barley released a live version of Barrett's Privateers on their album Overserved.

On his 2006 album Writing In The Margins, American folk musician John Gorka covered Rogers' song "The Lockkeeper". "That's How Legends Are Made," a song from Gorka's 1990 album Land of The Bottom Line, is also a tribute to Rogers.

In 2007, Rogers was recognized posthumously with a National Achievement Award at the annual SOCAN Awards held in Toronto.

In Chris Hadfield's 2013 autobiographical book An Astronaut's Guide to Life on Earth: What Going to Space Taught Me About Ingenuity, Determination, and Being Prepared for Anything, the astronaut remembers the song Northwest Passage being played by his family before a mission.

The 2019 album Into the North, by Canadian folk-punk band The Dreadnoughts, included a tribute song to Rogers titled "Dear Old Stan", which references multiple of his songs, including "The Flowers of Bermuda" and "Harris and the Mare".

In 2020, Canadian Premier League soccer club HFX Wanderers FC's home kit featured a soundwave image taken from Rogers' "Barrett's Privateers", inspired in part by the song's adoption by Privateers 1882, a supporters group of the Wanderers.

== Band ==
While occasionally performing or recording solo, Rogers typically worked with other musicians.

Early in his career, he was accompanied live by guitarist Nigel Russell.

In 1973 his brother, Garnet Rogers, joined as principal sideman and co-arranger. For the next 10 years, they performed live as a trio, joined by a succession of bassists, including Jim Ogilvie, David Woodhead, David Alan Eadie and Jim Morison.

This live trio was occasionally augmented by other musicians, as at a string of shows recorded for the 1979 live album Between the Breaks ... Live!, and a 1983 CBC radio broadcast (later released as Home in Halifax).

His studio albums typically featured the live trio augmented by a mix of studio musicians and special guests, with the exception of the 1983 album For the Family, which featured the unaccompanied trio, who also self-produced the album.

== Discography ==
=== Singles ===
- "Hail To You Santa Claus" b/w "Coventry Carol" (1970; RCA)
- "Fat Girl Rag" b/w "Seven Years Along" (1971, RCA)
- "Three Pennies"/"Past Fifty" b/w "Guysborough Train" (1974, CBC Promo)

=== Albums ===
- Fogarty's Cove (1977)
- Turnaround (1978)
- Between the Breaks ... Live! (1979)
- Northwest Passage (1981)
- For the Family (1983)
- From Fresh Water (1984)
- In Concert (1991)
- Home in Halifax (1993)
- Poetic Justice (1996) – A collection of two radio plays (Harris and the Mare, based on Stan Rogers' song of the same name, adapted by John Gavin Douglas for the CBC Radio series Nightfall, and The Sisters by Silver Donald Cameron, a play written for CBC Playhouse, for which Rogers wrote and performed the music.)
- From Coffee House to Concert Hall (1999)
- The Very Best of Stan Rogers (2011)
- The Collection 6 CD + 1 DVD Anthology (2013)
- Stan Rogers Songbook: Songs of a Lifetime 3 Vinyl + Song Book Anthology (2024)

== See also ==
- Canadian rock
- Music of Canada
