= Margaret Christl =

- Born: Scotland
- Genres: folk music
- Occupation: musician
- Instrument: singing
- Years active: 1960-present
- Labels: Folk-Legacy Records
- Website: http://www.mgl.ca/~jhcole/mc/

Margaret Christl is a Scottish-Canadian folksinger. Christl was born in England, grew up in Scotland and West Wales, and emigrated to Canada in 1966. She became active in the folk revival scene, playing many folk festivals, including the Mariposa Folk Festival, Vancouver Folk Music Festival, Edmonton Folk Festival and the Calgary Folk Music Festival, as well as the club and coffeehouse circuit. She worked with different folk labels over the years to release a number of works, most notably The Barley Grain for Me. This album was recorded with Ian Robb and William Laskin in 1976 via Folk-Legacy Records, and was dedicated to Edith Fowke, an influential scholar, folklorist, and collector of folk music in Canada.

Christl performed traditional Scottish and Canadian songs, as well as contemporary styles. She was often accompanied by guitarists, but also played the mountain dulcimer and the bodhrán. Christl frequently collaborated with Ian Robb, Grit (William) Laskin and Stewart Cameron.

== Other Resources ==
- Archival recording of Margaret Christl at the Mariposa Festival in 1975
- Program for a performance at a house concert in Berkley.
