= Eileen McGann (musician) =

- Born: Eileen T. McGann; Scarborough, Ontario, Canada
- Origin: Vancouver Island, British Columbia, Canada
- Genres: Celtic, Traditional, Contemporary, singer-songwriter
- Occupation(s): Musician, singer, songwriter, producer, artist
- Instrument(s): Voice, guitar
- Years active: 1984–present
- Labels: Dragonwing Music
- Website: eileenmcgann.com

Eileen McGann is an Irish-Canadian folk singer, songwriter and traditional Celtic musician. Her album, Beyond The Storm, was Juno Award-nominated in 2002. She has released seven solo CDs and has established an over 40-year career touring across North America and Great Britain.

== Biography ==
Eileen McGann was born in Scarborough, Ontario, Canada, to Irish parents and was the third of four children. The family gradually moved to Calgary, Alberta, with Eileen the last to join them in 1990, after completing her studies at the University of Toronto & the Pontifical Institute for Medieval Studies, followed by an MFA in Drama in England. In 1999, she moved to rural Vancouver Island, British Columbia, where she is now based.

== Musical career ==
Her musical career began in her teens, mainly singing Irish and Scottish traditional music in Toronto, and she was a member of the Fiddler's Green Folk Club where she performed on a regular basis. She began playing major Canadian folk festivals in 1984 and shortly thereafter began touring across Canada and the US. Her professional career began while she was still attending university—where she ultimately earned four degrees (BA, BEd and two MA's) in various subjects, including history, philosophy, theatre and medieval studies.

Her interpretations of Celtic traditional songs made her name quickly on the Canadian folk music scene. With the release of her first album, Elements (1986), which included seven of her own songs, McGann began to be redefined as a singer-songwriter, even though she continued to sing Celtic traditional music. This album garnered attention in Great Britain, including a favourable review in Folk Roots magazine, as well as North America; she played her first British festival, the Glasgow MayFest in 1987.

Her second album, Turn It Around (1991), was hailed as one of the top albums of the year by the Boston Globe newspaper.

Her 1995 release, Journeys, continued her practice of including a number of her own compositions along with interpretations of lesser-known traditional Celtic songs. Responding to the requests of traditional music fans, her 1997 CD, Heritage, was entirely traditional Celtic and British material and was distributed by Borealis Records in Canada and by Greentrax in Scotland (July 2013).

In 2001, McGann released Beyond The Storm, which received a 2002 Juno Award nomination in the category of Best Roots or Traditional Album – Solo.

In 2004 McGann released a compilation CD entitled Light, which included three new songs as well as a themed selection of songs from previous albums. The CD is described as "songs of hope, healing and the spiritual journey", and was brought about at the request of an Alberta-based healer's collective which had been using McGann's songs in their work as inspiration for their clients.

Her seventh solo CD, Pocketful of Rhymes, was released late in 2010, and comprises an eclectic collection of original and traditional songs. This album garnered McGann a 2011 Canadian Folk Music Awards (CFMA) nomination as "Traditional Singer of the Year".

Some of her best-known songs include "Too Stupid for Democracy," a take on various political systems; "Requiem (for the Giants)," a lament for the loss of old-growth forests; "Turn It Around," a portrait of homelessness, and other songs on environmental, political and social themes, as well as songs on wilderness and canoeing. Her songs have been recorded by other artists (including Roy Bailey, Bram Taylor and Herdman-Hills-Mangsen) and included on compilation CDs in Britain, the US and Canada. Often her songs convey a woman's point-of-view, or are about women in history (i.e., "Isabella Gunn") and in mythology.

All of McGann's CDs have been released on her own independent Dragonwing Music record label, which she began in 1986. Aside from her first album, McGann has been producer of her own CDs, with sideman and partner David K co-producing and engineering the most recent four releases.

In addition to performing at folk clubs, halls and festivals, McGann also teaches at a variety of music camps, and does individual workshops in songwriting, vocal styles, and traditional song.

== Songbook ==
In October 2011, BerLen Music of Ontario released The Eileen McGann Songbook, with 50 of her written and recorded songs, as part of the "Essential Canadian Songwriter Series." Three of her songs were included in the "Rise Again" songbook.

== Visual Artist ==
McGann is also a painter of colourful, semi-representational landscapes and treescapes, mostly of Western Canada. She has exhibited in gallery shows on Vancouver Island and elsewhere in British Columbia. She also has paintings in collections throughout North America and Europe. Eileen's art is included, with a two-page colour spread, in the book "Green Art: Trees, Leaves, and Roots."

In addition to her painting, McGann draws Celtic knotwork. She teaches classes, tutorials, and workshops in visual art, including how to draw Celtic knotwork designs freehand at music and arts festivals.

== Discography ==
=== Studio albums ===
Year	Album	Details
2010	Pocketful of Rhymes	*Dragonwing Music: DRGN 118
2004	Light	*Dragonwing Music: DRGN 117
2001	Beyond the Storm	*Dragonwing Music: DRGN 116
1997	Heritage	*Dragonwing Music: DRGN 005
1995	Journeys	*Dragonwing Music: DRGN 113
1991	Turn It Around	*Dragonwing Music: DRGN 112
1987	Elements	*Dragonwing Music: DRGN 111

=== Other ===
As part of "Trilogy" (Eileen McGann, Cathy Miller and David K):

Year	Album	Details
1996	Two Thousand Years of Christmas	*Dragonwing Music: DRGN 114

== Publications ==
- The Eileen McGann Songbook, BerLen Music, Guelph, Ontario, 2011

== See also ==
- Stephen Fearing—Canadian folk singer-songwriter. Accompanies McGann on some of her recordings.
- William "Grit" Laskin—Canadian luthier and musician. Often accompanies McGann on her recordings.
- Loreena McKennitt—fellow Irish-Canadian female Celtic folksinger. They started out in the same timeframe, played many of the same venues in their early days, and appeared together on several early compilation recordings.
- Garnet Rogers—Canadian folk musician. They started out professionally in the same timeframe, played many of the same venues in their early days, and Garnet Rogers appeared on some of her early recordings.
- Oliver Schroer—Canadian fiddler. Appeared on several of her recordings (and assisted in their production).
