= Owen McBride =

Irish folk singer (born 1941)

- Born: 1941 (age 84–85); Ireland
- Occupations: musician, folk singer

Owen McBride (born 1941) is an Irish-born folk singer and storyteller, primarily performing traditional Irish and Scottish music. McBride settled in Toronto in 1963 and became a fixture in the Toronto folk scene. McBride was a key figure in the folk revival movement in Canada and in North American in the 1960s and early 1970s, appearing at major folk music festivals like the Mariposa Folk Festival and the Philadelphia Folk Festivals. For this role, he was inducted in the Mariposa Folk Festival Hall of Fame in 2019. He continues to be an active performer in the folk music club and festival scenes.

== Career ==
McBride is a frequent performer at the Mariposa Folk Festival, the largest folk festival in Canada, performing almost every year from 1964 to the '80s and frequently in subsequent years. Hill has stated McBride "has performed at probably more Mariposa Festivals than any other individual" In July 2019 Owen was inducted into the Mariposa Folk Foundation Hall of Fame for his contributions to folk music in Canada and contributions to the Mariposa Folk Festival.

McBride was active in Toronto's important Yorkville coffeehouse folk music scene performing at venues such as the Mousehole, and Fiddler's Green, venues which also featured acts such as Joni Mitchell and Ian and Sylvia. Estelle Klein, artistic director for the Mariposa Festival, spotted McBride on a scouting mission for the Mariposa Festival and recruited him for the Festival line-up. McBride was also a fixture at folk music gatherings in the 1960s and early 1970s such as hootenanys held in Toronto venues and parks like Riverdale park. He also frequently appeared at college campuses such as York University, the University of Michigan and Michigan State University in the 1960s and 1970s.

A frequent performer at folk music festivals, McBride was featured in the inaugural Ann Arbor Festival in 1976 alongside musicians such as John Prine and Leon Redbone. He was frequently performed in festivals and venues with Redbone, Prine, and other and appeared in a 2018 documentary on career and legacy of Redbone. In 1970 McBride appeared at the Philadelphia Folk Festival with New York Times reporting his ballad performances as "sentimental and boozy". McBride continues to play at folk festivals, such as Home Country Folk Festival in London, Ontario.

McBride continues to perform folk music in the Toronto area appearing at a Yorkville event in 1987 to celebrate and remember the period where the neighbourhood was the centre of the folk revival movement in Canada. He is reported to own a guitar made by Canadian guitar builder William "Grit" Laskin.

McBride has made several commercial recordings, including one on the Philo Records (folk) label and his music has appeared in CBC radio documentaries, including a documentary produced in 1966 on the 50th anniversary of the Easter uprising in Ireland. His recordings are held in collections such as the Ralph Rinzler Folklife Archives and Collections, at the Smithsonian museum.

== Discography ==
- Owen McBride. vocals and guitar. Philo Stereo 1005. OCLC 317796483
- McBride, O. (1992). Laweesh Rock and other songs. Indreabhán, Conamara, Éire: Cló Iar-Chonnachta.
