= Ian Bell (musician) =

Canadian musician (born 1954)

Ian Bell (born 1954) is a Canadian folk musician, composer, and singer-songwriter who has been active in the Canadian folk music scene since the 1970s. With Anne Lederman, he was part of the seminal Canadian folk group Muddy York. He has been the leader of The Dawnbreakers and Professor Chalaupka's Celebrated Singing School. Bell has performed at the Edmonton Folk Music Festival and the Mariposa Folk Festival, among others. He has contributed to the development and preservation of Canadian folk music for more than twenty-five years. He sings both old songs and his own original compositions. His music has a Celtic flavour. He is a versatile musician who plays several instruments.

Bell spent most of his time as a part-time musician, also working in museums, the last being curator of the Port Dover Harbour Museum on Lake Erie. He left the museum in 2013 and has been working in music and art since.

== Early life ==
Bell was born in Simcoe, Ontario, grew up in Waterford, and lives now in Paris, Ontario. Some of his original songs evoke the landscape and history of southwestern Ontario.

== Career ==
Bell's career includes composing and playing instrumental music, singing, songwriting, storytelling, artist in residence, director of music festivals, and working as a freelance broadcaster.

His original songs have many themes: blacksmiths, bikers, Charles Atlas, woolly mammoths, fishermen, and love. His performances include his own stories: "funny, touching, unlikely, mostly true, and always entertaining." Venues range from Roy Thomson Hall to barns and from the Glenn Gould Studio to rural church basements and art galleries.

=== Performance ===
In 1978, Ian Bell, Kate Murphy, and Anne Lederman joined up to form Muddy York, to play the traditional songs and dance music of Canada, especially Ontario. The group's name, Muddy York, refers to an old epithet for Toronto. (See Name of Toronto.) They played in venues from church basements to barn dances to festivals, in Ontario and the western provinces. In 1982, Kate Murphy left the group but Bell and Lederman continued. They became well known and played at Expo 86 in Vancouver, British Columbia.

Bell has performed at the Edmonton Folk Festival (Alberta) and the Mariposa Folk Festival (Ontario) as well as festivals in Ottawa, Ontario, Winnipeg, Manitoba, Owen Sound, Ontario, Lunenberg, Nova Scotia, Montmagny, and Yellowknife, Northwest Territories.

Bell was Folk Artist in Residence for 1993 at Joseph Schneider Haus Museum in Kitchener, Ontario.

==== Recent performance history ====
In 2004, Bell performed in the "Roots of American Music" Festival at the Lincoln Center in New York City.

In July 2005, Bell and Anne Lederman travelled to Estonia to perform at the Viljandi Folk Festival. Also in 2005, he told the story of the youth and growth of Canadian artist Tom Thomson through music. This was in conjunction with a special exhibit about Thomson. The Durham West Arts Centre describes him as a noted musicologist, historian, and performer.

In March 2011, Muddy York and the O'Schraves played a benefit concert to raise money for the Matthews Memorial Hospital Association to hire a doctor for the hospital in the central Algoma district, on the north shore of Lake Huron. Muddy York also appeared in Sault Ste. Marie at an Algoma Traditional Music concert with Jeff Beck of the Cowboy Junkies and the O'Schraves. They have also worked at the Algoma Traditional Music Camp as both performers and teachers.

Bell appeared on dozens of recordings as a sideman as well as several under his own name. He plays guitar, button accordion, harmonica, mandolin, smallpipes, and fiddle. Bell still plays regularly for old-time square and contra dances across Southern Ontario. On these occasions, two or more musicians provide live music for the dancers.

Bell has played music with these performers:

- Wade Hemsworth
- Anne Lederman
- Dave Zdriluk
- Geoff Somers
- Tom Leighton
- David Woodhead
- Denis Rondeau
- Chris Schiller
- John Mayberry
- Ian Robb
- The Friends of Fiddler's Green
- Enoch Kent
- The Allison Lupton Band,
- Patio Dave & The Lanterns
- The Bilge Rats
- The Dawnbreakers: Kate Murphy, Brian Pickell & Geoff Somers

Bell's accompanists and bandmates have included these performers:

- Oliver Schroer – violin
- David Travers-Smith – trumpet, producer
- Geoff Somers – fiddle, mandolin
- Anne Lederman – fiddle, piano
- Brian Pickell – guitar, mandolin
- Tom Leighton – piano
- James Gordon – singer, guitarist

The CD My Pious Friends & Drunken Companions was nominated for a Canadian Folk Music Award—"Traditional Singer of The Year".

=== Musical contributions ===
Much of the early Ontario instrumental music on "Scatter the Ashes" was discovered through original research into the personal tune books of 19th-century Ontario musicians. Sources included the Allen Ash Manuscript, the John Buttrey manuscript, the James Dow manuscript, and the Ira Doan manuscript. Many of the songs were learned from period broadsides and newspapers and from field recordings.

Contributions to the music industry: Bell's original songs have been performed and recorded by, among others,

- Anne Lederman
- Ian Robb
- Bobby Watt
- Allison Lupton
- Lee Murdock

In 1985, Bell served as the artistic director of the Marioposa Folk Festival, a multi-day folk music festival that has been running in Ontario since 1961.

Contributions to CBC: As a long-time freelance broadcaster, he has often worked with Stuart McLean on CBC Radio's Vinyl Café. Bell has co-written and been music director for five Vinyl Café national concert broadcasts. For seven years he was a regular contributor to the weekend Fresh Air program on CBC radio. Over the years, Bell appeared several times on Peter Gzowski's Morningside as well as these CBC programs:

- Ideas
- Gabereau (Vicki Gabereau)
- Crossroads
- This Morning
- Radio Noon

Contributions to Canadian television shows: Bell has contributed to many film scores and performed period music for the TV series, The Road to Avonlea and appeared in some episodes.

=== Music education ===
Toronto's "Mariposa in the Schools" program is a charity started by the Mariposa Folk Foundation in 1970. For forty years, the program has been bringing performed art into Toronto schools: instrumental music, song, storytelling, puppeteering, and drama. Bell has been part of it for years and has developed several programs that share traditional music with young people. His school programs have been taught to classes ranging from Kindergarten to Gr. 8. the programs include these:

- Canadian Heritage Music - "Breathe life into Canadian history"
- Sound Production Program - "How do instruments work?" and instrument building classes
- From There to Here, From Then to Now - "celebrating our past through songs, dance, music, and humour"
- Unplugged but Resonant - "light-hearted exploration of the physics of sound on many traditional instruments"
- Tamaracker Down - "Old-time Ontario Step Dancing"

Bell was still delivering programs through MITS as recently as 2010.

== Discography ==
Bell's recordings include these albums:

- 2009 – My Pious Friends & Drunken Companions. traditional songs and tunes with Geoff Somers, Anne Lederman, Oliver Schroer, Denis Rondeau, The Bilge Rats, Pat O’Gorman, Shane Cooke and others.
- 2007 – Shallow Water. Original Songs and tunes music inspired by Port Dover and lakeside life.
- 2000 – Signor Farini & Other Adventures. Original Songs and traditional tunes, with The Dawnbreakers. Mostly original songs inspired by life in southwest Ontario. CDs available on request.
- 1996 – Free Range. Original Songs and instrumental music accompanied by the Dawnbreakers. CDs available on request.
- 1993 – Singing In A Strange Land. Shape note music from Waterloo Co., Ontario, on cassette tape
- 1992 – Brightest & Best. Early Christmas Music and shape note music, with Prof. Chalaupka’s Celebrated Singing School, on CD.
- 1991 – The Farmer Feeds Us All. Mostly traditional and historic music, on cassette tape. Out of print.
- 1990 – A Grand Musical Entertainment. Traditional and historic music, on cassette tape.
- 1984 – Scatter The Ashes - Muddy York. Innovative arrangements of old songs and fiddle tunes from the 19th-century Allen Ash (1818 – 1882) manuscript and other sources. with Anne Lederman.
