= The Banks of the Nile =

British traditional song

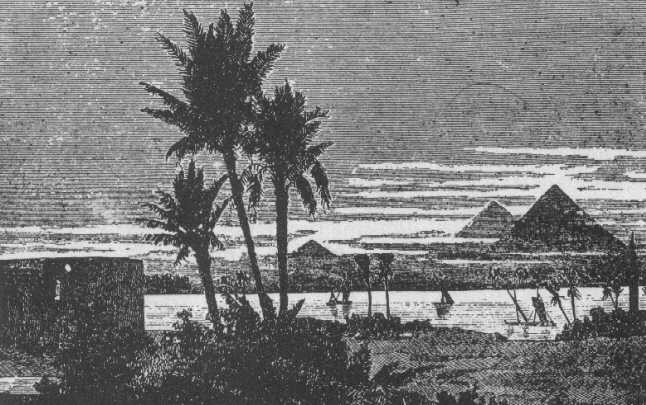
"The Nile at Old Cairo" as illustrated by H. B. Scammel, 1890.

The Banks of the Nile is a traditional British folk song and ballad. It is numbered as Roud number 950. It is a musical depiction of a conversation between a soldier and his wife, as the soldier makes preparations to depart for Portsmouth to be sent to Egypt to defend from French invasion. The song specifically is believed to have been written about the Battle of Abukir. Recordings of the song can be found at Cecil Sharp House and in BBC archives.

== Synopsis ==
The song is presented as a back-and-forth between the soldier, "Willie", and his wife or sweetheart (as it is left ambiguous), "Nancy". Willie begins by bidding farewell to Nancy, as he must leave forthwith for Portsmouth, as "tis many's the weary mile" to join his fellow soldiers on the Nile's titular banks.

Nancy responds that leaving her alone would grieve her sorely, requesting that Willie does not leave her at home to mourn his implied death at French hands. She goes on to state that she will follow him to Egypt by cutting her hair, dressing as a man and enlisting also.

Willie refutes this idea and notes that Nancy knows that his colonel has given the order that no woman will go along with them to Egypt. He asserts that the soldiers must make sacrifices and go boldly without their loves in order to claim victory: "We must forsake our own sweethearts upon their native isle / For to fight for fame and glory on the banks of the Nile."

The ballad then laments, from the perspective of Nancy, the perceived injustice of the war that has "robbed our country of many's the fine young man". Nancy expresses sadness that the soldiers have been taken from their sweethearts to fight in Egypt, to defend land that is not Britain's "native soil", and that it seems to be in futility as "their bodies lie a-mouldering on the banks of the Nile".

Willie responds optimistically, that when the war is over he and his fellow soldiers will return to Britain and to their wives and sweethearts, that they shall embrace their loves fondly when they come back, and that they shall "go no more to battle on the banks of the Nile".

== Origins ==
The song is believed to have been written around the time during the early 19th century though no specific author is known. As noted by Edith Fowke and Paul Adams separately in 1969 and 2003 it is suggested the ballad derives originally from a 1690 publication titled ′The Undaunted Seaman′.

== Recordings ==
- Sidney Richards on The Folk Songs of Britain Volume 8: A Soldier’s Life for Me (recorded 1952, published 1970)
- Ewan MacColl and Peggy Seeger on Classic Scots Ballads (1956)
- Jumbo Brightwell on Songs From the Singing Tradition of Snape Crown (recorded c. 1966, published 2000)
- The Young Tradition on Galleries (1968)
- LaRena Clark on A Canadian Garland (1969)
- Fotheringay with Sandy Denny (1970)
