= John Geggie =

Canadian bassist

- Born: Wakefield, Quebec, Canada
- Genres: Jazz
- Occupation: Bassist
- Instrument: Double bass
- Website: www.johngeggie.com

John Geggie is an Ottawa-based Canadian bassist (double bass) who performs jazz with several Ottawa-based groups and performers. As well, he is a classical bassist who has performed in the National Arts Centre Orchestra, in Ottawa-area chamber orchestras, and in chamber music concerts.

== Biography ==
=== Music training ===
Geggie was born and raised in Wakefield, Quebec, in the Gatineau Valley, which is a region in Quebec's Outaouais region, to the north of Ottawa. During his university studies at the University of Ottawa, Geggie studied with David Currie, then a bassist in Canada's National Arts Centre Orchestra. He did graduate studies with Larry Hurst and Bruce Bransby at Indiana University School of Music, graduating with a Master of Music degree in 1990. Geggie won a grant from the Canada Council, Canada's art granting council, which enabled him to study with bassist and solo artist Gary Peacock.

=== Career ===
Geggie performs in the Ottawa-Hull region as a freelance double bass player and teacher. He is best known for running the late-night jams during the Ottawa International Jazz Festival, and for his invitational series (in its tenth year as of 2010-11) of jazz concerts which run at the National Arts Centre Fourth Stage in Ottawa. In the latter series, Geggie invites jazz artists from across Canada and the world to play with him in one-time-only groups, in which they perform material written by each of the artists, as well as jazz standards. Geggie is a member of 'The Geggie Project', with pianist Marilyn Crispell and drummer Nick Fraser. Most recently they performed at the Guelph Jazz Festival on September 11, 2009. The concert was recorded by the Canadian Broadcasting Corporation (CBC) and broadcast on The Signal on October 3, 2009.

He was a member of the Angstones, an Ottawa band which "mix[ed] European and American folk music with zany lyrics and a jumping beat." The group consisted of Peter Kiesewalter on reeds (sax and clarinet) and accordion, Kurt Walther on guitar, Rob Frayne on sax, Geggie on bass, and Ian Mackie on drums. He has also recorded or performed with a wide range of improvisers: Vic Juris, Edward Simon, Seamus Blake, Jon Christensen, Andy Milne, Ben Monder, George Colligan, Craig Taborn, Sheila Jordan, David Murray, Andrew Cyrille, Donny McCaslin, Matt Brubeck, Ted Nash, Billy Hart, Marilyn Crispell, Myra Melford. Bill Carrothers, Cuong Vu and bassist Mark Dresser. Geggie has performed at various international jazz festivals including in Rouen and Maubeuge (France), in Molde (Norway) and throughout the United States.

He was a member of the now-defunct jazz quartet 'Chelsea Bridge (quartet)' and regularly performs with Toronto-based pianist and guitarist Justin Haynes and with Ottawa guitarist-composer Roddy Ellias. As well, he was a member of a Juno-nominated world beat group 'The Angstones'. He has toured with Chelsea Bridge, Angstones and D.D. Jackson. In addition, he has performed with singer/songwriters such as Ian Tamblyn, Lynn Miles, Three Sheets To The Wind and Meg Lunney.

Geggie performs in the double bass section of the National Arts Centre Orchestra, and the Ottawa-based 13 Strings Chamber Orchestra. He teaches double bass at Queen's University, Carleton University, the University of Ottawa and the Crane School of Music at SUNY Potsdam. More recently, Geggie has begun performing in a group called A Low Glow, with baritone saxophonist David Mott, as well as a duo with Toronto-based vocalist Julie Michels.

Zoë Anglessey of Down Beat Magazine has stated that "Geggie['s music] unfurls a sonorous bottom of rich arco drones..." (February, 1997) Mark Miller from Canada's The Globe and Mail (a national newspaper) has called him "A very hip bassist". A reviewer from Drums Etc. said that "John Geggie, surely one of Canada¹s premier upright bassists [is] inventive, frisky, yet always anchoring it all." (T. Bruce Wittet, Drums Etc., from November, 1999)

=== Composer ===
Geggie has composed and performed his own compositions for the Ottawa Chamber Music Festival as well for the CBC and Radio-Canada. He has also worked with several choreographers in the realization of music for dance pieces by Franco-Ontarian dancer Anik Bouvrette. In 1998, John composed and performed music in collaboration with Yvonne Coutts. Reviewer Richard Todd from the Ottawa Citizen stated that "Geggie's own work, Slices of Life,...a more cerebral piece...but it is eclectic and appealing, not to mention cunningly crafted" (August, 1998).

== Discography ==
- With Chelsea Bridge:
  - "Bone Dance" (Unity/Page)
  - Tatamagouche-Next Left (Unity/Page)
  - Blues In A Sharp Sea (Igmod 1065)
- With The Angstones:
  - "Bytown ... It's My Town" (Canal Records)
  - Kommen Een Der Karz (Canal Records, 1992)
- With Terry Tufts:
  - The Better Fight (Borealis Records 81172)
- With Ian Tamblyn
  - The Middle Distance (North Track Records, 1995)
- With Lynn Miles
  - Unravel (True North Records, 2001)
  - Love, Sweet Love (True North Records, 2005)
  - Winter (2015)
- With D.D. Jackson:
  - Peace-Song (Justin Time Records, 1994)
  - Rhythm-Dance (Justin Time Records, 1996)
- As a Bandleader
  - Geggie Project (Ambiances Magnétiques, 2010)
  - Across The Sky (Plunge Records, 2010)
