= Evalyn Parry =

Canadian theatre maker and singer-songwriter

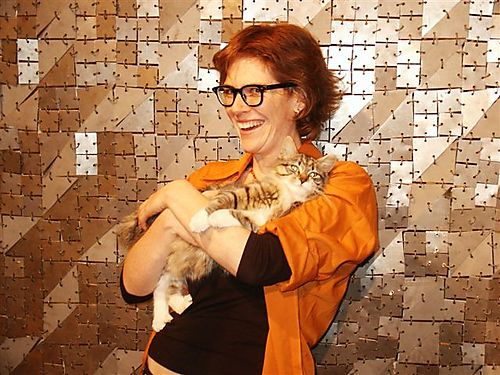
- Occupations: Singer; songwriter; playwright; director
- Known for: Spoken word; theatre; music
- Website: evalynparry.com

Evalyn Parry is a Canadian performance-maker, theatrical innovator and singer-songwriter. She grew up in Toronto, Ontario in the Kensington Market neighbourhood. Her music combines elements of spoken word and folk.

== Biography ==
Evalyn Parry is the daughter of David Parry, an English-born Canadian singer and theatrical director who died in 1995, and performer and author Caroline Balderston Parry. Her brother Richard Parry performs with the bands Bell Orchestre and Arcade Fire. She is married to Canadian writer Suzanne Robertson, and currently resides on farmland outside of Kingston, Ontario. She is an adjunct lecturer in the DAN School of Drama and Music at Queen's University.

== Theatre ==
Parry is a theatre creator, actor, director, collaborator and educator. Her plays and performances have been produced and toured nationally and internationally. From 2015 to 2020, Parry served as the artistic director of Buddies in Bad Times Theatre.

Parry's most recent collaborative work, Kiinalik These Sharp Tools, premiered at Buddies in 2017 and was presented at the Edinburgh International Festival (2019) and Cervantino Festival, Mexico (2019), Toronto's Luminato Festival, Vancouver's PuSh Festival (2019) and the GCTC (in collaboration with the National Arts Centre) (2020). Parry and co-creator/performer Laakkuluk Williamson Bathory were awarded the 2018 Dora Mavor Moore Award for Outstanding New Play for Kiinalik; Parry and musician/performer Cris Derksen were awarded the 2018 Dora Mavor Moore Award for Outstanding Sound Design/Composition.

Parry's acclaimed show SPIN, which features a bicycle played as a musical instrument (played by percussionist Brad Hart), charts the feminist history of the bicycle, and tells the story of Annie Londonderry, first woman to ride around the world on a bike in 1895. SPIN has toured festivals and theatres all over North America including Montreal's Edgy Women Festival in 2012.

Parry writes and performs with the acclaimed feminist theatre collective Independent Aunties with Anna Chatterton and Karin Randoja. The Aunties have created six shows together; their most recent production Gertrude and Alice, about the love and lives of Gertrude Stein and Alice B. Toklas, premiered at Buddies in Bad Times in 2016. It won a Toronto Theatre Critics Award, and was nominated for two Dora Mavor Moore Awards. Gertrude and Alice was remounted in 2018 as part of Buddies’ 40th Anniversary season, the same year the play was published by Playwrights Canada Press and was a shortlisted finalist for the 2018 Governor General's Award for English-language drama at the 2018 Governor General's Awards. The Independent Aunties other productions have been produced by Buddies in Bad Times (Clean Irene and Dirty Maxine—winner of Best New Play at SummerWorks, 2002); Theatre Passe Muraille (Frances, Mathilda and Tea, The Mysterious Shorts); The Theatre Centre (Breakfast—Dora Mavor Moore Award nomination); and The Cooking Fire Festival (Robbers’ Daughters). The Aunties’ Gertrude and Alice was co-produced with Buddies in Bad Times Theatre in March 2016;

Parry was appointed artistic director of Buddies in Bad Times, a queer theatre company in Toronto, in 2015, succeeding Brendan Healy. Prior to becoming artistic director, Parry served as the director of the Young Creators Unit at Buddies from 2007 to 2015. She was the recipient of the 2013 km Hunter Award for Theatre and the Ken McDougall Award for Directing (2009). In 2012, she directed Buddies' production of Tawiah M'carthy's Obaaberima, which was awarded the 2013 Dora for Outstanding Production; Parry also garnered a Dora Mavor Moore Award nomination for Outstanding Direction of a Play. Parry left buddies in Bad Times in September 2020. Prior to leaving, Parry said that she hoped the company would pursue other leadership models rather than having a traditional 'artistic director'.

== Music ==
Steeped in the folk tradition but born to innovate, Parry's genre-blurring work is inspired by intersections of social activism, history and autobiography, exploring themes that range from 19th century cycling heroines to bottled water, from queer identity to the quest for the Northwest Passage. Her unique combination of music and spoken word has been presented at folk festivals, theatres and campuses internationally; she has released five CDs of original music (with Borealis Records and her own Outspoke Productions). Parry performs solo and with a band. She was the inaugural recipient of the Colleen Peterson Songwriting Award (2003) and the Beth Ferguson Award for Upcoming Songwriter (Ottawa, 2001). Parry has performed at numerous music, poetry and Pride festivals across North America, including Hillside Festival, The Vancouver Folk Festival, North by Northeast Music and Film Conference and Festival (Toronto), the National Arts Centre (Ottawa), the Lincoln Center Out of Doors in New York City. Parry has also performed with the group Girls with Glasses, a quartet of female songwriters including Parry, Eve Goldberg, Allison Brown, and Karyn Ellis.

== Personal life ==
Parry is married to Suzanne Robertson.

== Plays ==
- Kiinalik: These Sharp Tools by Evalyn Parry, Laakkuluk Williamson Bathory, Erin Brubacher and Elysha Poirier with Cris Derksen
- 'Gertrude and Alice" by Evalyn Parry and Anna Chatterton, in collaboration with Karin Randoja
- SPIN by Evalyn Parry
- Breakfast by Evalyn Parry and Anna Chatterton
- Clean Irene and Dirty Maxine by Evalyn Parry and Anna Chatterton
- Francis Mathilda & Tea by Evalyn Parry and Anna Chatterton
- The Mysterious Shorts by Evalyn Parry and Anna Chatterton
- "The Freelance Lover" by Evalyn Parry
- Robbers Daughters' by Evalyn Parry and Anna Chatterton
- Nancy Drew Without a Clue, adapted by Evalyn Parry and Anna Chatterton

== Directing Credits ==
- 'Paradise Lost', by Erin Sheilds, Queen's University 2024
- 'The Dialysis Project', created by Leah Lewis, Robert Chafe and Evalyn Parry, Resource Centre for the Arts, St John's 2020
- 'The Youth / Elders Project', collaborative creation, Buddies in Bad Times Theatre 2017
- 'Obaaberima', by Tawiah Ben M'Carthy, Buddies in Bad Times Theatre 2012 // 2018
- 'Oh God, The Drums" by Brad Hart, Toronto Fringe 2012
- 'Fishbowl' by Mark Shyzer, Buddies in Bad Times Theatre 2010

== Discography ==
- Things that should be warnings (2001, LP)
- Unreasonable (2003, LP)
- Live at Lula (2006, concert DVD)
- Small Theatres (2007, double LP)
- SPIN (2011, LP)

== Awards ==
- Dora Mavor Moore Award for Outstanding New Play, Kiinalik These Sharp Tools, with Laakkuluk Williamson Bathory (2018)
- Dora Mavor Moore Award for Outstanding Sound Design/Composition, Kiinalik These Sharp Tools, with Cris Derksen (2018)
- KM Hunter Award for Theatre (2013)
- Ken McDougall Award for Emerging Director (2009)
- Colleen Peterson Songwriting Award (2003)
- Beth Ferguson Award for Upcoming Songwriter (Ottawa, 2001)

== Sources ==
- Fricker, Karen (October 27, 2017). "Kiinalik: These Sharp Tools powerfully connects audience to peoples and culture of the North: review. Show weaves Evalyn Parry's and Laakkuluk Williamson Bathory's personal experiences with broader cultural context". Toronto Star. Archived from the original on October 27, 2017.
- Nestruck, Kelly, "In Kiinalik: These Sharp Tools, collaboration produces beautiful music" The Globe and Mail October 2017
- Sumi, Glenn. "Youth/Elder Project is Revolutionary Theatre" NOW Magazine June 2017
- Sumi, Glenn "Queer pioneer does double duty at fest, nurturing new talent and critiquing two Canadian male icons on their idea of North" " NOW Magazine August 2014
- Porter, Catherine. " (subscription required)"The Toronto Star, 2010-17-05.
- Beeston, Laura, "Five habits that help Evalyn Parry keep pushing creative boundaries" The Globe and Mail September 2015
- Deschamps, MJ. "Evalyn Parry takes quirky tour across country", Xtra!, 2008-06-26. Retrieved 2008-07-10.
- Levesque, Roger. "Artist combines spoken word, song on 2-CD package", Edmonton Journal, 2008-07-01. Retrieved 2008-07-10.
- Nikodym, Carolyn. "Prevue – Evalyn Parry", Vue Weekly, 2008-07-03. Retrieved 2008-07-10.
- Varty, Alexander. "Straight white men and IKEA provide inspiration for Evalyn Parry", The Georgia Straight, 2008-07-03. Retrieved 2008-07-10.
