= Eve Goldberg =

Singer-songwriter based in Toronto, Canada

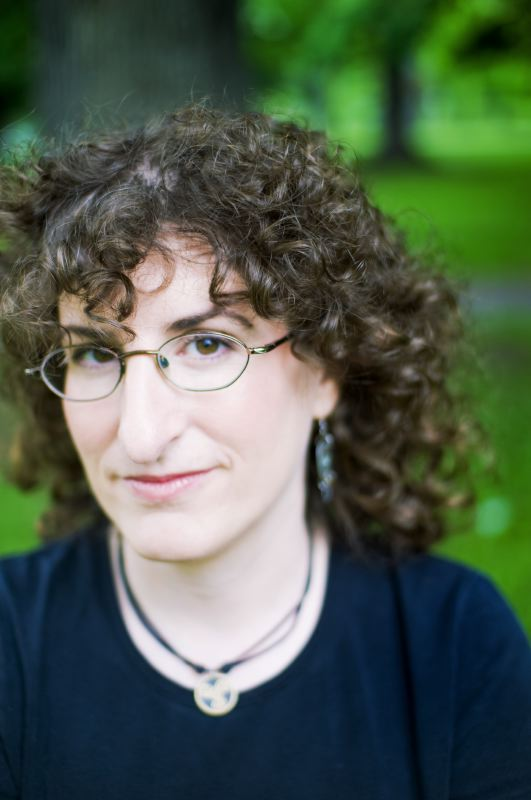
- Eve Goldberg

Background information
- Born: 1967 (age 58–59); Boston
- Genre: Folk music
- Occupation: Singer-songwriter
- Instruments: Guitar, ukulele
- Labels: Sweet Patootie Music, Borealis Records
- Website: evegoldberg.com

Eve Goldberg (born 1967) is a folk musician, singer and songwriter based in Toronto, Ontario, Canada. Musically, she draws from a number of different traditions and influences such as blues, country, bluegrass, jazz, swing, and contemporary and traditional folk music.

== Early life ==
Born in the Boston area, Goldberg mostly lived in New England before moving to Toronto in 1981 with her mother, Susan Goldberg. Through her mother, an avid folk music fan, Eve became involved in the Toronto folk music scene, and met many local folk musicians including Grit Laskin, Ian Robb, Ken and Chris Whiteley, Paul Mills, Bill Garrett, and others.

== Career ==
Goldberg began performing publicly in 1990, and since that time has performed at many clubs, concert series, and festivals throughout Canada and the north-eastern United States, including the Mariposa Folk Festival, the Kennedy Center, the Ottawa Folk Festival, the Stan Rogers Folk Festival.

Her first album, Ever Brightening Day, was released on her own Sweet Patootie Music label. Her next albums Crossing the Water, and A Kinder Season were both released by Borealis Records. Her instrumental composition "Watermelon Sorbet" was theme song to CBC Radio's Richardson's Roundup program. "Watermelon Sorbet" is also featured on a collection of acoustic guitar music called Six Strings North of the Border.

In addition to performing, Goldberg has been involved in many other music projects. In 1996, she became the office manager for The Borealis Recording Company, an independent Canadian folk music record label. In 1999, she helped found Common Thread: Community Chorus of Toronto, a seventy-voice non-audition folk choir that sings music from around the world.

Goldberg is one of the main organizers of The Woods Music and Dance Camp held every year in the Muskoka region of Ontario.

Goldberg also gives ukulele lessons and leads a ukulele group in Toronto. She performs with fellow musician Jane Lewis as the duo Gathering Sparks; the pair sing at folk festivals and also regularly at the Tranzac Club in Toronto. They released an album, All That's Real, on Borealis in 2019.

== Award ==
Goldberg's efforts to cultivate the folk-music community in Ontario led to her receiving the Estelle Klein Award from Folk Music Ontario in 2021.
