= Caroline Balderston Parry =

Canadian author (1945–2022)

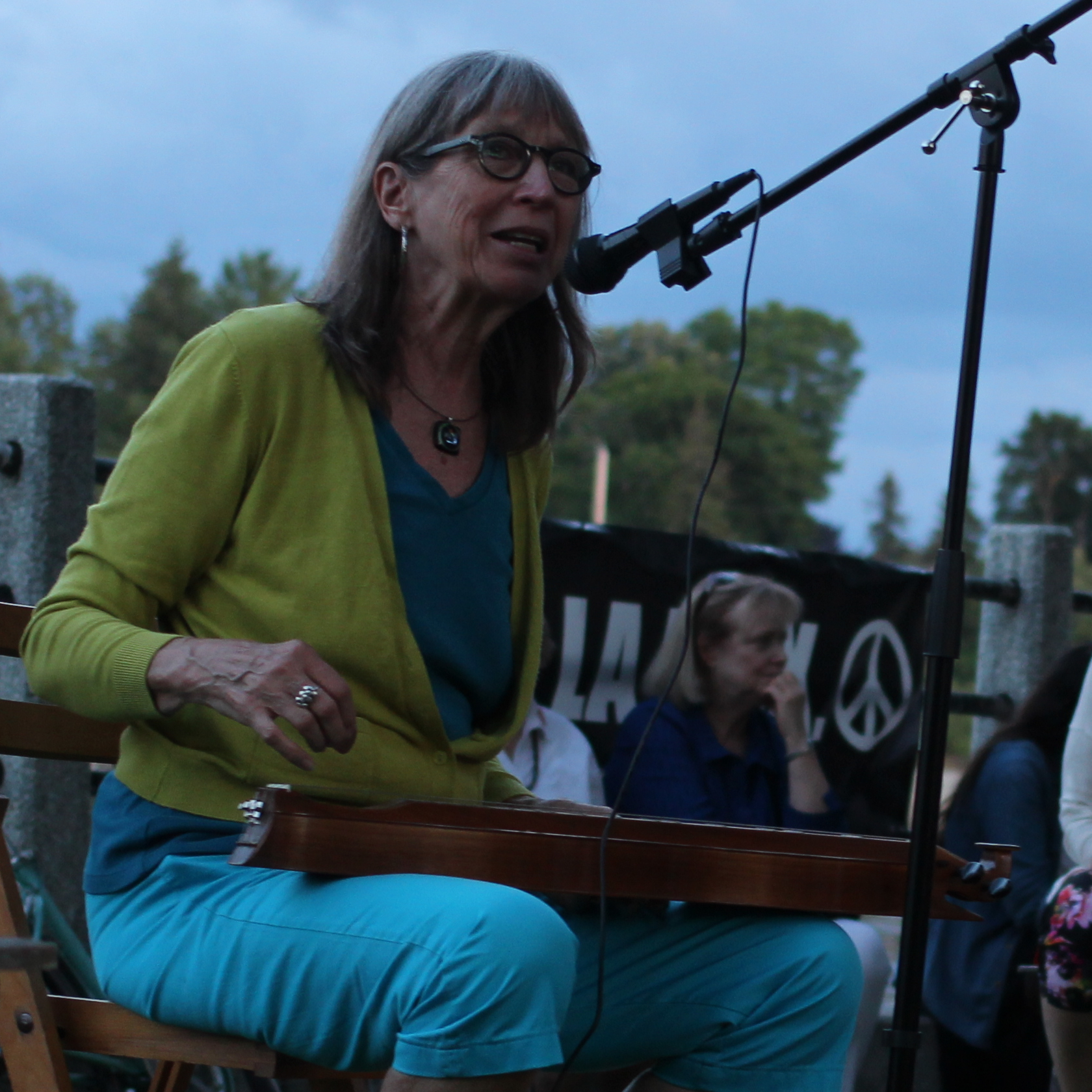
- Born: June 5, 1945
- Died: February 11, 2022 (aged 76)
- Education: Radcliffe College (BA)
- Occupations: Writer; performer; poet; religious educator
- Spouse: David Parry
- Children: Evalyn Parry, Richard Reed Parry

Caroline Balderston Parry (1945 – February 11, 2022) was a Canadian writer, musician, performer, celebrator, and consultant. She was the author of Zoomerang a Boomerang, Let's Celebrate Canada's Special Days, which won a 1987–88 Toronto IODE Book Award, and Eleanora's Diary, based on the 1830s diary of a Canadian immigrant girl, Eleanora Hallen. Caroline wrote, The Heron Spirals, A Commonplace Book, reflecting on 15 years after the death of her husband David Parry. Caroline was a member of the Writers' Union of Canada.

Caroline shared her love of language through haiku, such as her Speaking truth and poems like Goshen Friends Meeting.

She was a Quaker and wrote for a number of Quaker publications. She was also a Unitarian and a professional religious educator. She was the Director of Religious Education for the Unitarian Church of Montreal in Westmount/NDG. In this role in 2013 she wrote \Befriending the "I Don't Know" Place]\ that starts with a quote from eco-philosopher Joanna Macy. In 2013, Caroline presented the annual Sunderland P. Gardner Lecture at Canadian Yearly Meeting on the subject of 'The I Don't Know Place'.

Parry was married to David Parry, a singer, actor and director, and member of the folk group Friends of Fiddler's Green until his death. Her son Richard Parry leads the group Bell Orchestre and is the bassist for the rock band Arcade Fire, and her daughter Evalyn Parry is an actress, director, and prominent spoken-word performer and musician. Caroline and her dulcimer were active in Ottawa's folk community.

The Parry Family were featured on CKCU's Canadian Spaces on April 11, 2020, with Chris White along with, Stephen Fearing, and Catriona Sturton.

Caroline died on February 11, 2022, as shared in a Facebook post by her son Richard two days later. Arcade Fire dedicated their video for "The Lightning I, II" to Caroline.
