= Sandy Paton =

American folksinger and record executive (1929–2009)

Charles Alexander "Sandy" Paton (22 January 1929 — 26 July 2009) was a folksinger and folksong collector, a recording engineer, and a record label executive. As a performer, Paton was hailed by critic John Greenway as "the best interpreter of traditional singing in the English-speaking world, with the possible but not probable exception of Ewan MacColl." As a song-collector and field-recorder, Paton recorded folk singers in both the US and the UK, including Jeannie Robertson (assisting Hamish Henderson, a noted Scots folklorist), Jean Redpath, Horton Barker, and Frank Proffitt, whose song "Tom Dooley" later became a million-selling record by the Kingston Trio. Paton believed that modern high fidelity recording technology offered listeners the chance to experience the "richness" and "musicality" of folk music performances in a way that earlier, less-sophisticated recording technologies did not.

With his wife Caroline Paton and friends Lee and Mary Haggerty, Paton founded Folk-Legacy Records, a premier folk music recording label. One of his obituaries notes Paton's wide-ranging work on the label's releases, including not only in production and engineering but also in photography. Sandy and Caroline Paton also wrote liner notes for many of their label's recordings, contributing "a wealth of cultural knowledge" to the printed materials accompanying these albums.

Sandy and Caroline Paton appeared three times on the Studs Terkel radio show on WFMT. Recordings of these programs are in the Studs Terkel Radio Archive.

For their accomplishments in performing, recording, and preserving folk music, in 1993 Sandy and Caroline were named "official State Troubadours" by the Connecticut Commission on the Arts. They also received awards from the California Traditional Music Society as well as folk festivals in Tennessee and Massachusetts.

Sandy Paton was born in Florida, USA on 22 January 1929, and died in Sharon, Connecticut USA on 26 July 2009.
