= Larrivée =

Larrivée or Larrivee is a French surname. Notable people with the surname include:

- Christian Larrivée (born 1982), Canadian ice hockey player
- Gaby Larrivée (born 1933), Québécois-Canadian politician
- Henri Larrivée (1737–1802), French opera singer
- Jean Larrivée (born 1944), Canadian luthier; founder of Jean Larrivée Guitars Ltd.
- Leo Larrivee (1903–1928) U.S. Olympian track and field athlete
- Ricardo Larrivée (born 1967), Québécois-Canadian television chef
- Wayne Larrivee (born ?), U.S. sports broadcaster
