= David Parry (folk musician) =

David Parry (18 June 1942 – 13 June 1995) was a Canadian folk musician, storyteller, actor, stage director, and teacher. He was an important presence in the Canadian folk music scene from the mid-1970s up until his death in 1995. He worked both as a solo artist and as a member of the Friends of Fiddler's Green, a ceilidh band based in Toronto, Ontario, Canada. He was married to writer and musician Caroline Balderston Parry. Their son Richard Reed Parry (born 1977) is a member of the rock band Arcade Fire and their daughter Evalyn Parry is a prominent spoken-word performer and musician.

Born in London, England, Parry received his formal training in theater, ultimately earning a Ph.D. in historical drama. He began his career as a stage actor in England during the early 1960s. He soon moved into directing plays as well and also began working as a semi-professional musician. During the 1960s and early 1970s he acted in and directed plays in England, Europe, India, and North America.

In the mid-1970s, Parry moved with his wife to Toronto, where he began playing solo dates as a singer and storyteller. He soon became a fixture on Toronto's folk scene. He became a member of the Toronto Morris Men and then later joined the Friends of Fiddler's Green in the early 1980s. He also occasionally performed in concerts with Ian Robb. Parry released two solo albums: Wind That Tramps the World (1985) and The Man From Eldorado: Songs and Stories of Robert W. Service (1993). He was also heavily featured on the Friends of Fiddler's Green albums This Side of the Ocean (1981) and Road to Mandalay (1994). A posthumous album E Liked It All! (1995) was released when Parry died of a sudden heart attack at the age of 52.

In addition to his work as a musician, Parry was on the staff of the Canadian Museum of Civilization where he was the director of the live interpretation program. He was also an adjunct faculty member of the drama department at the University of Toronto where he led Poculi Ludique Societas, a medieval drama group.

== Discography ==
- The Wind That Tramps the World: Songs and Stories from Canada and the Old Country (1985)
- The Man From Eldorado: Songs And Stories Of Robert W. Service (1993)

=== With Friends of Fiddler's Green ===
- This Side Of The Ocean (1981)
- The Road To Mandalay (1994)
- 'E Liked it All!: David Parry In Concert With The Friends Of Fiddler's Green (2019)
