= Middletown Folk Festival =

American folk festival

The Middletown, New Jersey, Folk Festival, which ran from 1968 to 1984, was a folk music and crafts event which attempted to show to local audiences the variety and breadth of American folk music. It was conceived and produced by Marlene and Dick Levine, who after attending the Newport Folk Festival in Rhode Island and the Fox Hollow Folk Festival in Petersburgh, New York, wanted to have a festival in their own community using local facilities.

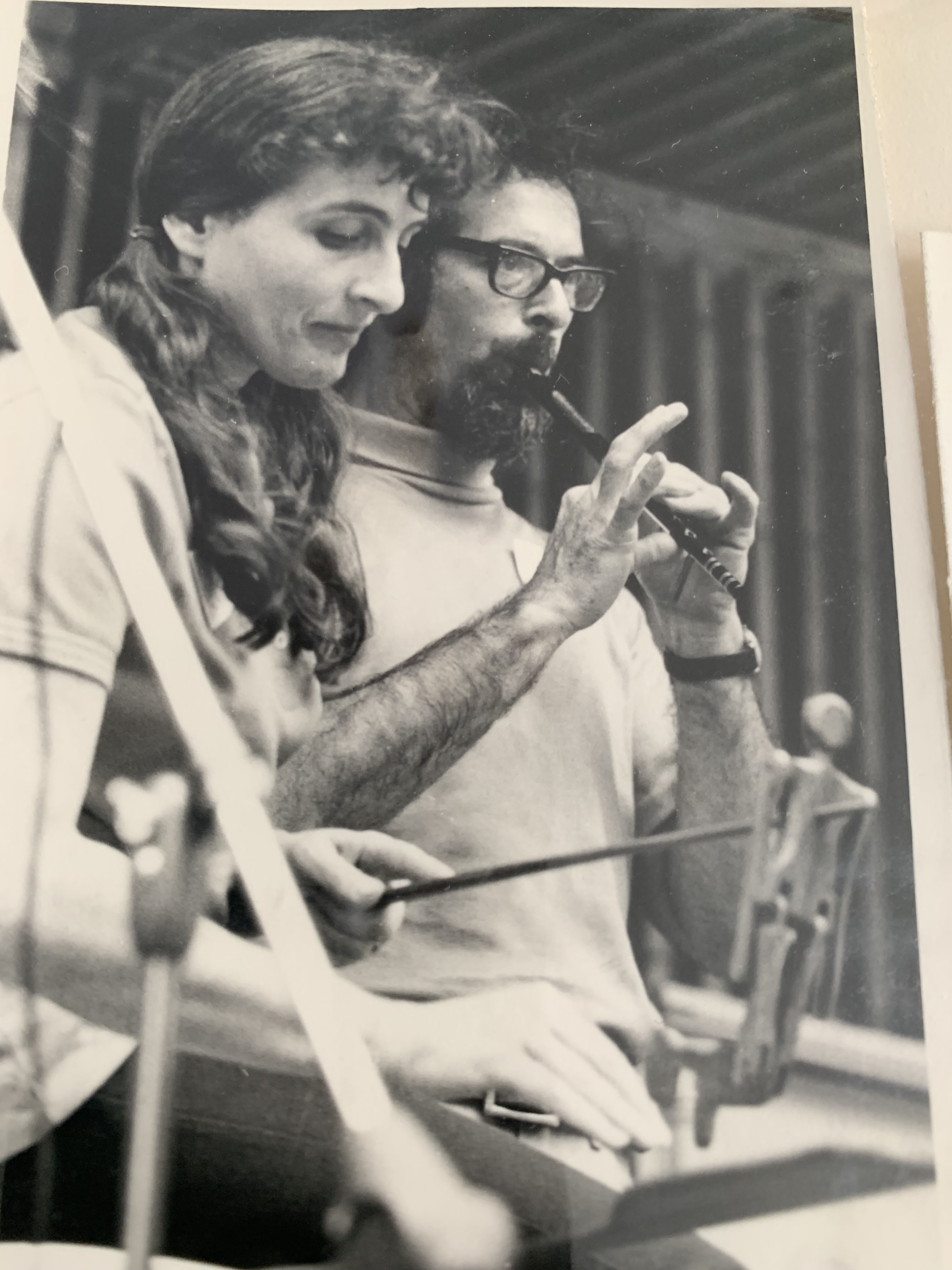

Marlene and Richard met in college where together, they became interested in the Folk Revival of the 1950s. After Marlene graduated and Richard completed dental school, they settled in Hazlet, NJ, where Richard opened his practice and where they would raise their family. During this time, the two often traveled to Greenwich Village in NYC where they frequented the folk club of Israel Young, seeing such performers as Bob Dylan, Peter, Paul and Mary and Pete Seeger. Soon, Richard and Marlene started performing themselves, Richard on guitar, concertina and a variety of other instruments and Marlene the autoharp.

Eventually, they met two other couples who were playing folk music and starting in 1962, they gathered monthly to share songs. They called these gatherings hootnannies and was their first change to realize that music was more than performing, but rather a chance to come together with others in community. In time, the Levines began attending folk festivals; initially Newport and then Fox Hollow. In 1967, they determined to bring their love of folk music and community to the community where they lived (which was now Middletown, NJ), and they made plans for a folk concert which was held in June, 1967. They called it the $.99 Hootnanny.

Response to the concert was so positive that beginning in 1968, they produced the Middletown Folk Festival. The festival consisted of a series of folk music concerts, workshops, a children's activity area and numerous crafts exhibits. In the first year 700 people attended. The Middletown Recreation Department provided support and services including the use of a municipal park with a mobile stage with the local Kiwanis and Junior Woman's club organizations handling the food concession.

The festival was a community event with a true community flavor and family appeal with most of the attendees from the local area, with over 33,000 attending over the 17-year period in which the festival took place.

This excerpt from the 1969 festival program (June 28, 1969) articulates the mission of the festival:

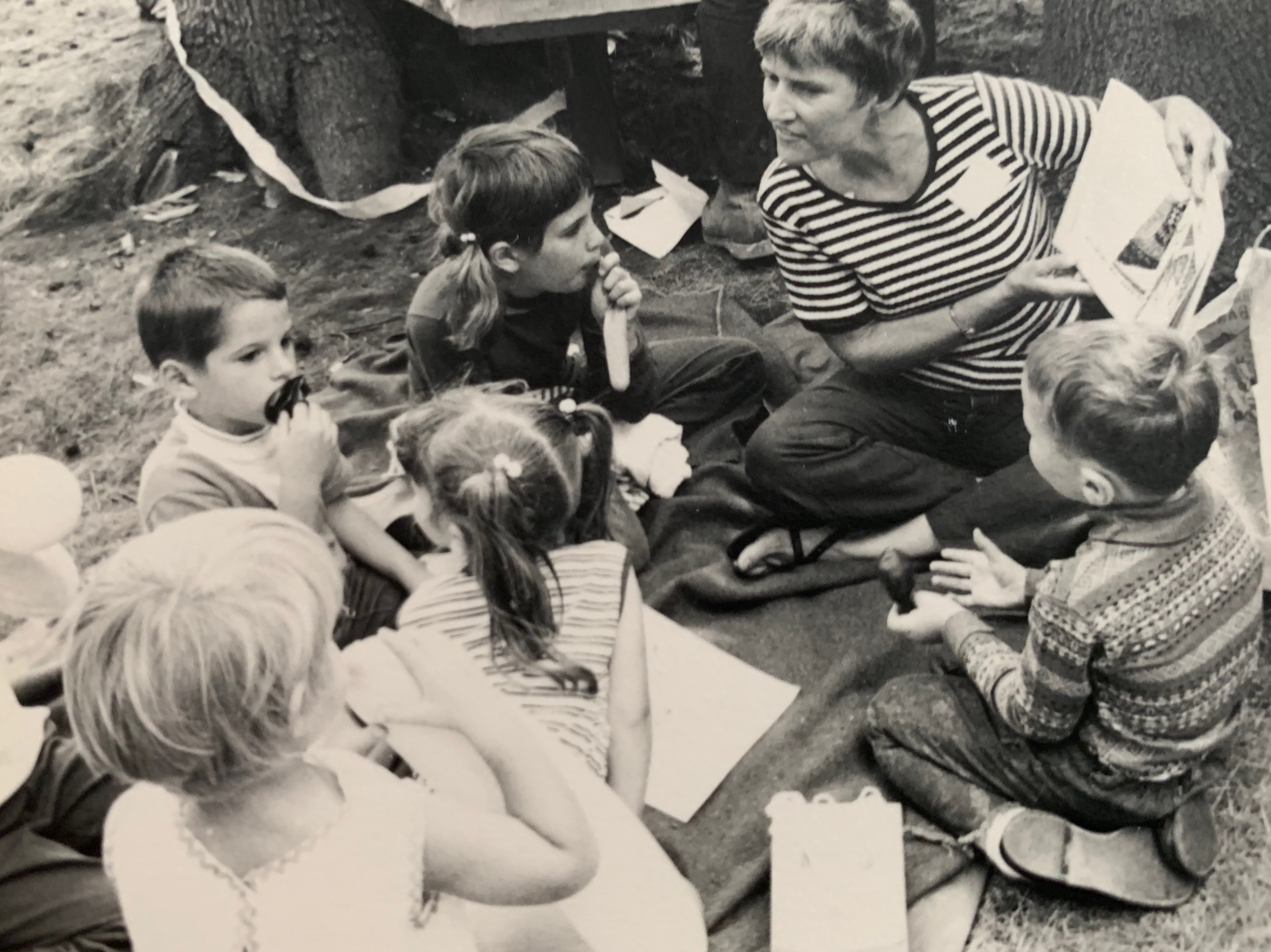

"What we are trying to do here today is to show you some of the tremendously varied kinds of folk music that people play for their own enjoyment right here in the Middletown area. You will be hearing everything from traditional ballads to Irish fiddling, from bagpipes to bluegrass, from Nashville country music to blues and gospel, and European lute to Indian sitar. During the afternoon you will have the opportunity of examining crafts as exhibited by local craftsmen. Among the displays will be one on dulcimer making, one on the construction of the "clogging man", as well as marionette making, quilting, rug braiding and special children's crafts. In short, our emphasis is on people doing things themselves, providing their own entertainment rather than sitting back and having someone else provide it for them. We hope more and more of you will realize that what we do ourselves is the most fun of all, and surely the most fulfilling."

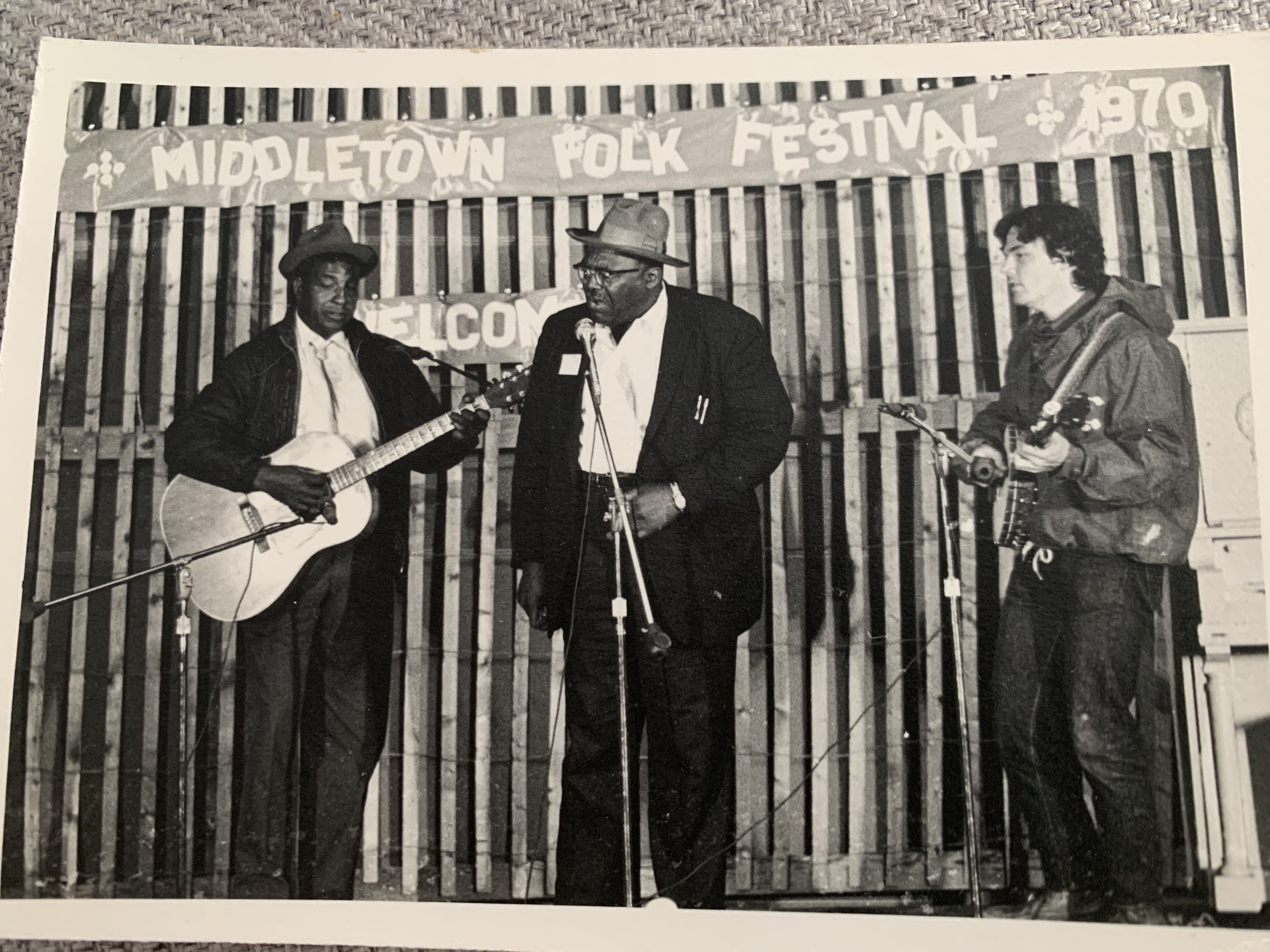

In spite of the Levine's intention to create a small, community celebratory event, the community spirit was felt not only by the attendees but by the performers as well. Through the years, some of the nationally known folk and traditional music performers of the time included: Michael Cooney, Highwoods String Band, Utah Phillips, Barbara Carnes, Helen Schneyer, Jay Ungar, Molly Mason, and Lyn Hardy, and Mike and Alice Seeger.

The Middletown Folk Festival ran from 1968 to 1984. As the local support for the event dwindled, Richard and Marlene felt that the time had come for the event to end. It seemed like the natural ending point and it wasn't so much sad that the festival stopped but it was more a celebration of good work done for the betterment of the community and for the world of folk music as well.

The festival attracted media interest and had been televised on New Jersey Public Broadcasting and the National Educational Network. (1972-1973). Two recordings, produced in the earliest years, have been contributed to the Archive of Folksong at the Library of Congress and local libraries.
