= Michael Cooney =

Michael Cooney may refer to:

- Michael Cooney (musician), American folk and blues musician
- Michael Cooney (screenwriter), British screenwriter, playwright, and director
- Mike Cooney, American politician
