= Richard Flohil =

Canadian music promoter and publicist (born 1934)

- Born: 24 June 1934 (age 92); Selby, Yorkshire, England
- Occupations: Music promoter; publicist; writer; editor; music manager; music festival
- Years active: 1950–present
- Known for: Mariposa Folk Festival
- Website: Richard Flohil

Richard Flohil (born 24 June 1934) is a Canadian music promoter, publicist, former Mariposa Folk Festival artistic director and journalist based in Toronto. In 2024, Flohil officially retired from his public relations company, Richard Flohil and Associates.

== Publicity ==
Richard Flohil has been involved in the Canadian music industry for 60 years primarily as a publicist working with artists, usually in the early stages of their career. These have included k.d. lang, Shakura S’Aida, Good Lovelies, Moscow Apartment, Jadea Kelly, The Jerry Cans, Loreena McKennitt, Jenie Thai, Serena Ryder, T. Nile Ariana Gillis, Alejandra Ribera, and Ani DiFranco.

Other clients have included Ian Tyson, Long John Baldry, Prairie Oyster, Crash Test Dummies. He has handled Toronto "celebrity" publicity for Sir George Martin, Eric Idle, Alice Cooper, Billy Connolly, and Chuck D.

== Concert Promotion ==
As a concert promoter Flohil has promoted a wide variety of artists in many different Toronto venues. He presented the first Canadian appearances of Muddy Waters, B. B. King and Bobby Bland, Buddy Guy and The Chieftains.

Other artists he has presented in concert include Miles Davis, Stephane Grappelli, Benny Goodman, Chuck Berry, John Prine, Steve Goodman, Ry Cooder, Long John Baldry, Maynard Ferguson, Leon Redbone, Honeyboy Edwards, Jeff Healey, and Ian Tyson.

== Management ==
Flohil co-managed Downchild Blues Band for several decades. He notes that as a publicist, he has frequently acted as manager and agent, especially for new artists.

== Journalism ==
Flohil began his career as an apprentice trainee reporter on the Evening Press in York, England. Later Flohil worked on The Bradford Telegraph and Argus before becoming chief reporter of The Selby Gazette and Herald. Moving to Canada in 1957, he edited trade magazines, and freelanced for Canadian High News. He edited The Canadian Composer from 1970 to 1993, co-founded the weekly trade magazine The Record. Flohil now writes for FYI Music News, Roots Music Canada, and The Sound Cafe.

== Folk festivals ==
In addition to his involvement with the Mariposa Music Festival as programming director, Richard Flohil is a regular workshop host and MC at festivals in Canada, such as the Mariposa Folk Festival, Edmonton Folk Festival, the Calgary Folk Music Festival, the Winnipeg Folk Festival, and the Hillside Festival.

== Substack ==
Since 2023, Flohil publishes a weekly newsletter called Stories From the Edge of Music where he shares anecdotes and encounters with blues, jazz, folk, country, and pop musicians, industry trailblazers, historical events, music festivals, and iconic venues in Canada, the United States, Europe, and Australia. For over 40 years, Flohil has been attending between 100 and 300 live shows a year.

== Awards and nominations ==
1990: Special Achievement Award, Casby Music Award

1999: Golden Porcupine For Lifetime Achievement Award

2005: Blues Booster Award, Toronto Blues Society

2006: Estelle Klein Award, Folk Music Ontario

2009: Special Achievement Award, SOCAN

2010: Spirit of Folk Award, Folk Alliance International

2010: Keeping the Blues Alive Publicist of the Year Award, Blues Foundation, Memphis, Tennessee

2016: Unsung Hero Award, Canadian Independent Music Association

2017 : Hall of Fame, Mariposa Folk Festival
