= Peter Kiesewalter =

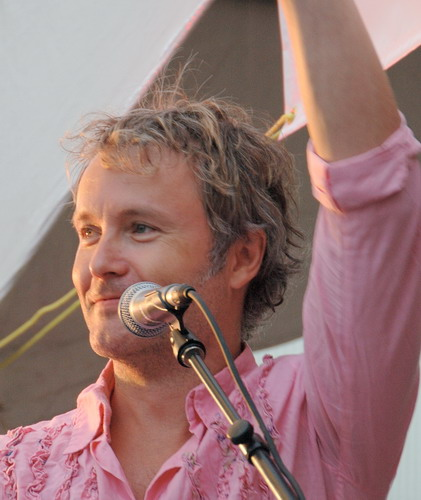
- Kiesewalter at the Ottawa Chamber Music Festival 2006
- Born: Ottawa, Ontario, Canada
- Citizenship: Canadian
- Occupation: multi-instrumentalist
- Musical career
- Genres: folk-rock, jazz, classical
- Instruments: saxophone, clarinet, keyboards, accordion
- Years active: 1980s–present

Peter Kiesewalter is a Canadian arranger and multi-instrumentalist who plays sax, clarinet, keyboard, and accordion.

== Career ==
In the 1990s, Kiesewalter was a member of the Ottawa-based bands Fat Man Waving and The Angstones, both diverse bands that blended folk, jazz and pop music influences. He played piano, keyboards, accordion and clarinet with Fat Man Waving, and reeds and accordion with the Angstones. His bandmates in the two bands included Rebecca Campbell (vocals), Fred Guignon (guitar), Ian Mackie (drums and percussion) and James Stephens (bass) in Fat Man Waving, and Mackie, Kurt Walther (guitar), Rob Frayne (saxophone) and John Geggie (bass) in the Angstones.

Kiesewalter was a member of the East Village Opera Company (EVOC) from 2004 to 2010, a rock group co-founded by vocalist Tyley Ross and Kiesewalter. AnnMarie Milazzo provided vocals. EVOC included eight other members: two guitarists, a bassist, a percussionist and a string quartet. EVOC's repertoire included primarily operatic and classical pieces that Kiesewalter arranged in rock and other popular music styles. Kiesewalter next formed Brooklyn Rundfunk Orkestrata (BRO) to cover songs from The Sound of Music with the Rodgers and Hammerstein Organization.

Kiesewalter is music director for Jane Siberry. From 2014 to 2019, Kiesewalter was also the music director and conductor for concerts by Jackie Evancho.
