= Art Thieme =

American singer-songwriter

- Born: July 9, 1941; Chicago, Illinois, USA
- Died: May 26, 2015 (aged 73)
- Genres: Folk
- Occupation: folksinger
- Instruments: Guitar, banjo, saw
- Years active: 1960s – 1990s

Arthur Thieme (July 9, 1941 – May 26, 2015) was an American folk musician. He specialized in traditional songs and stories from the Upper Midwest, though he collected and performed cowboy songs from the West as well.

He was assistant manager of the Old Town Folklore Center in Chicago - 1964-1965 & 1966 (retail outlet for the Old Town School of Folk Music), ran The Folk Art Shop in Depoe Bay, Oregon with his wife Carol in 1967 and 1968, sang all over the country for many years -including 37 years singing at the No Exit Cafe & Gallery in Chicago. He played in schools in the 6 counties in and around Chicago through the Urban Gateways arts & education agency for 22 years, was a host of National Public Radio's "Flea Market" radio show broadcast live from the Old Town School of Folk Music every Sunday afternoon in the mid-1980s, sang and told tales for about a decade on the steamboat Julia Belle Swain and the diesel boat Twilight on the Mississippi and Illinois Rivers. A photographer pre 1960 through part of the 2000s (decade), Art has made his photos available to the public on the Mudcat internet site.

== Discography ==
- Outright Bold-Faced Lies, 1977 Kicking Mule Records
- Songs Of The Heartland, 1980 Kicking Mule Records
- That's The Ticket, 1983 Folk-Legacy Records
- On the Wilderness Road, 1986 Folk-Legacy Records
- On The River, 1988 Folk-Legacy Records
- The Older I Get, The Better I Was, 1998 Waterbug Records
- Art Thieme LIVE: Chicago Town & Points West, 2006 Folk-Legacy Records
