= Chelsea Bridge (quartet) =

Canadian jazz quartet

- Origin: Ottawa, Ontario, Canada
- Genres: Jazz, Post-bop
- Years active: 1992-1997
- Label: Unity Records
- Past members: Rob Frayne; John Geggie; Jean Martin; Clyde Forsberg; Tena Palmer

Chelsea Bridge was a Canadian jazz quartet based in Ottawa, Ontario. Its members were Rob Frayne on tenor and soprano saxophone, bassist John Geggie, drummer Jean Martin, trumpet player Clyde Forsberg, and singer Tena Palmer. The band was highly-regarded, with critics calling it 'cutting-edge' and 'ground-breaking'. In a Centretown News online article, a reviewer called the group "one of Ottawa's most prestigious jazz groups."

== Career ==
The group played, for the most part, songs written by Frayne, Geggie, and Palmer.

They toured extensively, conducting four Canadian tours and playing New York's Blue Note Jazz Club, Moldejazz (the Molde International Jazz Festival) in Norway, the Washington DC Jazz Festival, the Guelph Jazz Festival, the Montreal International Jazz Festival, the Vancouver International Jazz Festival and the Newport Jazz Festival.

In 1997, Chelsea Bridge was the subject of a "Jazzumentary" by Douglas Von Rosen called Chelsea Bridge.

== Discography ==
- Blues in a Sharp Sea (Post-bop, 1992), Unity Records
- Tatamagouche...Next Left (Avant-Garde Jazz, 1994), Unity Records
- Double Feature (Avant-Garde Jazz, 1995), Unity Records
- Chelsea Bridge (2002)
