= Larrivée (guitar company) =

Canadian guitar manufacturer

Jean Larrivée Guitars Inc.
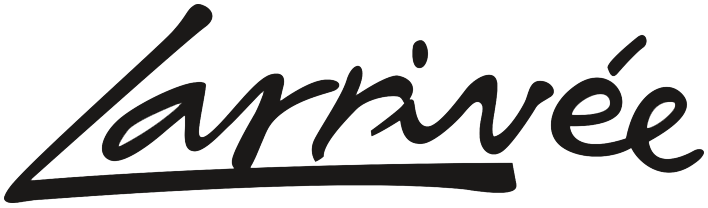
- Type: Private
- Industry: Musical instrument
- Founded: 1967; 59 years ago in Toronto
- Founder: Jean Larrivée
- Headquarters: California, U.S.
- Products: Electric and acoustic guitars
- Website: larrivee.com

Jean Larrivée Guitars Inc. is a Canadian company that manufactures electric and acoustic guitars. Founded in 1967 by Jean Larrivée, the company moved from Toronto, Ontario, to Victoria, British Columbia, in 1977, and to Vancouver in 1982. A second plant opened in California in September 2001. Canadian manufacturing was closed in 2013.

== History ==
Jean Larrivée began a guitar-building apprenticeship with Edgar Moench Sr. in Toronto, Canada, and built his first two Larrivée-style guitars. The first Larrivée guitars were based on European classical guitar designs and became part of the Larrivée family collection.

The company was founded in Toronto, Ontario, in 1967 and moved to Victoria, British Columbia, in 1977, and to Vancouver in 1982. In September 2001, Larrivée opened a second plant in California. However, in November 2013 Larrivée announced that it would be consolidating its Canadian division and closing its Vancouver factory.

In 1971 Larrivee began adding inlay designs to their guitars, and in 1977 inlays became a standard for their guitars. Beginning in 1978 their inlay designs took on a more romantic style. Since 1979 all engravings have been designed by Wendy Larrivée except for a 1998 inlay called "The Joker". In 2007 Larrivée began using laser engraving for their inlays.

The astronaut Chris Hadfield performed a cover of David Bowie's "Space Oddity" on a Larrivée parlor guitar while in orbit on the International Space Station.

== Models ==
Details of a Larrivée guitar headstock

- 03 Recording Series
- 40 Legacy Series
- 04 Performer Series
- 05 Mahogany Select Series
- 09 Rosewood Artist Series
- 10 Rosewood Deluxe Series
- 11 Fingerstyle Series
- 50 Mahogany Traditional Series
- 60 Rosewood Traditional Series
- 30 Series classical guitars

=== Body Styles ===
- P - Parlor
- PV - Venetian cutaway parlor
- OM - Orchestra model
- OMV - Venetian cutaway OM
- LS -Larrivée small body
- LSV - Venetian cutaway small body
- L - Larrivée body
- LV - Venetian cutaway L-body
- C - Florentine cutaway (L - body)
- D - Dreadnought
- DV - Venetian dreadnought
- J - Jumbo
- JV - Venetian jumbo
- LJ - Larrivée jumbo
- LJV - Venetian LJ
- 0 - Single "O"
- 00 - Double "O"
- 000 - Triple "O"
- SO - Slope OM - same as 000
- SD - Slope dreadnought

The 03 Recording Series features all wood construction without the inlays and high gloss finishes. All models are now produced in the California facility.

== Model history ==
=== All models ===
(in numerical order): 01, 02, 03, 04, 05, 07, 09, 10, 11, 19, 20, 27, 28, 30, 31, 35, 38, 40, 41, 42, 45, 48, 50, 60, 70, 72, 78

=== Description ===
- 01, 02, 03, 04 = all satin models with 04 having gloss tops
- 05 = glossy mahogany
- 07, 09, 11 = glossy rosewood.
- 19 = glossy rosewood- marquetry rosette, headstock inlay.
- 27 = same as 19 but florentine cutaway version (L27 was the previous name of what became C-19)
- 10 = glossy rosewood, top abalone purfling- often headstock inlay.
- 20 = koa guitar with eagle inlay and feather fingerboard and bridge wing inlays.
- 28 = 10 series florentine cutaway version. L28 was previous model number of C-10.
- 30 = nylon string classic in both L body and C cutaway
- 31, 35 = nylon string classic
- 38 = nylon string cutaway
- 40 = Legacy Series featuring asymmetrical bracing
- 41 = 12 string "19" version
- 42 = 12 string "10" version
- 45 = 12 string "10" version, florentine cutaway
- 48 = 12 presentation model.
- 50 = Traditional Series mahogany
- 60 = Traditional Series rosewood
- 70 = large sound hole "19" style
- 72 = presentation model.
- 78 = florentine cutaway version of "72"
