= Folk-Legacy Records =

Sandy and Caroline Paton

Folk-Legacy Records was an independent record label specializing in traditional and contemporary folk music of the English-speaking world. It was founded in 1961 by Sandy and Caroline Paton and Lee Baker Haggerty.

The label recorded Frank Proffitt and released a memorial album after his death. Folk-Legacy has produced more than 120 recordings. Recording and cover photographs were done by Sandy Paton while Haggerty was the business manager. Sandy and Caroline were singers in their own right, having been designated the Connecticut State Troubadours for 1993–1994. They lived in Sharon, Connecticut until Sandy's death in 2009. Caroline died in 2019.

In 2019, the label's collection was transferred to Smithsonian Folkways.

== Master list / discography ==
Master list / discography
FL No.	Year	Artist	Title
1	1962	Frank Proffitt	Frank Proffitt, Reese, North Carolina
2	1962	Joseph Able Trivett	Joseph Able Trivett, Butler, Tennessee
3	1962	Edna Ritchie	Edna Ritchie, Viper, Kentucky
4	1962	Fleming Brown	Fleming Brown
5	1963	Howie Mitchell	Howie Mitchell
6	1962	Richard Chase	Richard Chase tells three "Jack" Tales
7	1963	Paddy Tunney	The Man of Songs
8	1963	Peg Clancy Power	Down By the Glenside
9	1962	Marie Hare	Marie Hare, Strathadam, New Brunswick, Canada
10	1963	Tom Brandon	The Rambling Irishman
11	1963	Max Hunter	Ozark Songs and Ballads
12	1963	Eugene Rhodes	Talkin' About My Time
13	1963	Hank Ferguson	Behind These Walls
14	1964	Ray Hicks	Ray Hicks Telling Four Traditional "Jack Tales"
15	1964	Lawrence Older	Lawrence Older, Middle Grove, NY
16	1964	Golden Ring	Golden Ring: A Gathering of Friends for Making Music
17	1964	Hobart Smith	Hobart Smith, Saltville, Virginia
18	1964	Arnold Keith Storm	Take the News to Mother
19	1964	Bob and Ron Copper	English Shepherd and Farming Songs
20	1965	Harry Cox	Traditional English Love Songs
21	1965	Bill Meek	Traditional and Original Songs of Ireland
22	1964	Beech Mountain	The Traditional Music of Beech Mountain, NC, Volume 1
23	1965	Beech Mountain	The Traditional Music of Beech Mountain, NC, Volume 2
24	1965	Dock/DrakeWalsh, Garley Foster	The Carolina Tar Heels
25	1964	Hector Lee	The Folklore of the Mormon Country
26	1965	Sarah Ogan Gunning	Girl of Constant Sorrow
27	1965	Grant Rogers	Songmaker of the Catskills
28	1966	Sandy and Jeanie Darlington	Songs and Ballads
29	1965	Howie Mitchell	The Mountain Dulcimer, How to Make It and Play It
30	1966	Sandy and Caroline Paton	Sandy and Caroline Paton
31	1967	Rosalie Sorrels	If I Could Be the Rain
32	1968	Hedy West	Old Times and Hard Times
33	1968	Sarah Cleveland	Ballads and Songs of the Upper Hudson Valley
34	1968	Norman Kennedy	Ballads and Songs of Scotland
35	1968	Michael Cooney	The Cheese Stands Alone
36	1968	Frank Proffitt	Memorial Album
37	1970	Tony and Irene Saletan	Folk Songs and Ballads
38	1970	Sara Grey	Sara Grey with Ed Trickett
39	1971	Joe Hickerson	Joe Hickerson with a Gathering of Friends
40	1970	Gordon Bok	A Tune for November
41	1971	New Golden Ring	Five Days Singing, Volume 1
42	1971	New Golden Ring	Five Days Singing, Volume 2
43	1976	Howie Mitchell	The Hammered Dulcimer, How to Make It and Play It
44	1972	Gordon Bok	Peter Kagan and the Wind
45	1972	John Wilcox	Stages of My Life
46	1972	Ed Trickett	The Telling Takes Me Home
47	1972	Jim Ringer	Waitin' for the Hard Times to Go
48	1972	Gordon Bok	Seal Djirl's Hymn
49	1973	Jean Redpath	Frae My Ain Countrie
50	1974	Helen Schneyer	Ballads, Broadsides and Hymns
51	1974	Bob Zentz	Mirrors and Changes
52	1975	Sandy and Caroline Paton	I've Got a Song
53	1975	Betty Smith	Songs Traditionally Sung in North Carolina
54	1975	Gordon Bok	Bay of Fundy
55	1975	Rick and Lorraine Lee	Living in the Trees
56	1975	Bok, Muir, Trickett	Turning Toward the Morning
57	1976	Kendall Morse	Lights Along the Shore
58	1976	Joe Hickerson	Drive Dull Care Away, Volume 1
59	1976	Joe Hickerson Drive	Drive Dull Care Away, Volume 2
60	1976	Joan Sprung	Ballads and Butterflies
61	1976	Archie Fisher	The Man With a Rhyme
62	1976	Margaret Christie and Ian Robb	The Barley Grain for Me
63	1976	Harry Tuft	Across the Blue Mountains
64	1977	Ed Trickett	Gently Down the Stream of Time
65	1977	John Roberts and Tony Barrand	Dark Ships in the Forest, Ballads of the Supernatural
66	1977	Bill Staines	Just Play One Tune More
67	1978	Bob Zentz	Beaucatcher Farewell
68	1978	Bok, Muir, Trickett	The Ways of Man
69	1978	Cilla Fisher and Artie Trezise	For Foul Day and Fair
70	1979	Bill Staines	The Whistle of the Jay
71	1979	Ian Robb	Ian Robb and Hang the Piper
72	1979	Gordon Bok	Another Land Made of Water
73	1980	Joan Sprung	Pictures to My Mind
74	1980	Howard Bursen	Cider in the Kitchen
75	1981	Various Artists	The Continuing Tradition Sampler, Volume 1: Ballads
76	1981	Ron Kane and Skip Gorman	Powder River
77	1980	Jerry Rasmussen	Get Down Home
78	1980	Seamus and Manus McGuire	Humours of Lissadell
79	1980	Kendall Morse	Seagulls and Summer People
80	1980	Bok, Muir, Trickett	A Water Over Stone
81			
82	1981	Jonathan Eberhart	Life's Trolley Ride
83	1981	Cindy Kallet	Working on Wings to Fly
84	1981	Gordon Bok	Jeremy Brown and Jeannie Teal
85	1981	Helen Bonchek Schneyer	On the Hallelujah Line
86	1982	Amidon, Simpson, Rock Creek	Sharon Mountain Harmony: A Golden Ring of Gospel
87	1983	Paul Van Arsdale	Dulcimer Heritage
88	1985	Lorre Wyatt	Roots and Branches
89			
90	1983	Art Thieme	That's the Ticket
91	1982	Ray Fisher	Willie's Lady
92	1982	Ed Trickett	People Like You
93	1983	Cliff Haslam	The Clockwinder
94	1983	Gordon Bok	A Rogue's Gallery of Songs for 12-String
95	1983	Skip Gorman	New Englander's Choice
96	1983	Bok, Muir, Trickett	All Shall Be Well Again
97	1983	Boarding Party	Tis Our Sailing Time
98	1983	Cindy Kallet	Cindy Kallet 2
99	1985	Ann Mayo Muir	So Goes My Heart
100	1987	Sandy and Caroline Paton	New Harmony
101	1985	Jerry Rasmussen	The Secret Life of Jerry Rasmussen
102			
103	1987	Skip Gorman	Trail to Mexico
104	1985	Bok, Muir, Trickett	Fashioned in the Clay
105	1986	Art Thieme	On the Wilderness Road
106	1985	Ian Robb	Rose and Crown
107	1986	Cathy Barton and Dave Para	On a Day Like Today
108			
109	1987	Boarding Party	Fair Winds and a Following Sea
110	1987	Bok, Muir, Trickett	Minneapolis Concert
111			
112	1989	Gordon Bok, et al	Ensemble
113			
114	1989	Barton, Para, Paton	Twas On a Night Like This: A Christmas Legacy
115	1989	Ed Miller	Border Background
116	1990	Bok, Muir, Trickett	And So Will We Yet
117			
118	1990	Gordon Bok	Return to the Land
119			
120	1992	David Paton	Music From the Mountain
121	1992	Barton, Para, Trickett, Tuft, Paton	For All the Good People, A Golden Ring Reunion
122	1993	Larry Kaplan	Worth All the Telling
123	1995	Rick Fielding	Lifeline
124	1998	Dan Milner	Irish Ballads and Songs of the Sea
125	2000	Various Artists	Ballads and Songs of Tradition
126	1999	Carol Barney, John Sherman	Ceol Anam
127	1999	David Paton, et al	All Hands Around
128	2001	D. Cowan, A. Cargill, S. Brown	The Songs and Ballads of Hattie Mae Tyler Cargill
129	2001	Dan Milner and Bob Conroy	Irish in America
130	2001	Howie Bursen	Banjo Manikin
131	2003	Boarding Party	Too Far From the Shore
132	2003	Various Artists	Irish Songs From Old New England
133	2004	Johnson Girls	"On the Rocks"
134	2004	Poor Old Horse	The Curates Egg
135		Art Thieme	Chicago Town and Other Points West
136	2007	Bill Shute and Lisa Null	The Feathered Maiden and Other Ballads
137	2007	Bill Shute and Lisa Null	American Primitive
138		Johnson Girls	Fire Down Below
139	2010	Horizons	Bob Zentz
140	2010	Called Away	Chris Koldewey
1001	1983	Gordon Bok	Clear Away in the Morning
1002	1989	Sandy and Caroline Paton	When the Spirit Says Sing
1003	1992	Bok, Muir, Trickett	The First Fifteen Years, Volume 1
1004	1992	Bok, Muir, Trickett	The First Fifteen Years, Volume 2
1005	1995	Gordon Bok	North Wind's Clearing
1006	2000	Ann Mayo Muir	The Music of Ann Mayo Muir

== See also ==
- List of record labels
