= Isabel Gunn =

Scottish woman who worked for Hudson's Bay Company

- Born: August 1, 1781; Orkney Islands, Scotland
- Died: November 7, 1861 (aged 80); Orkney Islands
- Other names: Isabella Gunn (or Gun), John Fubbister, Mary Fubbister
- Occupations: HBC labourer, stocking and mitten maker
- Known for: First European women in western Canada

Isabel (or Isabella) Gunn (1 August 1781 – 7 November 1861), also known as John Fubbister or Mary Fubbister, was a Scottish labourer employed by the Hudson's Bay Company (HBC), noted for having passed herself off as a man, thereby becoming the first European woman to travel to Rupert's Land, now part of Western Canada. Gunn's ruse was not caught until 1807 when she gave birth to a baby boy while working for the HBC.

== Early life ==
Gunn was born in Orphir on the Orkney Islands off the north coast of Scotland, near the town of Kirkwall. She was the daughter of John Gunn and Girzal Allan Little is known of her early life until the summer of 1806, when, under the pseudonym John Fubbister, she entered into a contract with the HBC as a labourer for three years at £8 per year. Although her motivations for doing so are uncertain, tradition holds that she may have been following a lover who had cast her aside. Her brother George was also employed by the HBC, and it is also possible that she was enticed to join by his stories of adventure and the opportunity to earn an income. Other than the enticement of her brother's adventure stories, Gunn may have seen this as an opportunity to make an income. As someone whose face was marked by smallpox scars, her chances of marriage would have been low which would result in the need to provide for herself.

Modern commentators point out that the modest HBC salary was nevertheless more than Gunn could have earned as a woman in Orkney at that time. Official HBC policy forbade employment of European women, although First Nation women were employed as cooks and domestic servants in company outposts.

== Discovery and return to Scotland ==
In the Autumn of 1807 Gunn was assigned to a brigade tasked with provisioning more distant outposts, and travelled with them to Martin Falls and then on to the HBC outpost on the Red River at Pembina in modern North Dakota, a distance of more than 2,900 kilometres (1,800 mi) . Once again, Gunn worked unsuspectedly alongside the men. The pretence was maintained until the morning of 29 December 1807, when to general astonishment, Gunn gave birth to a baby boy at the home of Alexander Henry the younger, the chief of the North West Company's Pembina post, after having fallen ill and begging Alexander Henry for shelter. According to Henry's journal:

I returned to my room, where I had not been long before he sent one of my own people, requesting the favour of speaking with me. Accordingly, I stepped down to him, and was much surprised to find him extended out upon the hearth, uttering most dreadful lamentations; he stretched out his hand towards me and in a piteful tone of voice begg'd my assistance, and requested I would take pity upon a poor helpless abandoned wretch, who was not of the sex I had every reason to suppose. But was an unfortunate Orkney girl pregnant and actually in childbirth, in saying this she opened her jacket and display'd to my view a pair of beautiful round white breasts... In about an hour she was safely delivered of a fine boy, and that same day she was conveyed home in my cariole, where she soon recovered.

The father of the baby was reportedly John Scarth, an HBC employee who had been in frequent contact with Gunn during her postings in Rupert's Land. It is believed that Scarth sexually assaulted or seduced Gunn during one of their postings after finding out her gender and threatening to expose her ruse. After the birth, Gunn became known as Mary Fubbister, and in early 1808 was ordered to return to Albany, and upon her arrival was no longer allowed to work with the men, but rather offered work as a washerwoman; a job that would be more suitable for women. Against her wishes, Gunn and her child were returned to Scotland on the Prince of Wales, the same boat that had brought her to Rupert's Land three years earlier, on 20 September 1809. Gunn and Baby James would have been returning to a town that would have shunned the young family due to the sin of sex without the sanctity of marriage. There, she lived in poverty, working as a stocking and mitten maker until her death in 1861 at the age of 81.

== Legacy ==
Gunn's life has inspired an historical fiction novel entitled Isobel Gunn by Audrey Thomas, a documentary poem entitled The Ballad of Isabel Gunn by Stephen Scobie, and a documentary film entitled The Orkney Lad: The Story of Isabel Gunn and directed by Anne Wheeler. Canadian folk singer Eileen McGann also paid tribute with her ballad "Isabella Gunn".

== See also ==
- Marie-Anne Gaboury, the first woman of European descent to permanently settle in Rupert's Land.
