= Fat Man Waving =

Canadian musical group

- Origin: Ottawa, Ontario, Canada
- Genres: folk-rock
- Years active: 1987–1996
- Past members: Rebecca Campbell; Peter Kiesewalter; Fred Guignon; Ian Mackie; James Stephens

Fat Man Waving was a Canadian folk-rock band from Ottawa, Ontario, active from 1987 to 1996. The band had a diverse, unclassifiable style which drew on folk, rock, Celtic and jazz influences, which made them popular with music critics — in 1990, Musician named them one of the 12 best unsigned acts in the world — but left record labels unsure how to market them effectively.

The band's core members were Rebecca Campbell on vocals, Peter Kiesewalter on piano, keyboards, accordion and clarinet, Fred Guignon on guitars, James Stephens on bass guitar, fiddle, viola and banjo and Ian Mackie on drums and percussion. Many of the band members were also associated with other projects. Kiesewalter and Mackie were also members of The Angstones, Campbell toured and recorded as a backing vocalist for Jane Siberry and in the folk music vocal trio Three Sheets to the Wind, and Guignon was a member of the alternative rock band Mystic Zealots.

== History ==
The band released its debut album, Fat Man Waving, independently in 1989. They subsequently recorded several non-album singles, including "Sons & Lovers" and a cover of "Waiting for the Moon" for the Bruce Cockburn tribute album Kick at the Darkness. They were the only Canadian band named to the top 12 in Musician's Best Unsigned Bands contest in 1990, which was judged by Lou Reed, Robbie Robertson, Vernon Reid, Branford Marsalis and Lyle Lovett. They followed up with the album Parade in 1992. They won the award for Band of the Year at the Ottawa Rock 'n' Roll Music Awards in 1992, over Love Chain, Furnaceface, One 2 One and Crucial Moments.

The band received strong airplay support from CBC Radio, and frequently toured across Canada on the folk festival circuit.

They signed to Aquarius Records in 1995, and released The Habit of Gravity that year. However, their primary champion at the label, president Keith Brown, soon left the company and the band found themselves without much marketing or touring support, and they decided to break up the following year.

Campbell later reemerged as a solo singer-songwriter, releasing her debut solo album Tug in 1999 and following up with The Sweetest Noise in 2002. Mackie moved to Vancouver, British Columbia to work as a foley artist in film and television and continues to write and play music. Kiesewalter is currently based in New York City, where he is associated with the East Village Opera Company and the Brooklyn Rundfunk Orchestra.

== Discography ==
- Fat Man Waving (1989)
- Parade (1992)
- The Habit of Gravity (1995)
