= Stephen Scobie =

Canadian poet, critic, and scholar (born 1943)

Stephen Scobie (born 31 December 1943) is a Canadian poet, critic, and scholar.

Born in Carnoustie, Scotland, Scobie relocated to Canada in 1965. He earned a PhD from the University of British Columbia in Vancouver after which he taught at the University of Alberta and at the University of Victoria, from which he recently retired.

Scobie is a founding editor of Longspoon Press, an elected member of the Royal Society of Canada, and the recipient of the 1980 Governor General's Award for McAlmon's Chinese Opera (1980) and the 1986 Prix Gabrielle Roy for Canadian Criticism.

== Selected bibliography ==
- Babylondromat: Poems (1966)
- One Word Poems (1969)
- In the Silence of the Year (1971)
- The Birken Tree (1973)
- Stone Poems: Poems 1967-1969 (1973)
- Air Loom (1974)
- The Rooms We Are: Poems 1970-1971 (1974)
- Airwaves, Sealevel, Landlock (1978)
- Leonard Cohen (1978)
- Les toiles n'ont peur de rien (1979)
- McAlmon's Chinese Opera (1980)
- A Grand Memory for Forgetting (1981)
- Expecting Rain: New Poems (1984)
- The Ballad of Isabel Gunn (1987)
- Dunino (1989)
- Ghosts: a Glossary of the Intertext (1990)
- Remains (1990)
- Alias Bob Dylan (1991)
- Gospel: a Poem (1994)
- Taking the Gate: a Journey through Scotland (1996)
- Earthquakes and Explorations: Language and Painting from Cubism to Concrete Poetry (1997)
- And Forget my Name: a Speculative Biography of Bob Dylan (1999)
- The Spaces in Between: Selected Poems 1965-2001 (2003)
- The Measure of Paris (2010)
