= The Angstones =

Canadian band

- Origin: Ottawa, Ontario, Canada
- Genres: folk, Jazz
- Years active: 1990–1998
- Label: Canal Records
- Past members: Peter Kiesewalter; Kurt Walther; Rob Frayne; John Geggie; Ian Mackie

The Angstones were a Canadian band based in Ottawa, Ontario. Their music combined European and American folk music with humorous lyrics and jazz rhythms. The lineup consisted of Peter Kiesewalter on reeds and accordion, Kurt Walther on guitar, Rob Frayne on sax, John Geggie on bass, and Ian Mackie on drums. Members of this band also performed with Fat Man Waving and Chelsea Bridge.

== History ==
The Angstones released their first recording, Kommen Een Der Karz, in 1992. In 1993 the band performed at the Ottawa Jazz Festival.

The next year they released their second recording, When Ahab Met Moishe; the album was nominated for the Juno Award for Best Global Album at the Juno Awards of 1996.

In 1995, they released The Hills are Alive, a spoof of Rodgers and Hammerstein's The Sound of Music. That year the band performed at the Winnipeg Folk Festival and the Vancouver Folk Music Festival.

In 1997 the band performed at the Winnipeg Folk Festival, and in 1999 at the Ottawa Folk Festival. Also in 1999, they released their final album Bytown...It's My Town.

In 1999, Kiesewalter became resident House Composer at ABC (American Broadcasting Company). In 2004, in New York, he founded the Brooklyn Rundfunk Orkestrata which, in 2011, and with the blessing of the Rodgers and Hammerstein organization, created a touring production of The Hills are Alive, and produced an accompanying CD.

Frayne formed the 15-member project Dream Band and co-founded Ottawa's JazzWorks. Mackie became a foley artist, and continues to write and play music. Walther pursued his career as an artist. Geggie became a Professor of Music; as of 2022, he teaches double bass at the Crane School of Music and the Conservatoire de musique du Québec à Québec.

== Discography ==
- Kommen Een Der Karz (1992), Independent
- When Ahab Met Moishe - Soundtrack From The Motion Picture (1994), Canal Records
- The Hills Are Alive (1995), Canal Records
- Bytown...It's My Town (1998), Canal Records
