= Terry Tufts =

- Born: William Terence Tufts; 1954 (age 71–72); Gasline, Ontario, Canada
- Occupation: Singer-songwriter
- Instrument: Guitar
- Website: www.terrytufts.com

William Terence Tufts (born 1954 in Gasline, Ontario) is a Canadian singer-songwriter writing in many different musical genres.

== History ==
Tufts is a finger-style guitarist living off-grid with his wife (pianist Kathryn Briggs) in the bush in Ontario.

Tufts has been playing music for enjoyment since 1963 and as a profession since 1974. His father's job with the Canadian government moved the family to Denver, Colorado in the US in the 1960s, at a time when the folk and rock music genres were influencing opinion everywhere. Other postings that influenced him musically took him to Ottawa, Ontario, and Rome, Italy. Upon returning to Canada to complete high school, he began to work as a full-time musician and continues to do so to this day.

In 1974 he moved to Fredericton, New Brunswick, to pursue his own musical career as a singer-songwriter and guitarist for A Joint Effort (Rick Bastedo, Brian Bourne, Grant Harrison, Tim Tufts, and Terry Tufts), and later a reformed version of that band called Redrock Hotel (Dan Artuso, Brian Bourne, Mario Melanson, Tim Tufts, and Terry Tufts.) The Effort released an LP, Final Effort, upon the groups disbanding, and one 45 rpm recording with RedRock Hotel (Hitchhiker's Dream – T. Tufts b/w Your Constant Change – B. Bourne) was released in the late 70s.

Tufts has worked as a session musician and sideman for a variety of artists including Tom Paxton, Kathryn Briggs, David Francey, Colleen Peterson, Laura Smith, Laura Bird, Ian Tamblyn, Bill Garrett & Sue Lothrop, Charlie Sohmer, The Arrogant Worms, Wayne Rostad, Susan Aglukark, Tracey Brown, and George Fox.

In 2014, with Kathryn Briggs, he formed the duo K.E.W.T.(initials for Kathryn Elizabeth & William Terence). They were joined by double bassist John Geggie. Two albums were released over the next two years.

In 2016, under suggestion by luthier Linda Manzer, the trio formed The Algonquin Ensemble (with Lisa Moody – viola, Laura Nerenberg – violin, and Margaret Tobolowska – cello) to musically interpret the canvases and life story of Canadian Group of Seven motivator Tom Thomson. Their piece, Sonic Palette: Tom Thomson's Voice Through Music 100 Years Later, premiered at the McMichael Canadian Art Collection 9 July 2017 to a sold-out audience.

Tufts has recorded six albums, one of which remains unreleased. Three of these albums are on Borealis Records.

== Discography ==
=== As Part Of K.E.W.T. (with Kathryn Briggs & John Geggie) ===
- Mother Lode (2014) Blue Northern Music
- Winter Light (2015) Blue Northern Music

=== Solo ===
- Terry Tufts (1987) Snowy River Records, then Blue Northern Music
- Transparent Blue (1990) Snowy River Records, then Blue Northern Music
- Down the Eighth and Gone (1995) Blue Northern Music
- Two Nights Solo (1999) Nutshell Music
- Walk On (2001) Borealis Records
- Two Nights Solo (2002) Re-Released by Borealis Records
- Six Strings North of the Border (2003) Borealis Records
- The Better Fight (2005) Borealis Records

=== Compilation Contributions ===
- "For Lovin' Me", Beautiful: A Tribute to Gordon Lightfoot (2004)
