= Roddy Ellias =

Canadian jazz musician and composer

Roddy Ellias (born 1950) is a Canadian guitarist, composer and improviser. He performs contemporary new music, jazz, and classical repertoire.

== Career ==
Ellias was born in 1950 in Val-d'Or, Quebec and moved to Ottawa as a child, where he began learning classical guitar. He played in an amateur R&B band in high school.

Reviewers have described Ellias as "genius (Bud Freeman), "positively brilliant" (Bill McBirnie) and "exquisite …the kind of subtlety you don't often hear…anywhere."(Mark Miller). He has performed with Lee Konitz, Kenny Wheeler, Tom Harrel, Dr. Lonnie Smith, Nat Adderley, Slide Hampton, Cleo Laine, Pepper Adams, Lew Tabakin, Michel Donato, Mel Tormé, Bud Freeman, PJ Perry, Rob McConnell, the Montreal Symphony, the National Arts Centre Orchestra, and Michel Legrand. As an improviser, "Canadian guitarist and writer Matthew Warnock describes him this way: "as close to being a Zen master on the guitar as he can be."

The Ottawa Citizen reviewed a "concert by pianist Marc Copland, guitarist Roddy Ellias and bassist Adrian Vedady", calling it "deeply lyrical and personal original music."

"Ellias has had two concert series at Paradiso with local and imported musicians including an organ quartet with Kirk MacDonald, a Fourth Stage showcase of his own jazz compositions, an Ottawa Jazz Festival concert with Jeri Brown, several festival workshop and Composers' Collective concerts, as well as appearances with John Geggie, Anna Williams, Tena Palmer, Garry Elliott, Petr Cancura, and many others. And his classical compositions were featured at this year's Music and Beyond festival."
