= LaRena Clark =

Canadian folk singer (1904–1991)

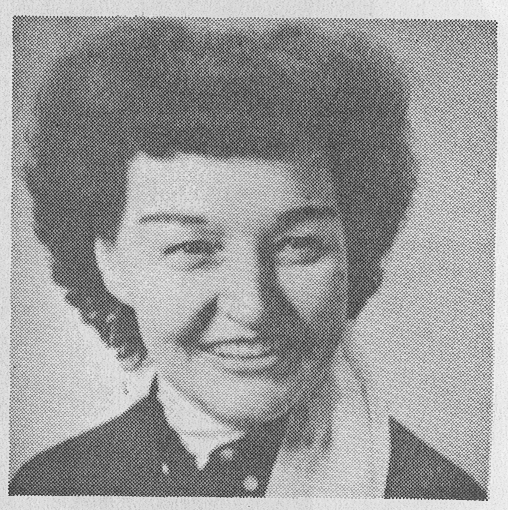
- Clark, c. 1966

Background information
- Born: LaRena LeBarr; November 21, 1904; Pefferlaw, Ontario, Canada
- Died: May 3, 1991 (aged 86) Orillia, Ontario
- Occupation: Singer
- Years active: 1961–1980

LaRena LeBarr Clark (1904–1991) was a Canadian traditional singer and folksinger.

== Early years ==
Clark was born near Pefferlaw, Ontario, Canada in 1904 near Lake Simcoe. Her father and grandfather were hunters and guides. Her mother Mary Frances Watson was also a singer. She frequently identified herself as a "ninth generation Canadian."

== Career ==
Clark became involved in the folk music circuit in Canada and the United States in the 1960s and recorded an album in 1968. She performed at the Mariposa Folk Festival in 1965 and 1966. She also performed at the Madoc Music Festival, the Philadelphia Folk Festival, and others in Canada and the United States in the late 1960s. In 1967 she and her husband built a model Canadian pioneer farmstead and toured it around the province as part of Canada's centennial celebrations in 1967. In the late 1970s she set out to record 25 albums of traditional Canadian folk and popular songs, working with a local radio station CHAY-FM, as well as recording half hour television programming in Owen Sound.

== Personal life ==
Clark was married three times and during her first two marriages she bore six children. During World War II she worked as a cook in a mess hall for the Canadian Armed Forces at Camp Bordon. While working there, she met Gordon Clark, a veteran, and the two married in 1947. The couple were living in Ottawa in 1961 when she met folklorist Edith Fowke, who collected and recorded her songs.

She died in 1991.

== Awards ==
- 1987: Marius Barbeau Medal, Folklore Studies Association of Canada

== Select recordings ==
- Clark, LaRena LeBarr (1968), Songs of an Ontario family: British ballads and Canadian shanty songs, Ontario: Clark
- Clark, LaRena LeBarr (1978), Family legend in song: Irish, English, and Scottish ballads, lumbering and railroading., Orillia, Ont.: Clark Records
- Clark, LaRena LeBarr (1978), Heritage of folk songs., Orillia, Ont.: Clark Records
- Clark, LaRena LeBarr (1979), Canada at turn of the sod: lumbering, railroading and sea ballads., Orilla, Ont.: Clark Records
- Clark, LaRena LeBarr (1979), Canada's traditional queen of song: shanty, western, sea, English, Irish, Scotch, ballads., Orillia, Ont.: Clark Records
- Clark, LaRena LeBarr (1979), Authentic Canadian folk symbol: English and American ballads; American civil war, Orillia, Ont.: Clark Records
- Clark, LaRena LeBarr (1980), Canadiana coast to coast, Orillia, Ont.: Clark Records
- Clark, LaRena LeBarr (1980), LaRena sings for country folk: vol. 2 : Canadian, American, English, Irish ballads /$cLaRena LeBarr Clark., Orillia, Ont.: Clark Records

== Additional resources ==
- Fowke, Edith and Jay Rahn. A Family Heritage: The Story and Song of LaRena Clark. Calgary: University of Calgary Press, 1994.
- Rahn, Jay (2003). "Prosody, Performance and Perception: Tempo in LaRena Clark's Ballad-Metre Songs". Canadian Journal for Traditional Music. 30: 64–83. ProQuest 1343477.
