= Smallpipe =

Smallpipes may refer to one of two kinds of bagpipes:

- The Northumbrian smallpipes
- The Scottish smallpipes

== See also ==
- Border pipes, an instrument often confused with the Scottish smallpipes
