= Jean Larrivée =

Canadian luthier

Jean Claude Larrivée
- Born: June 6, 1944; Montréal, Quebec, Canada
- Citizenship: Canadian/American
- Occupation: Luthier
- Years active: 1967–present
- Spouse: Wendy
- Children: John Jr., Matthew, Christine, Micheline
- Website: https://www.larrivee.com

Jean Larrivée is a Canadian luthier specializing in guitars and the founder of Larrivée Guitars. He was originally trained as an auto mechanic, but began making guitars in 1967.

== Early career ==
He was originally trained as a luthier by Edgar Mönch in 1967, who had recently arrived as an immigrant to Canada.

== Notable students and apprentices ==
- Grit Laskin
- Linda Manzer
- David Wren
- David Iannone
- Sergei de Jonge
