= Friends of Fiddler's Green =

- Genres: Celtic, Folk, and Roots music
- Years active: late 1960s to present
- Label: Fallen Angle Music
- Members: William Laskin, Ian Robb, James Stephens, Alistair Brown, Ian Bell, and Jeff McClintock
- Past members: Tam Kearney, David Parry, Jim Strickland, Laurence Stevenson, Ian Clark, Cherie Whalen, Rick Avery, John Bowden, Rosemary Brown, Margaret Christl, Peter Shepheard, and Stewart Cameron.

Friends of Fiddler's Green is a Canadian folk music group based in Toronto, Ontario, founded in 1971 and still active as of 2024. The members of the group at the time of its first recording, 1981's This Side of the Ocean, were Alistair Brown, Tam Kearney, Grit Laskin, David Parry, Ian Robb, Laurence Stevenson, and Jim Strickland. Another half-dozen former members from the band's first 10 years are listed on the back of the album.

In all the years since, the lineup has stayed remarkably consistent, with only Jim Strickland having left the ensemble. David Parry remained performing with the group until his death in 1995, as did Tam Kearney until his death in 2013. Additions to the line up have included singer and musician Ian Bell, and also Jeff McClintock on keyboards. Jeff was later replaced by Cherie Whalen, only to rejoin the band after Cherie's departure for family reasons. Due to ill health, Laurence Stevenson retired from the band in 2020 and esteemed fiddler James Stephens has stepped in.

The name of the group is derived from Fiddler's Green, a mythical place of dancing and happiness. Tam Kearney and Jim Strickland, both Scottish immigrants living in Toronto in the 1960s, founded Fiddler's Green Folk Club on Eglinton Avenue, behind the YMCA. Gradually a nucleus of musicians developed, initially doing warm-ups at the club, and then performing as a group. Ian Robb arrived from England, in the early 1970s. The arrival of other singers gave the group a distinctly Scottish flavor. David Parry was an enthusiast for mumming and brought a dragon's costume to the mix. At festival performances, the members may present English Mummers Plays, Morris Dancing or Scottish country dancing. The Vancouver Folk Music Festival documented a reviewer who claimed that Friends of Fiddler's Green were among the best British bands touring North America.

Although they are not typically a touring band, they have also performed in the United States.

In the folklore of folk music, they are known as the inspiration for the Stan Rogers' song, Barrett's Privateers.

In 2003, they were given the "Estelle Klein Achievement Award" at the Ontario Council of Folk Festivals.

The award recognizes individuals who have made a significant contribution to the folk music community in Ontario through their work as an artist, academic, organizer, or presenter.

The keyboardist for the group, Jeff McClintock, was arrested by the religious police in Saudi Arabia, probably in connection with his work with an otherwise all-female fiddle ensemble, the Frillyknickers.

== Discography ==
- 1981 This Side of the Ocean
- 1994 Road to Mandalay
- 1997 This Side of the Ocean (Expanded CD re-release)
- 2015 Old Inventions
- 2019 Live at The Flying Cloud Folk Club, Toronto: September 7th 2003
- 2019 'E Liked it All! David Parry In Concert With The Friends Of Fiddler's Green
- 2019 A Compendium of Wonders: Live in London, Ontario, September 2019
