= Frank Proffitt =

American musician (1913–1965)

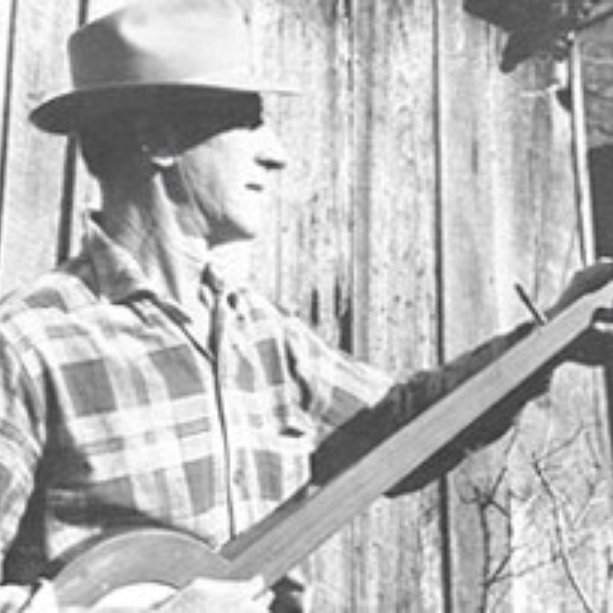
- Proffitt playing a banjo.

Background information
- Born: Frank Noah Proffitt; June 1, 1913; Laurel Bloomery, Tennessee, U.S.
- Died: November 24, 1965 (aged 52) Vilas, North Carolina, U.S.
- Genres: Folk
- Occupations: farmer, carpenter, musician
- Instruments: Banjo, appalachian dulcimer
- Years active: 1930s–1960s
- Labels: Folkways Records, Folk Legacy

Frank Noah Proffitt (June 1, 1913 – November 24, 1965) was an Appalachian Old-time banjo player and ballad singer known for his role in the preservation and popularization of the folk song "Tom Dooley." He contributed to the documentation of traditional Appalachian music through his work with several folk collectors, and his repertoire and recordings played an influential role in the mid-20th-century American folk revival.

== Life ==
Frank Proffitt was born in 1913 in Laurel Bloomery, Tennessee, to Wiley Proffitt and Rebecca Alice Creed Proffitt. When Frank was nine years old, his family moved to North Carolina and settled in the Beaver Dam community of Watauga County, close to the Tennessee border.

Proffitt grew up in a musical family, learning ballads and tunes from his parents as well as from his aunts and uncles. His father, a Civil War veteran, was a luthier who built banjos and dulcimers. Frank learned the craft from him and continued making instruments into adulthood, following his father's patterns. He gave one of his personal banjos to folklorist Jan Davidson, who was a child at the time. Proffitt married Bessie Hicks, with whom he had six children. The family lived near the house that had belonged to Frank's father. Frank used this space as his workshop for instrument building while he wasn't working as a carpenter or farming tobacco.

== Music ==
In 1937, folklorist Frank C. Brown of Duke University recorded several of Proffitt’s songs during a field-collecting trip in Watauga County. These recordings were later published in the Frank C. Brown Collection of North Carolina Folklore by Duke University Press in 1952. The following year, in 1938, Proffitt met folk song collectors Anne and Frank Warner at the home of his father-in-law, Nathan Hicks. This encounter began a friendship with the Warners that lasted three decades and resulted in their collecting more than a hundred of Proffitt’s songs, many of which were later published in Traditional American Folk Songs from the Frank and Anne Warner Collection in 1984. The Warners also shared Proffitt’s repertoire with Alan Lomax, who included a number of these songs—among them the ballad “Tom Dooley”—in his book Folksong U.S.A. The ballad later gained national popularity when The Kingston Trio recorded it in 1958, using a version they learned from a Frank Warner recording. Their hit recording is widely credited with helping spark the American folk music revival.

In 1961, Proffitt recorded a collection of traditional ballads on the album Frank Proffitt Sings Folk Songs, edited by Warner and issued by Folkways Records. A second set of Proffitt's recordings, Frank Proffitt of Reece NC: Traditional Songs and Ballads of Appalachia, was released in 1962 and included "Tom Dooley." Proffitt performed at the 1963 Newport Folk Festival. and the 1964 New York World's Fair, recording several more tracks released on the compilation album High Atmosphere: Ballads and Banjo Tunes from Virginia and North Carolina.

Proffitt died in 1965, aged 52. The Frank Proffitt Memorial Album was released by Folk Legacy Records in 1969, followed by a tribute album, Nothing Seems Better to Me: The Music of Frank Proffitt and North Carolina, issued in 2000.

== Discography ==
- Frank Proffitt Sings Folk Songs, Folkways Records
- Frank Proffitt of Reese NC, Folk-Legacy Records
- Frank Proffitt Memorial Album, Folk Legacy
- High Atmosphere: Ballads and Banjo Tunes from Virginia and North Carolina, Rounder Records
