= Helen Bonchek Schneyer =

American singer

Helen Bonchek Schneyer (January 10, 1921 in New York City – July 16, 2005 in Barre, Vermont) was an American folk musician. She was raised Jewish in New York City. While a student at Columbia University, she was introduced to American folk music. She also sang Baptist spirituals.

Over a sixty-year career, Schneyer worked with such influential artists as Pete Seeger and Woody Guthrie. Later in life, Schneyer frequently appeared on A Prairie Home Companion as well as at many folk festivals.
