= Estelle Klein =

Canadian art director

- Born: February 3, 1930; Buffalo, New York
- Died: June 17, 2004 (aged 74); Belleville, Ontario, Canada
- Occupation: Artistic director
- Years active: 1964-1980
- Employer: Mariposa Folk Festival

Estelle Klein (February 3, 1930 – June 17, 2004) was an advocate and supporter of folk music in Canada and held numerous influential positions with cultural and heritage organizations during her lengthy career.

== Life ==
Klein was born in Buffalo, New York, and moved to Toronto, Canada, with her parents in 1933. She attended Camp Naivelt, a Jewish camp known for advocating socialist ideals, in Brampton, Ontario. The camp was known for supporting folk music culture and Klein would have gained exposure to musical styles and people who later figured in the folk revival in Canada. There Klein also met the man who would later become her husband. She married Jack in 1950.

During the early 1950s, Klein worked at Settlement House in Toronto. She organized music for children as well as advocated for better employment conditions for local musicians. This early involvement with the labour movement provided an important influence for her later work in advocating for the folk music community in Canada.

Klein became the artistic director for the Mariposa Folk Festival from 1964, and remained in the position until 1980. She instituted a number of changes and she did not share the "purist" vision of folk music, as espoused by the previous artistic director of the Festival. She is also noted for shaping the Festival format, one that included more interaction with folk musicians through the development of workshops, as well as including aboriginal artists in the festival. This was a format that was replicated at many other folk festivals in Canada. The workshops were intended to bring together artists who might not normally perform together and often put them close to their audiences. This is a format that has been retained today. Her wider view of what constituted folk music influenced the artistic programming and saw the festival include American blues artists such as the Reverend Gary Davis, Inuit throat singing as well as Métis dancers. Klein formally incorporated indigenous content into the Festival in 1966 with an appearance by the Canadian Indian Dancers.

In recognition of her contributions to folk music in Canada, the Ontario Council of Folk Festivals established the Estelle Klein Award as their highest award, intended to honour those who have provided major contributions to folk music in Canada.
