= Rob Frayne =

Canadian jazz musician

Rob Frayne (born 1957) is a Canadian jazz saxophonist, arranger and bandleader based in Ottawa, Ontario. He was part of the bands Chelsea Bridge and the Angstones, but his career was interrupted by a serious car crash in 2004. Following that, he concentrated on composing, then made a gradual return to public playing.

== Career ==
Frayne was born in 1957. He started playing the saxophone in his teens. In the 1990s and early 2000s, Frayne was the premier saxophonist in Ottawa, his home town. He played in such groups as Chelsea Bridge and the Angstones. He had played with the Gil Evans Orchestra, Kenny Wheeler, and Toronto's costumed jazz cut-ups the Shuffle Demons. Outside of Canada, he played concerts in New York, Washington, Norway and the U.K.

In 2004, Frayne was involved in a car crash, following which he had a stroke and was in hospital for over two months. He had "partial paralysis and a left lung that didn't work", so even following recovery his saxophone capability was reduced. He therefore concentrated on composing music, including for his Dream Band project, the first, 15-piece, iteration of which performed in 2012.

Frayne returned to small-group public performance with a quartet gig in 2014. He continued with such appearances and commented four years later: "After getting hit by a truck, you don't really care so much about what people think [...] I just play the stuff I really like, and feel good about it."

In 2015, Frayne led an octet and the second edition of his Dream Band. He became music director of the Ottawa-based JazzWorks jazz camp in 2016. Another iteration of the Dream Band had performances in 2018.

== Discography ==
=== As leader/co-leader ===
- Rob Frayne Dreamband Home (Bowl of Notes Records, 2013)
- Skeezix I and II (Jazz Tunesy Records, 1998)
- Blues in a Sharp Sea (Unity, 1992)
- Tatamagouche...Next Left (Unity, 1994)
- Double Feature (Unity, 1995)
