= Borealis Records =

Canadian folk/roots record label (founded 1996)

- Founded: 1996
- Genre: Folk; Roots
- Country of origin: Canada
- Location: Toronto, Ontario

Borealis Records is a Canadian record label, founded in 1996 by four Canadian musicians. It is notable as being focused exclusively on the recording and development of Canadian folk and roots music artists.

== History ==
In 1996, Canadian musicians Grit Laskin, Bill Garrett, Paul Mills and Ken Whiteley established Borealis Records. The mandate of the company is (a) to record only Canadian artists, (b) to seek out artists from all of Canada's regions, (c) to enter into "ethical artist agreements that are fair and typically more generous than what is the industry standard" and (d) to present all the diverse styles of music under the Folk and Roots umbrella.

Artists recording for Borealis Records include Aengus Finnan, Linda McRae, Eve Goldberg, Ron Hynes, Nathan Rogers, Mose Scarlett, Oliver Schroer, Bob Snider, Terry Tufts, Jackie Washington, Penny Lang and Sneezy Waters.

The label is associated with True North Records and Linus Entertainment. In addition to individual artist releases, Borealis Records released Beautiful: A Tribute to Gordon Lightfoot (2003), in which Borealis artists and others interpreted the songs of Gordon Lightfoot.
