= Mariposa Folk Festival =

Folk music festival

Coordinates: 44.6071°N 79.3872°W

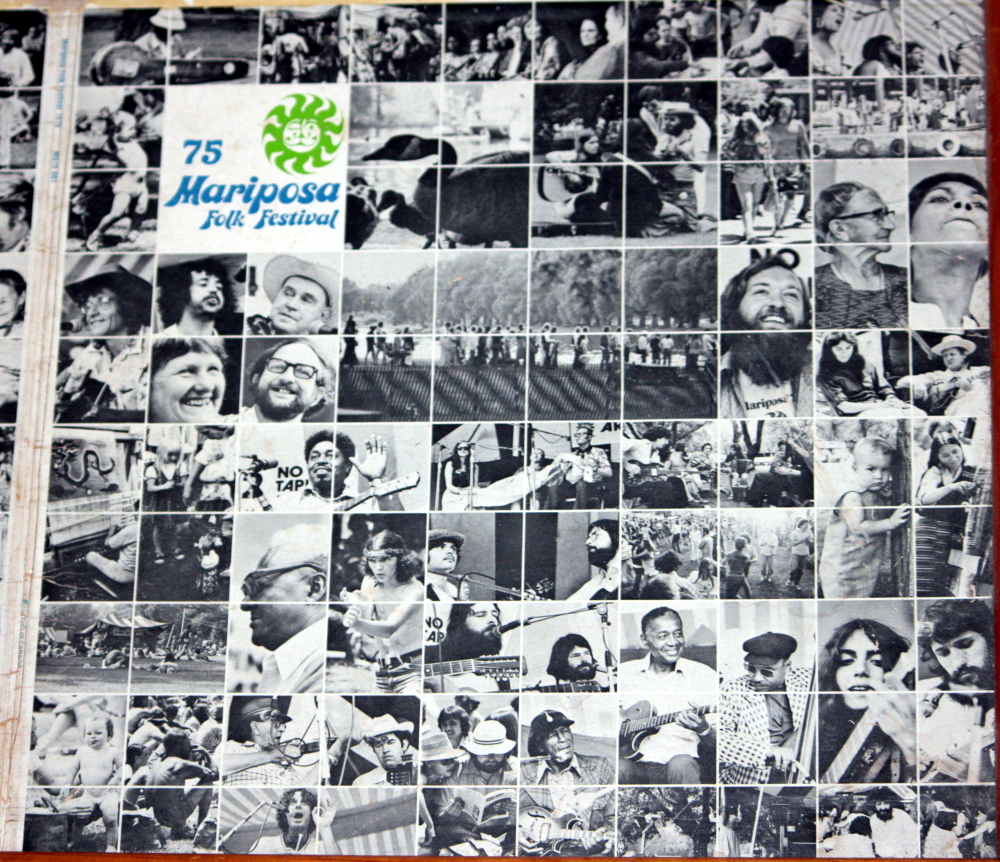
- Mariposa 1975 album cover
- Genre: Music festival, arts festival
- Dates: July 7–9 (2023 dates)
- Locations: Tudhope Park, Orillia, Ontario, Canada
- Years active: 1961-present
- Founders: Ruth Jones (nee Major), Dr. Frederick Crawford (Casey) Jones
- Website: www.mariposafolk.com

Mariposa Folk Festival is a Canadian music festival founded in 1961 in Orillia, Ontario. It was held in Orillia for three years before being banned because of disturbances by festival-goers. After being held in various places in Ontario for a few decades, it returned to Orillia in 2000. Ruth Jones, her husband Frederick Crawford Jones, her brother David Major and Pete McGarvey organized the first Mariposa Folk Festival in August 1961. The inaugural event, covered by the Canadian Broadcasting Corporation, featured all Canadian performers. The festival grew in popularity, size and rowdiness until the popularity of the 1963 festival (with over 8,000 advance tickets sold), and the lack of sufficient security, led to a backlash from town locals. The city of Orillia secured a court injunction to prevent the festival from continuing in the town limits. The first festival held in the Toronto area, in 1964, was at Maple Leaf Stadium. The subsequent three festivals were held at Innis Lake in Caledon, northwest of the city. In the 1970s it was held on the Toronto Islands before shifting to Harbourfront (Toronto) and Bathurst Street and later Molson Park in Barrie. In 2000, the Mariposa Folk Festival was invited back to Orillia by city councilors Tim Lauer and Don Evans. The festival continues to be held in Orillia. As well as folk music, the festival highlights other aspects of folk culture including dance, crafts, storytelling.

== Festival timeline ==
The Mariposa Folk Festival has been held in these Ontario locations with these artistic directors:

- 1961 – 64, Oval Park, Orillia
- 1964, Maple Leaf Stadium, Toronto
- 1965 – 67, Innis Lake, Caledon
- 1968 – 79, Centre Island, Toronto
- 1980 – 81, no festival
- 1982, Harbourfront, Toronto
- 1983, small event at Christie Pits park, Toronto
- 1984 – 90, Molson Park, Barrie
- 1991 – 1992, Ontario Place, Toronto
- 1993 – 1995, Olympic Island & Downtown, Toronto
- 1996, Annie Williams Park, Bracebridge, and Victoria Park, Cobourg
- 1997, Annie Williams Park, Bracebridge
- 1998 - Bracebridge
- 1999, Parkdale, Toronto
- 2000 – present, Tudhope Park, Orillia

Artistic directors:

- 1961 - 64, Ted Schaefer
- 1964 – 77, Estelle Klein
- 1978, Ken Whiteley
- 1979, Estelle Klein
- 1982, Tim Harrison
- 1984, Michael Cooney
- 1985, Ian Bell
- 1986, Rick Bauer
- 1987 – 88, Drago Maleiner
- 1989 - 92, Richard Flohil
- 1993 - 94, David Warren
- 1995, Jeff Cohen
- 1996, Artistic Committee: David Warren, Dianne Myers, Karen Carlson-Oriotis, Randi Fratkin
- 1997, Neil Hutchinson
- 2000 - 2006, Randi Fratkin
- 2006 - 2017, Mike Hill
- 2017–2023, Liz Scott
- 2023-Present, Spencer Shewen

In addition, over the years there have been some alternative concerts and festivals, splinter groups, sub-festivals, and spin-offs, such as Mariposa-in-the-City in Toronto in 2000.

== Early years ==
The idea for the Mariposa Folk Festival was created by Ruth (nee Major) and her husband Casey Jones, after hearing a presentation by John Fisher. The name for the festival was borrowed from Stephen Leacock's Book Sunshine Sketches of a Little Town, set in the fictional town of Mariposa which was inspired by the real-life town of Orillia.

Mariposa Folk Festival was held for the first time in 1961.

In 1964 the festival moved unexpectedly to Toronto. Backlash from Orillia and Medonte township community members prevented the festival from continuing in its original location. Due to these circumstances as well as inclement weather, many people who had bought tickets to the festival did not attend.

In 1966 the festival's format changed, under the direction of Estelle Klein. It became more workshop-based and featured multiple stages so that different performances could occur simultaneously.

1968 was the first year that the festival started on a Friday night. It was advertised with a focus on workshops rather than on headlining acts.

In 1969 CBC filmed throughout the weekend of the festival, and created a documentary entitled “Mariposa: A Folk Festival”, which aired on September 28, 1969.

== 1970s ==
In 1970 the "Native People area" at the festival was expanded, and was a success with festival visitors. This year also featured workshops investigating instrumental styles, music of specific regions and song exchanges.

In 1971 there were no evening concerts or main stage performances. The festival was fully focused on workshops and small stage performances in order to promote smaller acts as well as already well known performers.

The 1972 festival experienced heavy rainfall, but that did not affect festival attendance. Some well known musicians came to watch the festival including Joni Mitchell, Neil Young, Gordon Lightfoot, Bob Dylan and Jackson Browne and some of them were interested in performing. The festival organizers were unsure if they should include these performers because the festival was no longer focused on big name acts. Ultimately, Murray McLauchlan offered Joni Mitchell part of his performance time. Bruce Cockburn did the same for Neil Young.

The 1973 festival featured musicians from around the world including Bai Konte from West Africa, Martin Carthy from England, Ardoin Family from Louisiana in the United States and the Boys of the Lough from Ulster and North England.

1975 was International Women's year, so the festival added many more female performers.

In 1976 the festival received a government grant so that they could include a special group of Indigenous performers from the prairies.

In 1977 the festival focused on the origins of North American folk music. The large variety of music was represented under four themes: black, Spanish, francophone and English.

The 1979 festival featured a special pavilion of Labrador craftspeople, musicians and storytellers. It also increased its folk music activities for children.

== 50th anniversary ==
In 2010, Mariposa celebrated its 50th festival by fielding a lineup of classic Mariposa artists and young developing talent. Gordon Lightfoot, Murray McLauchlan, Ian and Sylvia, and The Whiteley Brothers took the main stage on the festival's final day. Three new performers passed an audition to perform via the "up and coming showcase" program. The 2010 edition also featured Jason Collett and Serena Ryder, who headlined the mainstage on Friday and Saturday respectively.

To mark the 50th anniversary of the festival, York University's Clara Thomas Archives and Special Collections launched an online exhibit highlighting a selection of archival material from the 1960s and 1970s. York acquired the Mariposa Folk Fest archives, which includes sound recordings and publicity documents, in 2007.

== Notable performers ==
- Jackson Browne
- Bruce Cockburn
- Leonard Cohen
- Leon Redbone
- Edith Fowke
- Gordon Lightfoot
- Joni Mitchell
- Alanis Obomsawin
- Buffy Saint-Marie
- Neil Young
- John Prine
- Arlo Guthrie

== Mariposa in the Schools ==
In the mid-1970s the Mariposa Folk Festival began featuring children's concerts and musical workshops. In addition to this, the year round program "Mariposa in the Schools" was created in order to bring folk musicians to local Ontario schools for musical programming. The Mariposa in the Schools program ended in 2018. However, the Festival continues to have children's programming on the festival weekend in their Folkplay area.

== Publications ==
In 1977, editors Bill Usher and Linda Page-Harpa published an anthology in celebration of the festival titled "For what time I am in this world" : stories from Mariposa.

In 2013, Sija Tsai published a doctoral thesis on the history of the festival, titled Mariposa Folk Festival: The Sounds, Sights, and Costs of a Fifty-Year Road Trip.

In 2017, Michael Hill, the artistic director and the vice-president of Mariposa, and an organizer with the festival since 2000, published a book on the festival.
