= William Laskin =

Canadian luthier and musician

William Laskin CM, RCA
- Born: August 23, 1953 (age 73); Hamilton, Ontario, Canada
- Other names: Grit Laskin, The Masked Luthier
- Occupations: luthier, musician
- Website: williamlaskin.com

William "Grit" Laskin (born August 23, 1953) is a Canadian luthier and musician, particularly notable for his high-quality instruments, acoustic guitar innovations (such as the "Laskin Armrest" and "Ribrest") and for his skill in the art of inlay. Larry Robinson, author of The Art Of Inlay, describes Laskin as "one of the most astonishing inlay artists in North America." His guitars have been exhibited as works of art by several museums.

== Career ==
As a musician, he has several solo albums, and is known as a member of Friends of Fiddler's Green. He accompanied Stan Rogers (sometimes under the epithet "The Masked Luthier of Dupont Street") both on recordings and on tour.

Laskin learned the trade through an apprenticeship with Jean Larrivée, beginning in 1971. He makes approximately 20 to 24 guitars per year and he has made guitars for many well-known artists such as: k.d. lang, Owen McBride, Margaret Christl, Paul Mills, Ben Mink, Garnet Rogers and Stan Rogers, Claudia Schmidt, Lillebjorn Nilsen, and José Valle ('Chuscales').

He has written numerous books and articles, including The World of Musical Instrument Makers: A Guided Tour, which became the basis for the exhibit "Handmade for Music" at the Ontario Science Centre and various locations throughout Ontario in 1988 and 1989. Laskin is also one of the founders of the Association of Stringed Instrument Artisans and the Canadian Folk Music Awards.

== Awards and honours ==
- Saidye Bronfman Award (1997)
- Estelle Klein Award (2010)
- Member of the Order of Canada (2012)

== Works ==
=== Solo albums ===
- Unmasked (1979)
- Lila's Jig (1987)
- A Few Simple Words (1995)
- Earthly Concerns (1998)

=== Other albums ===
- Between the Breaks...Live! (1979) Stan Rogers
- The Barley Grain for Me (1998) Margaret Christl and Ian Robb with Grit Laskin

=== Books ===
- Laskin, Grit; Pickell, Brian (1987). The World of Musical Instrument Makers: A Guided Tour. Oakville, Ontario: Mosaic Press. ISBN 978-0-88962-349-1. OCLC 16579105.
- Laskin, Grit (1996). Angel Could Smell the Fire. Oakville, Ontario: Mosaic Press. ISBN 978-0889626010. OCLC 16579105.
- Laskin, Grit (2003). A Guitarmaker's Canvas: The Inlay Art of Grit Laskin. Berkeley, CA: Backbeat Books. ISBN 978-0-87930-756-1. OCLC 52380931..
- Laskin, William "Grit" (2016). Grand Complications: 50 Guitars + 50 Stories. Vancouver, BC: Figure 1 Publishing. ISBN 978-1927958841.

== Literary reference ==
A character in the Charles de Lint novel Moonheart owns a Grit Laskin guitar.
