= Edith Fowke =

Canadian folklorist (1913–1996)

Edith Fowke CM
- Born: Edith Margaret Fulton; April 30, 1913; Lumsden, Saskatchewan, Canada
- Died: March 28, 1996 (aged 82); Toronto, Ontario, Canada
- Education: University of Saskatchewan
- Employer: CBC Radio
- Title: Member of Order of Canada
- Spouse: Frank Fowke
- Parent(s): William and Margaret Fulton

Edith Fulton Fowke, CM (née Margaret Fulton; 30 April 1913 – 28 March 1996) was a Canadian folklorist.

== Biography ==
Edith Fowke was born Edith Margaret Fulton in Lumsden, Saskatchewan, Canada. Her parents were William and Margaret Fulton, and she had a sister. She was educated at the University of Saskatchewan, graduating with a bachelor degree by 1933 and a master's degree in 1937.

She taught school for a short period and edited magazines, including Western Teacher and Food for Thought. She hosted the CBC Radio program Folk Song Time from 1950 to 1963. She wrote numerous books in collaboration with folklorist and composer Richard Johnston, including Folk Songs of Canada (Waterloo Music Company 1954), Folk Songs of Quebec (Waterloo 1957), Chansons canadiennes françaises (Waterloo 1964), and More Folk Songs of Canada (Waterloo 1967). She is particularly noted for recording the songs of traditional singers O. J. Abbott, LaRena Clark, and Tom Brandon.

She married Frank Fowke in 1938. They traveled many times to Britain. Edith Fowke died in Toronto in 1996.

== Books ==
- Folk Songs of Canada (1954)
- Fowke, Edith (1969). Sally Go Round The Sun: 300 Songs, Rhymes, and Games of Canadian Children. ISBN 0-385-02513-0.
- Lumbering Songs from the Northern Woods (1970)
- Fowke, Edith; Morrison, Bram (1972). Canadian vibrations = Vibrations canadiennes. Toronto: Macmillan of Canada.
- Fowke, Edith, ed. (1973). The Penguin Book of Canadian Folk Songs. Selected and Edited by Edith Fowke.
- Fowke, Edith; Glazer, Joe (1973). Songs of Work and Protest. New York: Dover Publications. ISBN 9780486228990. OCLC 260008507.
- Folklore of Canada: Tall Tales, Stories, Rhymes and Jokes From Every Corner of Canada (1976)
- Fowke, Edith Fulton (1979). Folktales of French Canada. Toronto: NC Press. ISBN 978-0-919601-01-7. OCLC 918171103.
- Singing Out History: Canada's Story in song (1984)
- Fowke, Edith; Boykowycz, Katherine (1985). Traditional Singers and Songs from Ontario.
- Red Rover, Red Rover: Children's Games Played in Canada (1988)
- Tales Told in Canada (1988)
- Canadian Folklore Perspectives on Canadian Folklore (1988)
- Fowke, Edith Fulton; Rahn, Jay (1994). A Family Heritage: The Story and Songs of Larena Clark.
- Legends Told in Canada. 1995.
- Fowke, Edith (1993). Folktales of French Canada.
- Vikar, L; Panagapka, Jeanette (2004). Edith Fowke (ed.). Songs of the North Woods: As sung by O J Abbott.

== Recordings ==
- Collected Folk Songs are in the Canadian Museum of Civilization.

Commercially issued recordings:

- "Irish and British Songs from the Ottawa Valley" (sung by O. J. Abbott) (Folkways FM 4051)
- "Authentic Canadian Folk symbol" (sung by LaRena Clark) (Clark Records LCS 108) (1978)
- "Canada at Turn of the Sod" (sung by LaRena Clark) (LCS 110) (1979)
- "Canada's Queen of Song" (sung by LaRena Clark) (LCS 107) (1978)
- "LaRena Clark: Canadian Garland" (Topic 12T140) (1965)
- "Far Canadian Fields: Companion to the Penguin Book of Canadian Folk Songs" Leader LEE 4057 (1975)
- "Folk Songs of Ontario" (Folkways FM 4005) (1958)
- "Lumbering Songs from the Ontario Shanties" (Folkways FM 4052) (1961)
- "Tom Brandon of Peterborough, Ontario" (Folk-Legacy FSC-10) (1963)

== Awards and honours ==
- 1978: Member of the Order of Canada
- 1983: Fellow of Royal Society of Canada
- 2000: Lifetime Achievement Award, Folk Alliance (posthumous)
- 2011: Canadian Songwriters Hall of Fame
