= Michael Cooney (musician) =

American folk and blues musician

- Born: Michael B. Cooney; January 19, 1943 (age 83); Carmel, California
- Genres: Folk, Blues
- Occupation: musician
- Instruments: Vocals, guitars, banjos, ukulele, concertina, harmonica, Jew’s harp, nose-flute, pennywhistle
- Labels: Folk Legacy, Front Hall Records, Alliance Records, Cove Haven Records
- Spouse: Margot Bridgett Cooney
- Website: michaelcooney.com

Michael B. Cooney (born January 19, 1943; Carmel, California) is an American folk and blues musician who performed during the folk music revival from the 1960s onward. He is known for his blues performances as well as for performing at, and organizing, many folk festivals. In 1963, he participated in a "Young Folksinger's Contest" at the Monterey Folk Festival; Barbara Dane was the contest judge and another contest participant was Janis Joplin.

Cooney was the featured musical guest on a first-season episode of Sesame Street (episode 33, originally aired December 24, 1969). He performed at the Philadelphia Folk Festival 23 times from 1967 to 2001. He also performed at the Old Songs Festival.

Most of the material that Cooney recorded were his arrangements of traditional songs. Many recording musicians copyright their arrangements of older songs in order to receive "author" royalties. But when Cooney did this, according to a note on his "Singer of Old Songs" album, he donated his royalties to the Folksong Archives at the Library of Congress.

Cooney served on the boards of the Newport Folk Festival and also the National Folk Festival.

== Personal life ==
Cooney has completely retired from performing and lives with his wife, Margot in Friendship, Maine and got more than 1 divorce before marrying her. He stepped away from touring and the public eye—following an accident and as he grew older—and now considers himself completely retired from his career as an entertainer.

== Discography ==
Solo

- The Cheese Stands Alone (Folk Legacy FSI-35, 1968; available from Smithsonian Folkways) [named after the last verse in The Farmer in the Dell] Many cuts available on YouTube
- Singer of Old Songs (Front Hall FHR-07, 1975)
- Still Cooney After All These Years (Front Hall FHR-016, 1979)
- Pure Unsweetened (live) (Alliance Records AR-001, 1982)
- Singer Of Old Songs...Still Cooney After All These Years (Front Hall FHR-304CD, 2001) (compilation of FHR-07 and FHR-016)
- Together Again (Cove Haven Records CHRCD001, 2002)

With The New Golden Ring

- Five Days Singing, Volume I (Folk Legacy) (FSI-41, 1971) (CD-41, 1996)
- Five Days Singing, Volume II (Folk Legacy) (FSI-42, 1971) (CD-42, 1996)
