= Ian Robb =

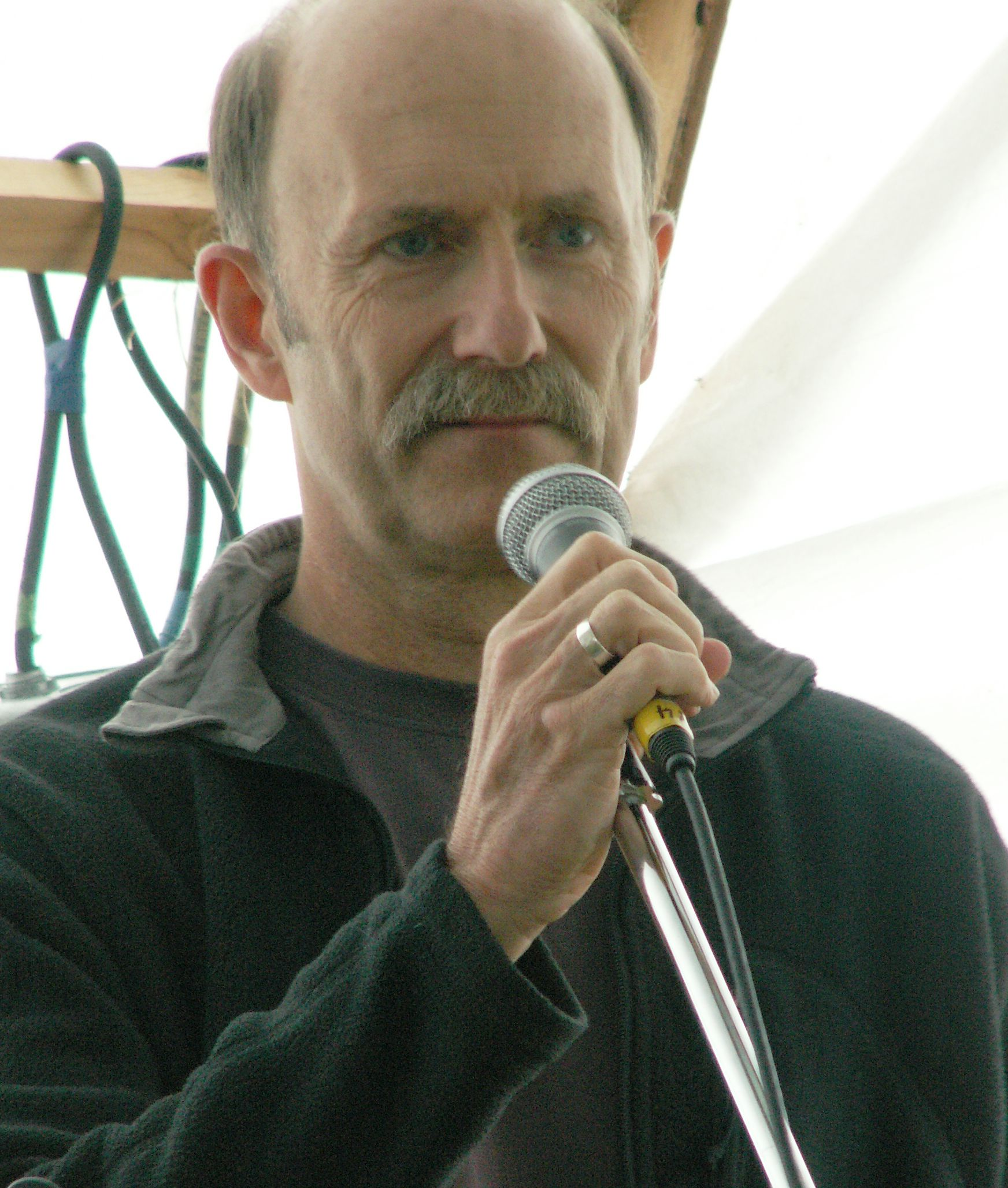

Background information
- Origin: England
- Genres: Folk music
- Instrument: concertina
- Years active: 1976–current
- Labels: Fallen Angle, Folk Legacy
- Website: http://ianrobb.com

Ian Robb is an English-born folk singer and songwriter, currently based in Ottawa, Ontario. He was a founding member of Friends of Fiddler's Green, and a columnist for Sing Out! He is also a member of the Canadian folk trio Finest Kind. He wrote a parody of Stan Rogers song "Barrett's Privateers", titled "Garnet's Homemade Beer". He was the recipient of the 2005 Canadian Folk Music Award for Best Traditional Singer, for his work on the CD Jiig.

== Notable songs written by Robb ==
- "They're Taking It Away"
- "The Old Rose and Crown"
- "Garnet's HomeMade Beer"
- "Diana" (commemorating Lady Diana's 1981 marriage to Prince Charles)

== Recordings ==
Solo CDs

- Ian Robb and Hang the Piper, Folk-Legacy Records
- Rose and Crown, Folk-Legacy Records
- From Different Angels, 1994

CDs as part of Finest Kind

- Lost in a Song 1996
- Heart's Delight 1999
- Silks& Spices 2004
- Feasts & Spirits (with John D. Huston) 2004
- For Honour & For Gain 2010

Other CDs

- Ian Robb and Hang the Piper with Grit Laskin, Seamus McGuire, John Goodman, Terry Rudden, 1979
- Margaret Christl & Ian Robb with Grit Laskin The Barley Grain for Me 1998

CD as part of Jiig

- Jiig 2005

== Bibliography ==
- Schmid, Will. (1987). New Folk Favorites: For Guitar, Vocal, Acoustic Instruments. Milwaukee, WI: Hal Leonard Publishing Corp., (Ian Robb entry page 17)
