= Flame-Sim =

- Developer: Flame Sim LLC.
- Initial release: June 2008
- Latest release: 2.0 / October 2009
- Official website: http://www.flame-sim.com/

Flame-Sim is a fire department training simulation software package that is targeted toward fire departments to assist their training efforts for fire ground operations. This training is generally focused on the reinforcement of both the department specific and National Fire Protection Association (and National Incident Management System) standard operating procedures and guidelines for improving tactical decisions during a real structure fire. In general terms, the software is a computer-based training tool for handling communication and activity on a fire ground.

Flame-Sim is developed by Flame-Sim, LLC, which is located in Hoffman Estates, Illinois. The company was established in 2007 with the intent on creating a training platform for firefighters to train in a virtual environment. In June, 2008, they released Flame-Sim 1.0. This was subsequently updated with new features and environments in October, 2009.

== Usage ==
Flame-Sim has seen adoption in various markets of the fire services. It is an accredited course material by the Florida Bureau of Fire Standards and Training, and is a current course for Florida State Fire College Virtual Experience Skills Training (VEST) as well as a major portion of the Houston Fire Department’s training program and facility.

Some of the current users of Flame-Sim are: Allen Fire Department (Allen, TX), Plano Fire Department (Plano, TX), Wheat Ridge Fire Protection District (Wheat Ridge, CO), Dunbar High School (Dayton, OH), Waukesha County Technical College (Pewaukee, WI), Florida State Fire College (Ocala, FL), Wheeling Fire Department (Wheeling, IL), and Red Deer Emergency Services (Alberta, Canada).

The Federal Emergency Management Agency (FEMA) has assisted some fire departments financially in acquiring the software through the Assistance to Firefighters Grant (AFG).

== Components ==
Dynamic Combustion Model

Flame-Sim uses a "dynamic" combustion model that was built based on the body of work done by National Institute of Standards and Technology (NIST). The model supposedly allows the simulated fire to spread in a more "dynamic" manner, by including such factors as ambient temperature, as well as proximity to other burning objects as a method of fire growth and spread. Situations such as ventilation, volume, pressure, and material properties are also included as factors.

Scenario Creation

The program includes an editing application, which allows users to create their own training scenarios. According to the maker's website, the following items are customizable: residence type, water supply, vehicle staging, ignition points, ignition timers, "hazardous materials", placement and status of victims, window and door placements, "garage status", apparatus type, names, inventory, color, arrival delay, turnout gear, arriving personnel, and air supply time.

Networking

The software also allows networked usage for up to 10 live users. Networking is performed through LAN or VLAN. All users communicate using in-system command interfaces that are built into the software, however, some users have allegedly found it effective to utilize their standard radios as they would on an actual fireground training exercise to communicate and coordinate their efforts.

After Action Reporting

The program creates a timeline of events that occur in the simulation that can be printed and reviewed by users. All feedback from the software uses an XML format, and so is portable between a number of different systems and programs. The system tracks 59 different NFPA and NIST guidelines for evaluation by each user for immediate feedback.

== Current ==
Flame-Sim operates its own website. In addition, the company is actively pursuing teaching classes, such as those offered at the FDIC Trade Show. The company offers downloads of a demonstration version of the software, as well as numerous website and fire industry trade publications.
