= Rollover (fire) =

Developmental stage of a structure fire

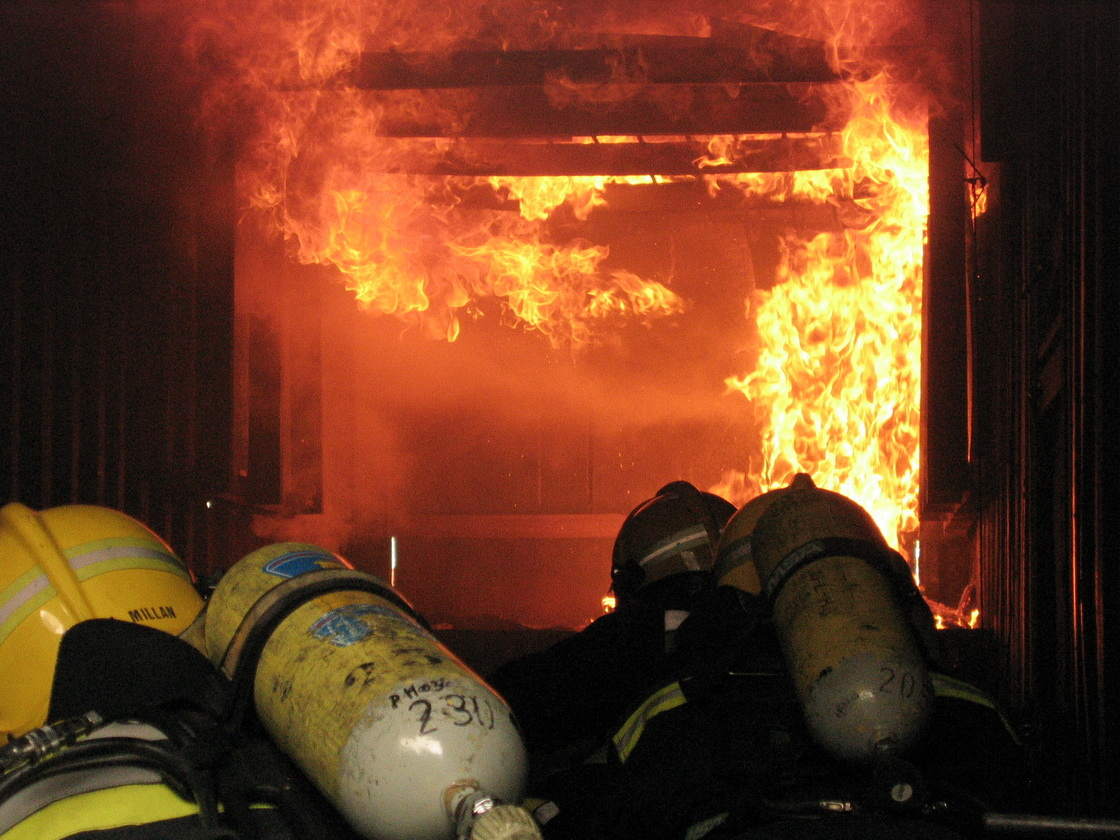

Rollover (also known as flameover) is a stage of a structure fire when fire gases in a room or other enclosed area ignite. Since heated gases, the product of pyrolysis, rise to the ceiling, this is where a rollover phenomenon is most often witnessed. Visually, this may be seen as flames "rolling" across the ceiling, radiating outward from the seat of the fire to the extent of gas spread.

Rollover is not the same as flashover, although it may precede it, and the terms may be confused. In the case of rollover, only gases present in the room, not the room contents, ignite.
