= Backdraft =

Rapid or explosive burning of superheated gasses in a fire

A backdraft (North American English), backdraught (British English) or smoke explosion is the abrupt burning of superheated gases in a fire caused when oxygen rapidly enters a hot, oxygen-depleted environment; for example, when a window or door to an enclosed space is opened or broken. Backdrafts are typically seen as a blast of smoke and/or flame out of an opening of a building. Backdrafts present a serious threat to firefighters. There is some debate concerning whether backdrafts should be considered a type of flashover.

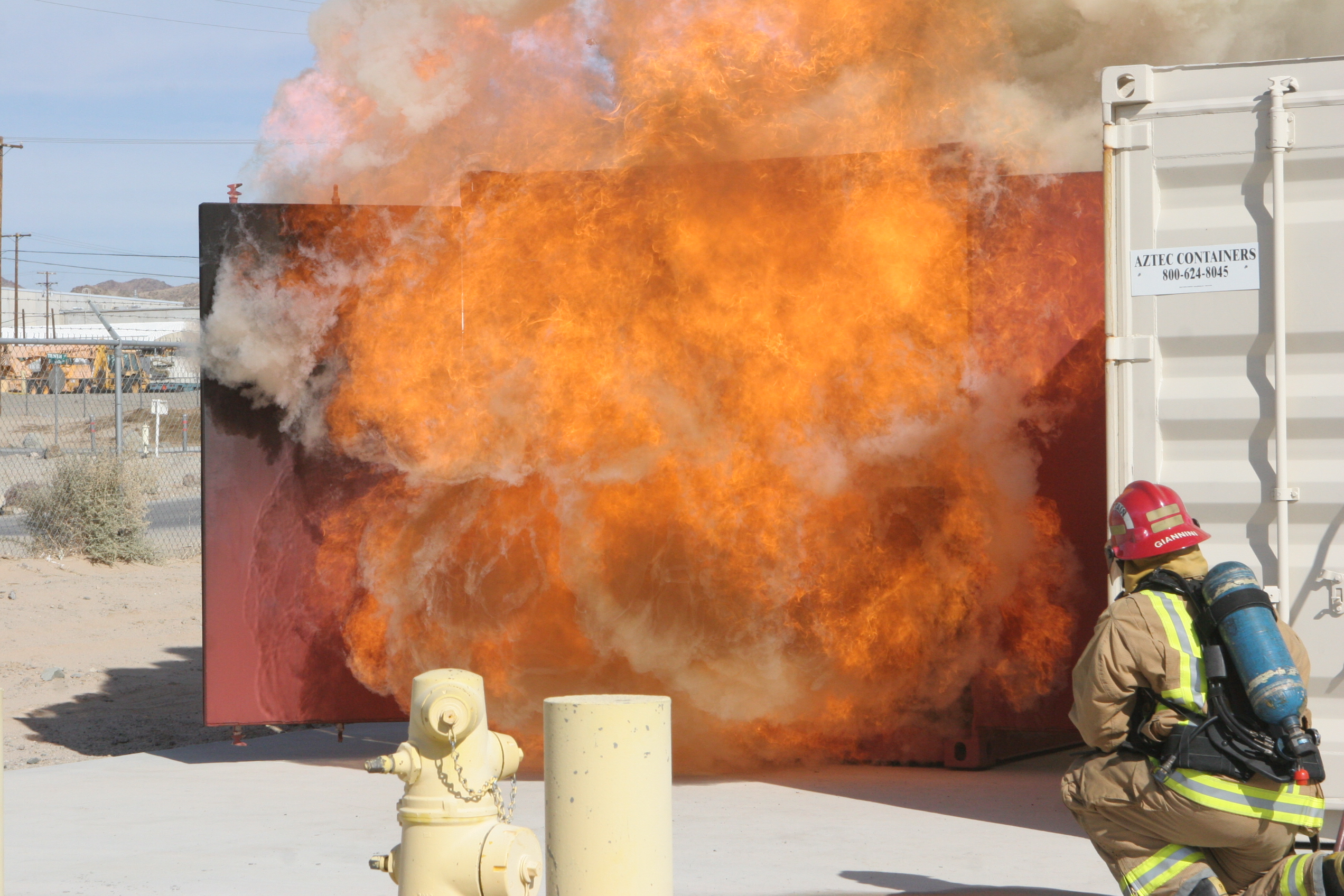
A firefighter demonstrates the behavior of a backdraft during live-fire training.

Explosive combustion of hydrogen. Escaping hydrogen is ignited, while the removal of the bottom cap allows air to enter. Eventually, the air mixes with the hydrogen inside the container, causing an explosion. A similar process occurs during a backdraft, with the introduction of oxygen and mixing with unburnt gases causing abrupt or even explosive combustion.

== Burning ==
When material is heated enough, it begins to break down into smaller compounds, including flammable or even explosive gas, typically hydrocarbons. This is called pyrolysis, and does not require oxygen. If oxygen is also provided, then the hydrocarbons can combust, starting a fire.

If material undergoing pyrolysis is later given sufficient oxygen, the hydrocarbons will ignite and, therefore, combustion takes place.

== Cause ==
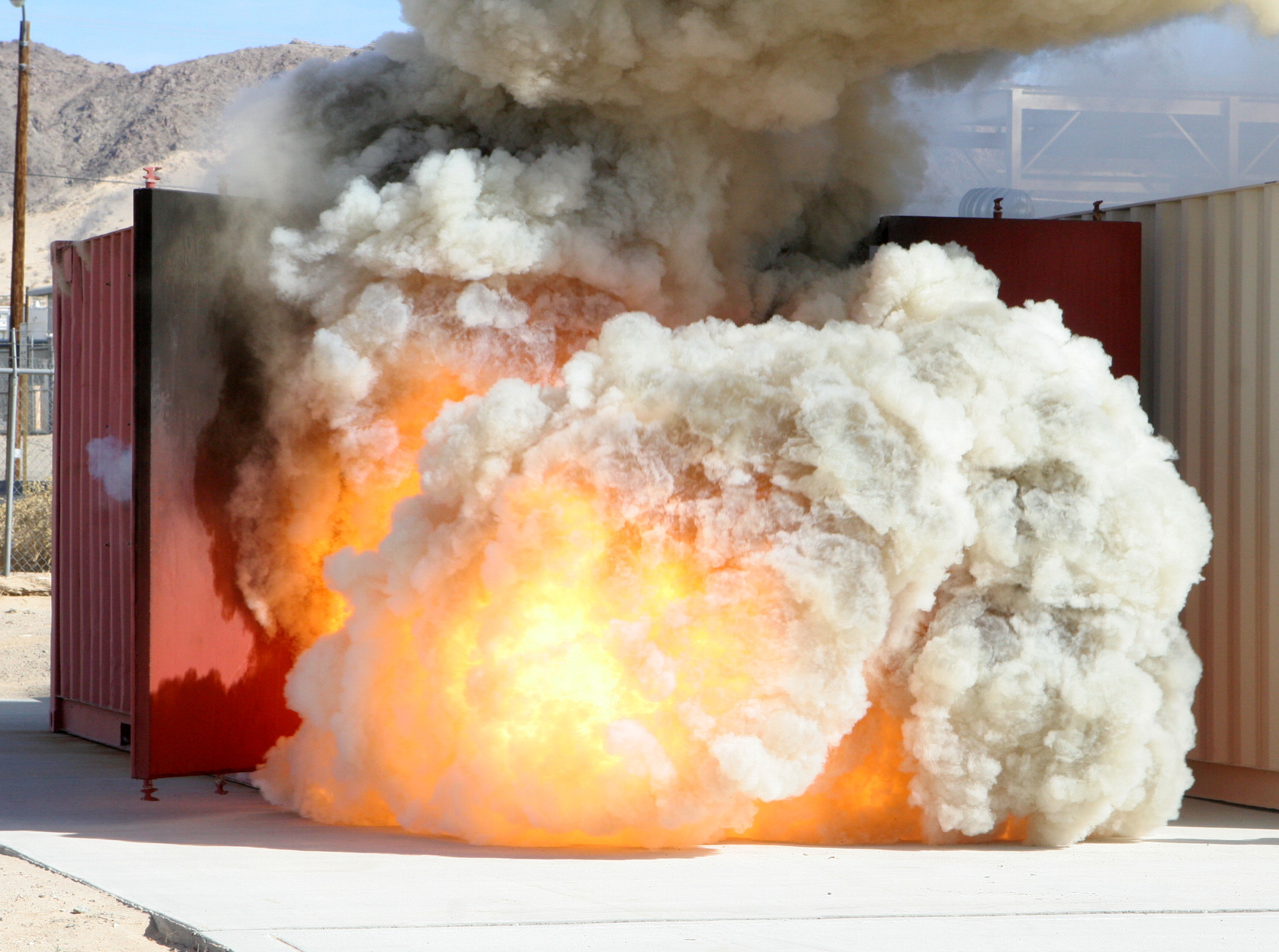
Incompletely combusted smoke can ignite explosively.

A backdraft can occur when a compartment fire has little or no ventilation. Due to this, little or no oxygen can flow into the compartment. Then, because fires reduce oxygen, the oxygen concentration decreases. When the oxygen concentration becomes too low to support combustion, some or all of the combustion switches to pyrolysis. Nonetheless, the hydrocarbons and smoke (primarily particulate matter) remain at a temperature hot enough to auto-ignite. If oxygen is then re-introduced to the compartment, e.g. by opening a door or window to a closed room, while the gasses are still hot enough to auto-ignite, combustion will restart, often abruptly or even explosively, as the gasses are heated by the combustion and expand rapidly because of the rapidly increasing temperature, combined with the energy released from combustion.

The colour and movement of smoke is used by firefighters to infer fire conditions, including the risk of backdraft. Characteristic warning signs of a backdraft include yellow or brown smoke, smoke that exits small holes in puffs (a sort of breathing effect) and is often found around the edges of doors and windows, and windows that appear brown or black when viewed from the exterior due to soot from incomplete combustion. This is an indication that the room lacks enough oxygen to permit oxidation of the soot particles. Firefighters often look to see if there is soot on the inside of windows and in any cracks in the window (caused e.g. by the heat). The windows may also have a slight vibration due to varying pressure within the compartment due to intermittent combustion.

If firefighters discover a room sucking air into itself, for example through a crack, they generally evacuate immediately, because this is a strong indication that a backdraft is imminent. Due to pressure differences, puffs of smoke are sometimes drawn back into the enclosed space from which they emanated, which is how the term backdraft originated.

Backdrafts are very dangerous, often surprising even experienced firefighters. The most common tactic used by firefighters to defuse a potential backdraft is to ventilate a room from its highest point, allowing the heat and smoke to escape without igniting.

Common signs of imminent backdraft include a sudden inrush of air upon creating an opening into a closed compartment, no visible signs of flame in a hot compartment (fire above its upper flammability limit), "pulsing" smoke plumes from openings, and auto-ignition of hot gases at openings as they mix with oxygen in the surrounding air.

== Backdrafts and flashovers ==
ISO 13943 broadly defines flashover as a "transition to a state of total surface involvement in a fire of combustible materials within an enclosure." This definition embraces several different scenarios and includes backdrafts, but there is considerable disagreement about categorizing backdrafts as flashovers. In common usage, the term flashover describes the near-simultaneous ignition of material caused by heat attaining the autoignition temperature of the combustible material and gases in an enclosure. Flashovers according to this narrower definition, i.e. those caused by rising temperatures, would not be considered backdrafts since backdrafts are caused by the introduction of oxygen into an enclosed space with conditions already suitable for ignition, and are thus caused by chemical change.

== In popular culture ==
Backdrafts were publicized by the 1991 movie Backdraft, in which a serial arsonist in Chicago uses them as a means of assassinating conspirators in a scam.

In the film adaptation of Stephen King's 1408, the protagonist Mike Enslin induces one as a last-ditch effort to kill the room.

The term is also used and is the title of a scene in the 2012 video game Root Double: Before Crime * After Days.
