= Flashover =

Rapid ignition of combustible material in an enclosed area

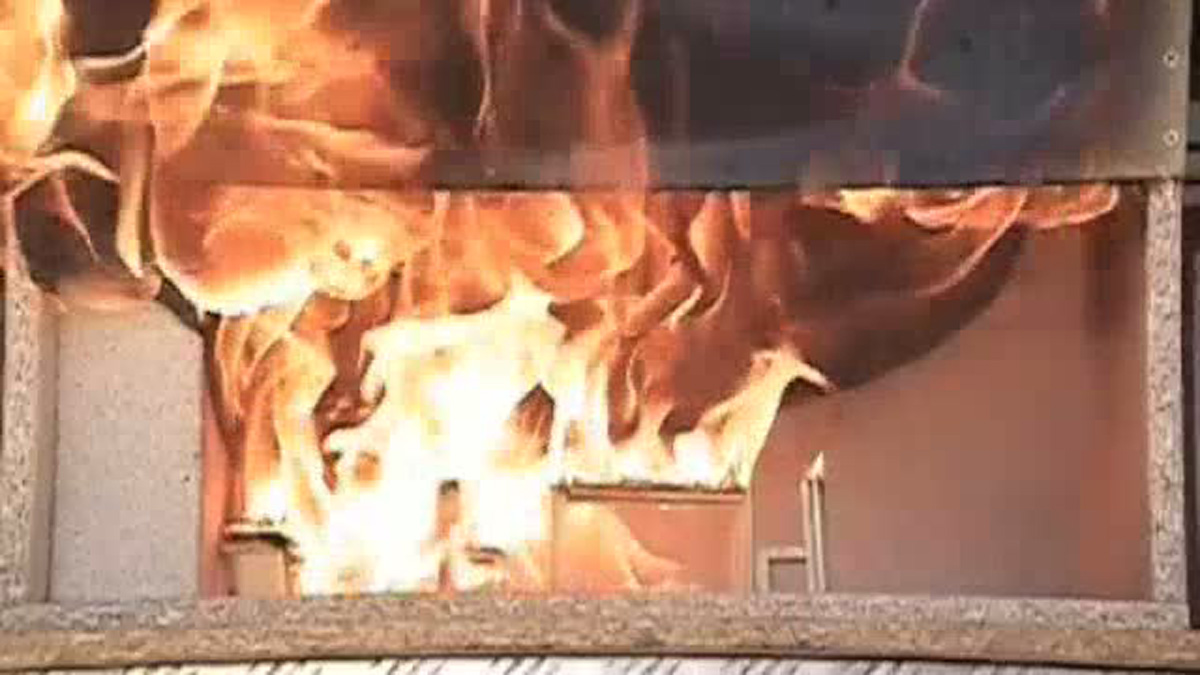
Simulation of a flashover event in a controlled environment

A flashover is the near-simultaneous ignition of most of the directly exposed combustible material in an enclosed area. When certain organic materials are heated, they undergo thermal decomposition and release flammable gases. Flashover occurs when the majority of the exposed surfaces in a space are heated to their autoignition temperature and emit flammable gases (see also flash point). A small flame can reach flashover in 3–5 minutes. Flashover normally occurs at between 500 °C (932 °F) and 600 °C (1,112 °F) for ordinary combustibles and an incident heat flux at floor level of 20 kilowatts per square metre (2.5 hp/sq ft).

Flashover typically occurs between the growth stage and fully developed stage of a fire. This phenomenon is caused by various heat transfer mechanisms such as radiation, convection, and conduction, which lead to a sudden increase of temperature within the compartment.

An example of flashover is the ignition of a piece of furniture in a domestic room. The fire involving the initial piece of furniture can produce a layer of hot smoke, which spreads across the ceiling in the room. The hot buoyant smoke layer grows in depth, as it is bounded by the walls of the room. The radiated heat from this layer heats the surfaces of the directly exposed combustible materials in the room, causing them to give off flammable gases, via pyrolysis. When the temperatures of the evolved gases become high enough, these gases will ignite throughout their extent.

== Types ==
- A lean flashover (sometimes called rollover) is the ignition of the gas layer under the ceiling, leading to total involvement of the compartment. The air–fuel ratio is at the bottom region of the flammability range (i.e., lean).
- A rich flashover occurs when the flammable gases are ignited while at the upper region of the flammability range (i.e., rich). This can happen in rooms where the fire subsided because of lack of oxygen. The ignition source can be a smouldering object, or the stirring up of embers by the air track. Such an event is known as backdraft.
- A delayed flashover occurs when the colder gray smoke cloud ignites after congregating outside of its room of origin. This results in a volatile situation, and if the ignition occurs at the ideal mixture, the result can be a violent smoke gas explosion. This is referred to as smoke explosion or fire gas ignition depending on the severity of the combustion process.
- A hot rich flashover occurs when the hot smoke with flammable gas ratio above the upper limit of flammability range and temperature higher than the ignition temperature leaves the compartment. Upon dilution with air it can spontaneously ignite, and the resultant flame can propagate back into the compartment, resulting in an event similar to a rich flashover. The common definition of this process is known as auto-ignition, which is another form of fire gas ignition.

== Dangers ==
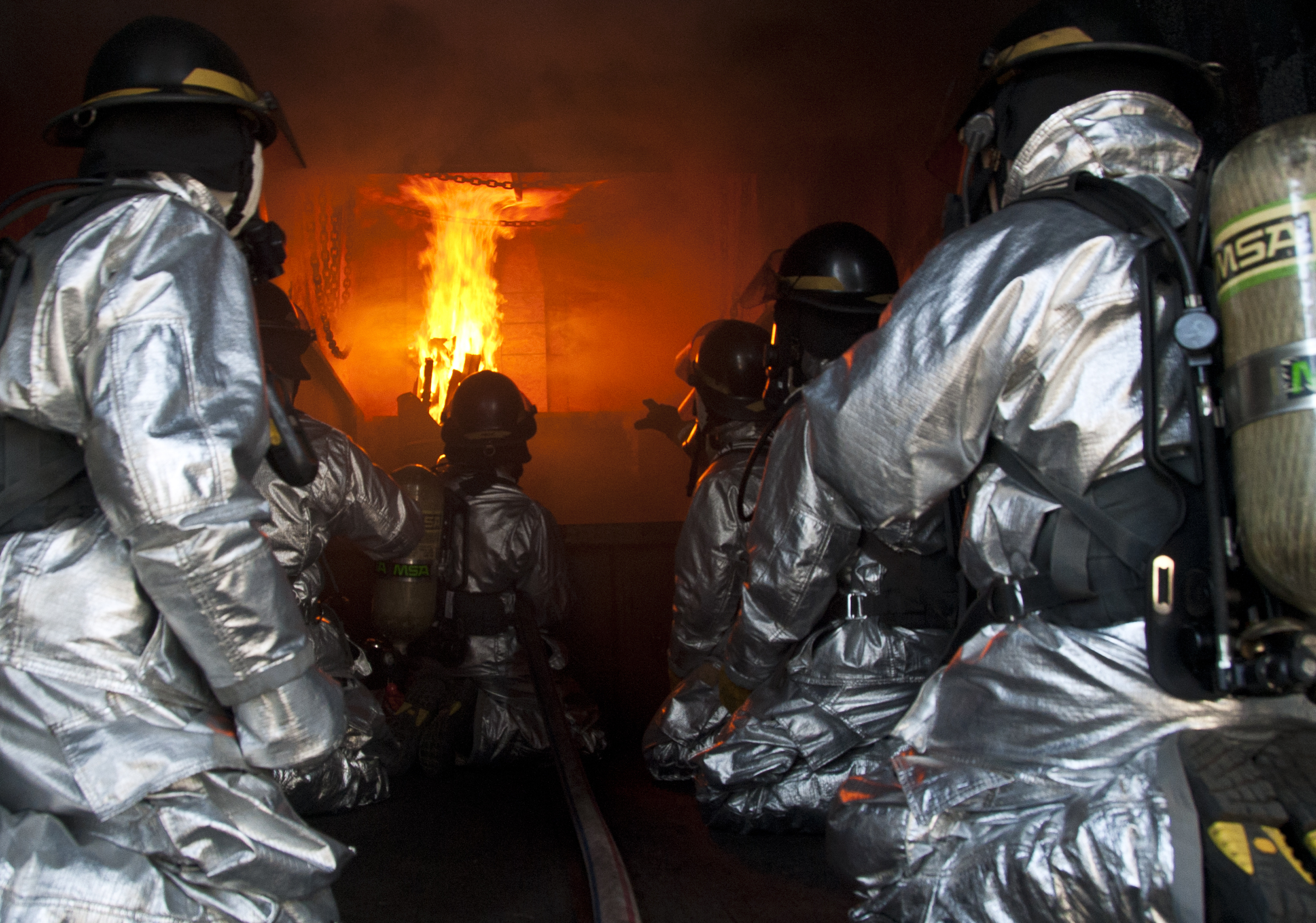
Firefighters perform flashover training to enhance their understanding and response skills

Flashover is one of the most feared phenomenon among firefighters. Firefighters have roughly 7–10 seconds to escape a flashover before PPE fails, resulting in serious injury or more likely death. Firefighters are taught to recognize the signs of imminent rollovers and flashovers and to avoid backdrafts. For example, there are certain routines for opening closed doors to buildings and compartments on fire, known as door entry procedures, ensuring fire crew safety where possible.

== Indicators ==
Firefighters are trained to recognize the signs that a flashover may be imminent. Some common indicators may include

- Thick, dark, turbulent smoke.
- The neutral plane is moving down towards the floor. In this situation, a flashover is plausible.
- All directly exposed combustible materials are showing signs of pyrolysis.
- "Rollover" or tongues of fire appear as gases reach their auto-ignition temperatures.
- There is a rapid build-up (or "spike") in temperature due to the compound effect of rapidly burning (i.e., deflagrating) gases and the thermal cycle they produce. This is generally the best indication of a flashover.
- The fire is in a ventilated compartment, so there is no shortage of oxygen in the room.

A sudden increase in temperature is often the most reliable sign of flashover.

Firefighters memorize a chant to help remember these during training: "Thick dark smoke, high heat, rollover, free burning."

The color of the smoke is often considered as well, but there is no connection between the color of the smoke and the risk of flashovers. Traditionally, black, dense smoke was considered particularly dangerous, but history shows this to be an unreliable indicator. For example, a fire that occurred in a rubber mattress factory in London in 1975 produced white smoke and was not considered dangerous, so firefighters decided to ventilate, which caused a smoke explosion and killed two firefighters. The white smoke from the pyrolysis of the rubber turned out to be extremely flammable.

== Flashover prevention ==
Prevention of flashover is a crucial objective for successful fire attack. Application of water to the ceiling where the hottest gases are, coordinated ventilation, situational awareness, and understanding building construction play a very large role in preventing flashover.

== Flashover vs. backdraft ==
Flashover and backdraft are two very distinct phenomena that occur on the fire ground. However they are often confused. Flashover is heat driven, causing violent results when conditions are reached. Backdraft is oxygen driven, happening when an influx of oxygen is rapidly introduced to a oxygen depleted environment with unburned super heated gases, resulting in a violent explosion.

== Examples ==
During the 1942 Cocoanut Grove fire in Boston, Massachusetts, which resulted in 492 fatalities, a sudden flashover occurred when superheated flammable gases, trapped in enclosed ceiling spaces, spontaneously ignited and raced through the nightclub.

Several tragic flashovers have occurred in history, including the Luoyang Christmas fire in China in 2000, which claimed 309 lives; the Beverly Hills Supper Club fire in Southgate, Kentucky in 1977, resulting in 165 fatalities; and the Dupont Plaza Hotel arson in San Juan, Puerto Rico, on New Year's Eve in December 1986, which killed 98 people. On Valentine’s night in 1981, 48 young people lost their lives in a fire at the Stardust Nightclub in Artane, Dublin. A flashover during a New Year's Eve fire at a bar in Crans-Montana, Switzerland, in 2026, resulted in 41 fatalities.

On June 2nd 1983, Air Canada Flight 797 suffered an in-flight fire while flying from Dallas to Toronto. After making an emergency landing at Cincinnati/Northern Kentucky International Airport, a flashover engulfed the interior of the McDonnell Douglas DC-9, resulting in the deaths of 23 passengers.

During the 2003 Station Nightclub fire in West Warwick, Rhode Island, which resulted in the loss of 100 lives, flashover conditions occurred approximately 90 seconds after ignition.

According to Brian Meacham, a fire safety engineering professor at Lund University in Sweden, "Almost every year, somewhere in the world, a major nightclub fire leads to significant loss of life due to a combination of factors: the presence of combustible sound insulation, tightly packed spaces, inadequate egress routes, and the lack of sprinkler systems."

== See also ==
- Air Canada Flight 797
- Burning of Parliament (1834; flashover seen 20 miles (32 km) away)
- Charleston Sofa Super Store fire
- Firestorm
- Kilbirnie Street fire (1972)
- King's Cross fire (1987; flashover happened in escalator shaft)
- MGM Grand fire (1980)
- Saudia Flight 163
- Stardust fire (1981)
- Ufa train disaster (1989; caused by massive gas leak in the open air, triggered by sparks from trains' brakes)
- 2026 Crans-Montana bar fire (2026)
