= Ventilation (firefighting) =

Firefighting tactic

Ventilation is a part of structural firefighting tactics, and involves the release or expulsion of heat and smoke from a burning building, permitting the firefighters to more easily and safely find trapped individuals and attack the fire. It is frequently performed from the outside of a burning building while the fire is being extinguished on the inside. If a large fire is not properly ventilated, it is much harder to fight, and can build up enough poorly burned smoke to create a smoke explosion or enough heat to create a flashover. Poorly placed or timed ventilation can increase the fire's air supply, causing it to grow and spread rapidly. Flashover from inadequate ventilation can cause the temperature inside the building to peak at over 1,000 °C (1,830 °F).

== Types of ventilation ==
In general, there are two types of ventilation; vertical and horizontal. Their names refer to the general locations of the intended exit points of the heat and smoke to be ventilated. Vertical ventilation takes place through holes cut in the roof, typically by truck companies during the early stages of a fire in a process known collectively as roof operations, while horizontal ventilation usually takes place through doors and windows. The goal of each is to clear heat and smoke to increase chances of survival for trapped occupants, and/or so that water lines can be advanced into the structure, to more effectively battle the flames. While their goals are similar, their applications are different; both require good timing and coordination so that increased air flow through a structure doesn't contribute to fire spread.

== Methods ==
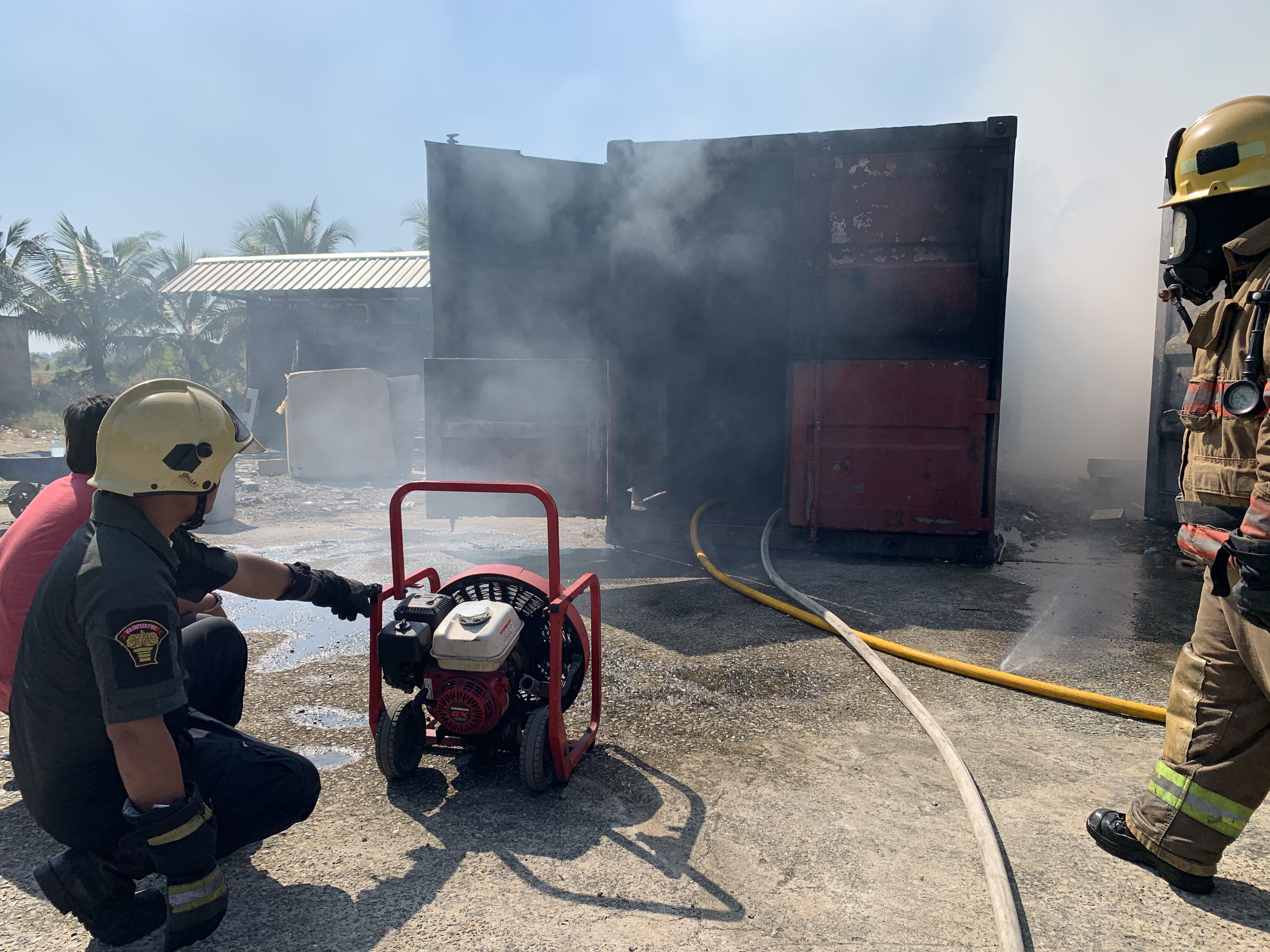
Positive pressure fan

Mechanical fans can be used to provide positive pressure ventilation by breaking or removing windows, skylights or heat/smoke vents on the roof; or by cutting new exhaust vents in the building. If there is no suitable existing hole, firefighters may use their equipment to make one, such as specialized saws for cutting a large hole in the roof. A conical hose-stream aimed around an opening—of a window or door, etc.—entrains smoke and thus increases the exhaust rate of smoke from the space. This is a process called hydraulic ventilation. This strategy might be used when the fire is small and protecting property from smoke damage can be achieved safely. It can also be used more aggressively when a structure is "fully involved" and the smoke is obstructing the nozzleman's view of the hotspots.

High-rise buildings sometimes also incorporate fans to produce a positive pressure in stairwells and elevator shafts to reduce smoke infiltration into those spaces.

When glass windows in a burning structure burst from internal pressure and heat, or the fire burns through the roof, it may be said to have "auto-ventilated" or "self-ventilated."

Negative pressure ventilation is another method of ventilation sometimes used in firefighting efforts. The method of negative pressure ventilation is a process of using smoke ejectors to remove the smoke from a building. Negative pressure ventilation is not used as much as positive pressure ventilation for the reason that positive pressure can move more air throughout the structure and clear out more smoke in a timely manner.

Hydraulic ventilation is another method of ventilation that is very useful if vertical ventilation or positive pressure ventilation is either unsafe or not a feasible strategy. Hydraulic ventilation is done by setting up a hose line on a fog stream and directing it out a window. The air that a fog stream draws in also draws out the smoke and ejects it outside. This method can be useful during overhaul operations as long as there is another hose line in place in the immediate area.

== See also ==
- Glossary of firefighting
