= Canadian Folk Music Award for Ensemble of the Year =

Annual music award

The Canadian Folk Music Award for Ensemble of the Year is a Canadian award, presented as part of the Canadian Folk Music Awards to honour the year's best work by duos and bands in Canadian folk music and related genres. Albums officially credited to solo artists can be nominated for the award, in consideration of the collective work by all musicians participating in the recording.

== 2000s ==
Year	Nominee	Album	Ref
2005; 1st Canadian Folk Music Awards
2005; 1st Canadian Folk Music Awards	Genticorum	Malins plaisirs	
2005; 1st Canadian Folk Music Awards	The Bills	Let 'Em Run	
2005; 1st Canadian Folk Music Awards	The Clumsy Lovers	Smart Kid	
2005; 1st Canadian Folk Music Awards	Nathan	Jimson Weed	
2005; 1st Canadian Folk Music Awards	Le Vent du Nord	Les Amants du Saint-Laurent	
2006; 2nd Canadian Folk Music Awards
2006; 2nd Canadian Folk Music Awards	Mauvais Sort	Koru	
2006; 2nd Canadian Folk Music Awards	Bebop Cowboys	Canadian Dance Hall	
2006; 2nd Canadian Folk Music Awards	The McDades	Bloom	
2006; 2nd Canadian Folk Music Awards	Polémil Bazar	Avale ta montre	
2006; 2nd Canadian Folk Music Awards	Tandava	Tandava	
2007; 3rd Canadian Folk Music Awards
2007; 3rd Canadian Folk Music Awards	Les Charbonniers de l'enfer	À la grâce de Dieu	
2007; 3rd Canadian Folk Music Awards	Creaking Tree String Quartet	The Soundtrack	
2007; 3rd Canadian Folk Music Awards	The Duhks	Migrations	
2007; 3rd Canadian Folk Music Awards	Harry Manx and Kevin Breit	In Good We Trust	
2007; 3rd Canadian Folk Music Awards	John Reichman and The Jaybirds	Stellar Jays	
2008; 4th Canadian Folk Music Awards
2008; 4th Canadian Folk Music Awards	Yves Lambert et Le Bébert Orchestra	Le Monde à Lambert	
2008; 4th Canadian Folk Music Awards	Rita Chiarelli	Uptown Goes Downtown	
2008; 4th Canadian Folk Music Awards	Foggy Hogtown Boys	The Golden West	
2008; 4th Canadian Folk Music Awards	Hungry Hill	Ride	
2008; 4th Canadian Folk Music Awards	Le Vent du Nord	Dans les airs	
2009; 5th Canadian Folk Music Awards
2009; 5th Canadian Folk Music Awards	The Deep Dark Woods	Winter Hours	
2009; 5th Canadian Folk Music Awards	Annie Lou	Annie Lou	
2009; 5th Canadian Folk Music Awards	The Haints Old Time Stringband	Shout Monah	
2009; 5th Canadian Folk Music Awards	Oktoécho	Oktoécho	
2009; 5th Canadian Folk Music Awards	Sultans of String	Yalla Yalla!	

== 2010s ==
Year	Nominee	Album	Ref
2010; 6th Canadian Folk Music Awards
2010; 6th Canadian Folk Music Awards	Le Vent du Nord	La Part du feu	
2010; 6th Canadian Folk Music Awards	Beyond the Pale	Postcards	
2010; 6th Canadian Folk Music Awards	Nicolas Pellerin	et les Grands Hurleurs	
2010; 6th Canadian Folk Music Awards	The Sojourners	The Sojourners	
2010; 6th Canadian Folk Music Awards	Les Tireux d'Roches	Les Tireux d'Roches Cé qu'essé?	
2011; 7th Canadian Folk Music Awards
2011; 7th Canadian Folk Music Awards	Genticorum	Nagez rameurs	
2011; 7th Canadian Folk Music Awards	Creaking Tree String Quartet	Sundogs	
2011; 7th Canadian Folk Music Awards	Harry Manx and Kevin Breit	Strictly Whatever	
2011; 7th Canadian Folk Music Awards	Maz	Télescope	
2011; 7th Canadian Folk Music Awards	The Wailin' Jennys	Bright Morning Stars	
2012; 8th Canadian Folk Music Awards
2012; 8th Canadian Folk Music Awards	The Fretless	Waterbound	
2012; 8th Canadian Folk Music Awards	La Bottine Souriante	Appellation d'origine côntrolée	
2012; 8th Canadian Folk Music Awards	Oliver Schroer and Nuala Kennedy	Enthralled	
2012; 8th Canadian Folk Music Awards	Le Vent du Nord	Tromper le temps	
2012; 8th Canadian Folk Music Awards	Whitehorse	Whitehorse	
2013; 9th Canadian Folk Music Awards
2013; 9th Canadian Folk Music Awards	Good Lovelies	Live at Revolution	
2013; 9th Canadian Folk Music Awards	Genticorum	Enregistré Live	
2013; 9th Canadian Folk Music Awards	Mary Jane Lamond and Wendy MacIsaac	Seinn	
2013; 9th Canadian Folk Music Awards	Corin Raymond and the Sundowners	Paper Nickels	
2013; 9th Canadian Folk Music Awards	Vishtèn	Mosaïk	
2014; 10th Canadian Folk Music Awards
2014; 10th Canadian Folk Music Awards	The Fretless	The Fretless	
2014; 10th Canadian Folk Music Awards	Quinn Bachand	Brishen	
2014; 10th Canadian Folk Music Awards	The High Bar Gang	Lost and Undone: A Gospel Bluegrass Companion	
2014; 10th Canadian Folk Music Awards	Notre Dame de Grass	That's How the Music Begins	
2014; 10th Canadian Folk Music Awards	Ventanas	Ventanas	
2015; 11th Canadian Folk Music Awards
2015; 11th Canadian Folk Music Awards	Big Little Lions	A Little Frayed, a Little Torn	
2015; 11th Canadian Folk Music Awards	The Once	Departures	
2015; 11th Canadian Folk Music Awards	Jayme Stone	Jayme Stone's Lomax Project	
2015; 11th Canadian Folk Music Awards	The Sweet Lowdown	Chasing the Sun	
2015; 11th Canadian Folk Music Awards	Whitehorse	Leave No Bridge Unburned	
2016; 12th Canadian Folk Music Awards
2016; 12th Canadian Folk Music Awards	The East Pointers	Secret Victory	
2016; 12th Canadian Folk Music Awards	Les Frères Berthiaume	Le temps des fêtes est terminé	
2016; 12th Canadian Folk Music Awards	Ten Strings and a Goat Skin	Auprès du poêle	
2016; 12th Canadian Folk Music Awards	Whitehorse	The Northern South, Vol. 1	
2016; 12th Canadian Folk Music Awards	Yves Lambert Trio	Laissez courir les chiens	
2017; 13th Canadian Folk Music Awards
2017; 13th Canadian Folk Music Awards	Mama's Broke	Count the Wicked	
2017; 13th Canadian Folk Music Awards	100 mile house	Hiraeth	
2017; 13th Canadian Folk Music Awards	Cassie and Maggie	The Willow Collection	
2017; 13th Canadian Folk Music Awards	The Jerry Cans	Inuusiq	
2017; 13th Canadian Folk Music Awards	Silent Winters	Fireworks and a Small Brigade	
2018; 14th Canadian Folk Music Awards
2018; 14th Canadian Folk Music Awards	The Lynnes	Heartbreak Song for the Radio	
2018; 14th Canadian Folk Music Awards	The East Pointers	What We Leave Behind	
2018; 14th Canadian Folk Music Awards	The Fretless	Live from the Art Farm	
2018; 14th Canadian Folk Music Awards	Genticorum	Avant l'orage	
2018; 14th Canadian Folk Music Awards	Pharis and Jason Romero	Sweet Old Religion	

== 2020s ==
Year	Nominee	Album	Ref
2020; 15th Canadian Folk Music Awards
2020; 15th Canadian Folk Music Awards	The Small Glories	Assiniboine & The Red	
2020; 15th Canadian Folk Music Awards	Haley Richardson and Quinn Bachand	When the Wind Blows High and Clear	
2020; 15th Canadian Folk Music Awards	Oliver the Crow	Oliver the Crow	
2020; 15th Canadian Folk Music Awards	The Slocan Ramblers	Queen City Jubilee	
2020; 15th Canadian Folk Music Awards	Vishtèn	Horizons	
2021; 16th Canadian Folk Music Awards
2021; 16th Canadian Folk Music Awards	Pharis and Jason Romero	Bet on Love	
2021; 16th Canadian Folk Music Awards	The Dead South	Sugar & Joy	
2021; 16th Canadian Folk Music Awards	OKAN	Sombras	
2021; 16th Canadian Folk Music Awards	Sultans of String	Refuge	
2021; 16th Canadian Folk Music Awards	Sussex	The Ocean Wide	
2022; 17th Canadian Folk Music Awards
2022; 17th Canadian Folk Music Awards	Elliott Brood	Keeper	
2022; 17th Canadian Folk Music Awards	The Fugitives	Trench Songs	
2022; 17th Canadian Folk Music Awards	The Hello Darlins	Go by Feel	
2022; 17th Canadian Folk Music Awards	OKAN	Espiral	
2022; 17th Canadian Folk Music Awards	Whitehorse	Modern Love	
2023; 18th Canadian Folk Music Awards
2023; 18th Canadian Folk Music Awards	The Slocan Ramblers	Up the Hill and Through the Fog	
2023; 18th Canadian Folk Music Awards	The Dead South	Easy Listening for Jerks, Part 1	
2023; 18th Canadian Folk Music Awards	The Fretless	Open House	
2023; 18th Canadian Folk Music Awards	The McDades	The Empress	
2023; 18th Canadian Folk Music Awards	Over the Moon	Chinook Waltz	
2024; 19th Canadian Folk Music Awards
2024; 19th Canadian Folk Music Awards	Genticorum	Au coeur de l'aube	
2024; 19th Canadian Folk Music Awards	The Bombadils	Dear Friend	
2024; 19th Canadian Folk Music Awards	The East Pointers	House of Dreams	
2024; 19th Canadian Folk Music Awards	Jackson Hollow	Roses	
2024; 19th Canadian Folk Music Awards	Whitehorse	I'm Not Crying, You're Crying	
2025; 20th Canadian Folk Music Awards
2025; 20th Canadian Folk Music Awards	Rum Ragged	Gone Jiggin'	
2025; 20th Canadian Folk Music Awards	Rachel Davis and Darren McMullen	Home	
2025; 20th Canadian Folk Music Awards	The Fugitives	No Help Coming	
2025; 20th Canadian Folk Music Awards	The Good Lovelies	We Will Never Be the Same	
2025; 20th Canadian Folk Music Awards	Sultans of String	Walking Through the Fire	
2026; 21st Canadian Folk Music Awards
2026; 21st Canadian Folk Music Awards	Cassie and Maggie	Gold and Coal	
2026; 21st Canadian Folk Music Awards	Boreal	Winterbirds	
2026; 21st Canadian Folk Music Awards	Garçons à Marier	La Dot	
2026; 21st Canadian Folk Music Awards	Jessica Pearson and the East Wind	Live from Motel Chelsea	
2026; 21st Canadian Folk Music Awards	The Southern Residents	Folk Signals	
