= Canadian Folk Music Award for English Songwriter of the Year =

Annual music award

The Canadian Folk Music Award for English Songwriter of the Year is a Canadian award, presented as part of the Canadian Folk Music Awards to honour the year's best songwriting in Canadian folk music. Unlike many songwriting awards, the nomination is given in consideration of all of the songwriting on a whole album rather than singling out individual songs. Awards are also presented for French Songwriter of the Year and Indigenous Songwriter of the Year.

== 2000s ==
Year	Nominee	Album	Ref
2005; 1st Canadian Folk Music Awards
2005; 1st Canadian Folk Music Awards	Lynn Miles	Love Sweet Love	
2005; 1st Canadian Folk Music Awards	Melwood Cutlery	Campfire	
2005; 1st Canadian Folk Music Awards	Connie Kaldor	Sky with Nothing to Get in the Way	
2005; 1st Canadian Folk Music Awards	James Keelaghan	Then Again	
2005; 1st Canadian Folk Music Awards	Joel Plaskett	La De Da	
2006; 2nd Canadian Folk Music Awards
2006; 2nd Canadian Folk Music Awards	Stephen Fearing	Yellowjacket	
2006; 2nd Canadian Folk Music Awards	Lennie Gallant	When We Get There	
2006; 2nd Canadian Folk Music Awards	Ron Hynes	Ron Hynes	
2006; 2nd Canadian Folk Music Awards	Romi Mayes	Sweet Somethin' Steady	
2006; 2nd Canadian Folk Music Awards	Sarah Noni Metzner	Daybreak Mourning	
2007; 3rd Canadian Folk Music Awards
2007; 3rd Canadian Folk Music Awards	Suzie Ungerleider	Short Stories	
2007; 3rd Canadian Folk Music Awards	Jon Brooks	Ours and the Shepherds	
2007; 3rd Canadian Folk Music Awards	Bruce Cockburn	Life Short Call Now	
2007; 3rd Canadian Folk Music Awards	David Francey	Right of Passage	
2007; 3rd Canadian Folk Music Awards	Emm Gryner	The Summer of High Hopes	
2007; 3rd Canadian Folk Music Awards	Keri Latimer, Shelley Marshall	Key Principles	
2008; 4th Canadian Folk Music Awards
2008; 4th Canadian Folk Music Awards	Corb Lund	Horse Soldier! Horse Soldier!	
2008; 4th Canadian Folk Music Awards	Tim Hus	Bush Pilot Buckaroo	
2008; 4th Canadian Folk Music Awards	Lindsay Jane	Lovers Find Reasons	
2008; 4th Canadian Folk Music Awards	Wyckham Porteous	3AM	
2008; 4th Canadian Folk Music Awards	Garnet Rogers	Get a Witness	
2009; 5th Canadian Folk Music Awards
2009; 5th Canadian Folk Music Awards	Susan Crowe	Greytown	
2009; 5th Canadian Folk Music Awards	Jon Brooks	Moth Nor Rust	
2009; 5th Canadian Folk Music Awards	William Hawkins	Dancing Alone: Songs by William Hawkins	
2009; 5th Canadian Folk Music Awards	Rob Heath	One More Day Above Ground	
2009; 5th Canadian Folk Music Awards	Rob Lutes	Truth & Fiction	

== 2010s ==
Year	Nominee	Album	Ref
2010; 6th Canadian Folk Music Awards
2010; 6th Canadian Folk Music Awards	Ian Tamblyn	Gyre	
2010; 6th Canadian Folk Music Awards	Amelia Curran	Hunter, Hunter	
2010; 6th Canadian Folk Music Awards	Lennie Gallant	If We Had A Fire / Le coeur hante	
2010; 6th Canadian Folk Music Awards	Chris MacLean	Feet Be Still	
2010; 6th Canadian Folk Music Awards	Justin Rutledge	The Early Widows	
2011; 7th Canadian Folk Music Awards
2011; 7th Canadian Folk Music Awards	Lynn Miles	Fall for Beauty	
2011; 7th Canadian Folk Music Awards	Bruce Cockburn	Small Source of Comfort	
2011; 7th Canadian Folk Music Awards	David Francey	Late Edition	
2011; 7th Canadian Folk Music Awards	Ron Hynes	Stealing Genius	
2011; 7th Canadian Folk Music Awards	Mae Moore	Folklore	
2012; 8th Canadian Folk Music Awards
2012; 8th Canadian Folk Music Awards	Catherine MacLellan	Silhouette	
2012; 8th Canadian Folk Music Awards	Annie Lou	Grandma's Rules for Drinking	
2012; 8th Canadian Folk Music Awards	Jon Brooks	Delicate Cages	
2012; 8th Canadian Folk Music Awards	Dala	Best Day	
2012; 8th Canadian Folk Music Awards	The Deep Dark Woods	The Place I Left Behind	
2012; 8th Canadian Folk Music Awards	Pear	Sweet 'n Gritty	
2013; 9th Canadian Folk Music Awards
2013; 9th Canadian Folk Music Awards	David Francey	So Say We All	
2013; 9th Canadian Folk Music Awards	John Wort Hannam	Brambles and Thorns	
2013; 9th Canadian Folk Music Awards	Old Man Luedecke	Tender Is the Night	
2013; 9th Canadian Folk Music Awards	Lynn Miles	Downpour	
2013; 9th Canadian Folk Music Awards	Justin Rutledge	Valleyheart	
2014; 10th Canadian Folk Music Awards
2014; 10th Canadian Folk Music Awards	Shari Ulrich	Everywhere I Go	
2014; 10th Canadian Folk Music Awards	Del Barber	Prairieography	
2014; 10th Canadian Folk Music Awards	James Keelaghan	History	
2014; 10th Canadian Folk Music Awards	Lennie Gallant	Live Acoustic at the Carleton	
2014; 10th Canadian Folk Music Awards	Chris Ronald	Timeline	
2015; 11th Canadian Folk Music Awards
2015; 11th Canadian Folk Music Awards	Amelia Curran	They Promised You Mercy	
2015; 11th Canadian Folk Music Awards	Catherine Allan, Andrew James O'Brien	The Bliss — Fortunate Ones	
2015; 11th Canadian Folk Music Awards	Jon Brooks	The Smiling and Beautiful Countryside	
2015; 11th Canadian Folk Music Awards	Luke Doucet, Melissa McClelland	Leave No Bridge Unburned	
2015; 11th Canadian Folk Music Awards	Jenn Grant	Compostela	
2016; 12th Canadian Folk Music Awards
2016; 12th Canadian Folk Music Awards	Donovan Woods	Hard Settle, Ain't Troubled	
2016; 12th Canadian Folk Music Awards	Cara Luft, J. D. Edwards	Wondrous Traveler — The Small Glories	
2016; 12th Canadian Folk Music Awards	Danny Michel	Matadora	
2016; 12th Canadian Folk Music Awards	The Strumbellas	Hope	
2016; 12th Canadian Folk Music Awards	Royal Wood	Ghost Light	
2017; 13th Canadian Folk Music Awards
2017; 13th Canadian Folk Music Awards	Ken Yates	Huntsville	
2017; 13th Canadian Folk Music Awards	Scott Cook	Further Down the Line	
2017; 13th Canadian Folk Music Awards	Amelia Curran	Watershed	
2017; 13th Canadian Folk Music Awards	Stephen Fearing	Every Soul's a Sailor	
2017; 13th Canadian Folk Music Awards	Oh Susanna	A Girl in Teen City	
2018; 14th Canadian Folk Music Awards
2018; 14th Canadian Folk Music Awards	Lynne Hanson, Lynn Miles	Heartbreak Song for the Radio — The Lynnes	
2018; 14th Canadian Folk Music Awards	Noosa Al-Sarraj	Wasted Time	
2018; 14th Canadian Folk Music Awards	Bruce Cockburn	Bone on Bone	
2018; 14th Canadian Folk Music Awards	Dana Sipos	Trick of the Light	
2018; 14th Canadian Folk Music Awards	Donovan Woods	Both Ways	

== 2020s ==
Year	Nominee	Album	Ref
2020; 15th Canadian Folk Music Awards
2020; 15th Canadian Folk Music Awards	Abigail Lapell	Getaway	
2020; 15th Canadian Folk Music Awards	Ben Caplan, Christian Barry	Old Stock	
2020; 15th Canadian Folk Music Awards	Lennie Gallant	Time Travel	
2020; 15th Canadian Folk Music Awards	Dave Gunning	Up Against the Sky	
2020; 15th Canadian Folk Music Awards	Kaia Kater	Grenades	
2020; 15th Canadian Folk Music Awards	Cara Luft, J. D. Edwards, Neil Osborne, Catherine MacLellan	Assiniboine & The Red — The Small Glories	
2020; 15th Canadian Folk Music Awards	Madeleine Roger	Cottonwood	
2020; 15th Canadian Folk Music Awards	Justin Rutledge	Passages	
2021; 16th Canadian Folk Music Awards
2021; 16th Canadian Folk Music Awards	William Prince	Reliever	
2021; 16th Canadian Folk Music Awards	Coco Love Alcorn	Rebirth	
2021; 16th Canadian Folk Music Awards	Basia Bulat	Are You in Love?	
2021; 16th Canadian Folk Music Awards	Pharis and Jason Romero	Bet on Love	
2021; 16th Canadian Folk Music Awards	Sarah Jane Scouten	Confessions	
2021; 16th Canadian Folk Music Awards	Julian Taylor	The Ridge	
2022; 17th Canadian Folk Music Awards
2022; 17th Canadian Folk Music Awards	Allison Russell	Outside Child	
2022; 17th Canadian Folk Music Awards	Scott Cook	Tangle of Souls	
2022; 17th Canadian Folk Music Awards	Rick Fines	Solar Powered Too	
2022; 17th Canadian Folk Music Awards	Rob Lutes	Come Around	
2022; 17th Canadian Folk Music Awards	Noah Reid	Gemini	
2022; 17th Canadian Folk Music Awards	Ian Tamblyn	A Longing for Innocence	
2023; 18th Canadian Folk Music Awards
2023; 18th Canadian Folk Music Awards	Abigail Lapell	Stolen Time	
2023; 18th Canadian Folk Music Awards	T. Buckley	Frame by Frame	
2023; 18th Canadian Folk Music Awards	John Wort Hannam	Long Haul	
2023; 18th Canadian Folk Music Awards	Li'l Andy	The Complete Recordings of Hezekiah Procter (1925–1930)	
2023; 18th Canadian Folk Music Awards	Matt Patershuk	An Honest Effort	
2023; 18th Canadian Folk Music Awards	Yael Wand	Saltwater Heartwood	
2024; 19th Canadian Folk Music Awards
2024; 19th Canadian Folk Music Awards	Jacob Brodovsky	I Love You and I'm Sorry	
2024; 19th Canadian Folk Music Awards	Tim Chaisson, Koady Chaisson, Jake Charron, Colin MacDonald, Carleton Stone	House of Dreams	
2024; 19th Canadian Folk Music Awards	Noah Derksen	Sanctity of Silence	
2024; 19th Canadian Folk Music Awards	Luke Doucet, Melissa McClelland	I'm Not Crying, You're Crying	
2024; 19th Canadian Folk Music Awards	Dave Gunning	The Same Storm	
2024; 19th Canadian Folk Music Awards	Noah Zacharin	Points of Light	
2025; 20th Canadian Folk Music Awards
2025; 20th Canadian Folk Music Awards	Ruth Moody	Wanderer	
2025; 20th Canadian Folk Music Awards	Celeigh Cardinal, Brennan Cameron	Boundless Possibilities	
2025; 20th Canadian Folk Music Awards	Adrian Glynn, Brendan McLeod (The Fugitives)	No Help Coming	
2025; 20th Canadian Folk Music Awards	Shaina Hayes	Kindergarten Heart	
2025; 20th Canadian Folk Music Awards	Kellie Loder	Transitions	
2025; 20th Canadian Folk Music Awards	Ndidi Onukwulu	Simple Songs for Complicated Times	
2026; 21st Canadian Folk Music Awards
2026; 21st Canadian Folk Music Awards	Terra Spencer	Sunset	
2026; 21st Canadian Folk Music Awards	AHI	The Light Behind the Sun	
2026; 21st Canadian Folk Music Awards	Mia Kelly	To Be Clear	
2026; 21st Canadian Folk Music Awards	Shane Pendergast	Winter Grace	
2026; 21st Canadian Folk Music Awards	Suzie Ungerleider	Among the Evergreens	
