= Canadian Folk Music Award for Children's Album of the Year =

Annual music award

The Canadian Folk Music Award for Children's Album of the Year is a Canadian award, presented as part of the Canadian Folk Music Awards to honour the year's best children's music.

== 2000s ==
Year	Nominee	Album	Ref
2005; 1st Canadian Folk Music Awards
2005; 1st Canadian Folk Music Awards	No award presented		
2006; 2nd Canadian Folk Music Awards
2006; 2nd Canadian Folk Music Awards	Ken Whiteley	Join the Band	
2006; 2nd Canadian Folk Music Awards	Connie Kaldor	A Poodle in Paris	
2006; 2nd Canadian Folk Music Awards	Kathy Reid-Naiman	Reaching for the Stars	
2006; 2nd Canadian Folk Music Awards	Rick Scott	Snooze Music	
2006; 2nd Canadian Folk Music Awards	Various Artists	Le petit chien de laine	
2007; 3rd Canadian Folk Music Awards
2007; 3rd Canadian Folk Music Awards	Pied Pumkin	Pumkids: Tuneful Tales for Kids & Kin	
2007; 3rd Canadian Folk Music Awards	Geneviève Bilodeau, Connie Kaldor	Un Canard à New York	
2007; 3rd Canadian Folk Music Awards	Debbie Carroll	Simply Beautiful	
2007; 3rd Canadian Folk Music Awards	Alex Mahé	Wakin' Up the Sunshine	
2007; 3rd Canadian Folk Music Awards	Laura Vinson & Free Spirit	Mossbag Lullaby	
2008; 4th Canadian Folk Music Awards
2008; 4th Canadian Folk Music Awards	The Kerplunks	The Kerplunks	
2008; 4th Canadian Folk Music Awards	Rik Barron	Shine	
2008; 4th Canadian Folk Music Awards	Celtic Rathskallions	All Around the Circle	
2008; 4th Canadian Folk Music Awards	Funky Mamas	Rollin' Along	
2008; 4th Canadian Folk Music Awards	Art Napoleon	Mocikan: Songs for Learning Cree	
2009; 5th Canadian Folk Music Awards
2009; 5th Canadian Folk Music Awards	Chris McKhool	FiddleFire!	
2009; 5th Canadian Folk Music Awards	Maggie G.	Around The House With Maggie G.	
2009; 5th Canadian Folk Music Awards	The Kerplunks	Walk On	
2009; 5th Canadian Folk Music Awards	Tasha Platt	Big Bad Bantam Rooster	
2009; 5th Canadian Folk Music Awards	Kathy Reid-Naiman	Zoom Zoom Cuddle and Croon	

== 2010s ==
Year	Nominee	Album	Ref
2010; 6th Canadian Folk Music Awards
2010; 6th Canadian Folk Music Awards	Andrew Queen	Too Tall	
2010; 6th Canadian Folk Music Awards	The Kerplunks	Number 3	
2010; 6th Canadian Folk Music Awards	Madame Diva	Madame Diva	
2010; 6th Canadian Folk Music Awards	Peter Puffin's Whale Tales	Proud Like a Mountain	
2010; 6th Canadian Folk Music Awards	Kathy Reid-Naiman	Sing the Cold Winter Away	
2011; 7th Canadian Folk Music Awards
2011; 7th Canadian Folk Music Awards	Benoît Archambault	Les pourquoi	
2011; 7th Canadian Folk Music Awards	Kathy Reid-Naiman	I Love to Hear the Sounds	
2011; 7th Canadian Folk Music Awards	Colleen Power, Crooked Stovepipe	For Little Ones	
2011; 7th Canadian Folk Music Awards	Will Stroet	Walk 'n' Roll	
2011; 7th Canadian Folk Music Awards	Marky Weinstock	Songs for Dreamers	
2012; 8th Canadian Folk Music Awards
2012; 8th Canadian Folk Music Awards	Henri Godon	Chansons pour toutes sortes d'enfants	
2012; 8th Canadian Folk Music Awards	Andrew Queen	GROW	
2012; 8th Canadian Folk Music Awards	Kathy Reid-Naiman, Hannah Shira Naiman	Here We Go Zodeo	
2012; 8th Canadian Folk Music Awards	Shelley Bean and the Duckety Muds	Shelley Bean and the Duckety Muds	
2012; 8th Canadian Folk Music Awards	Will Stroet	Ensemble, en cadence	
2013; 9th Canadian Folk Music Awards
2013; 9th Canadian Folk Music Awards	Helen Austin	Always Be a Unicorn	
2013; 9th Canadian Folk Music Awards	The Funky Mamas	Pickin' in the Garden	
2013; 9th Canadian Folk Music Awards	Jennifer Gasoi	Throw a Penny in the Wishing Well	
2013; 9th Canadian Folk Music Awards	Madame Diva	Viva la Diva	
2013; 9th Canadian Folk Music Awards	Gary Rasberry	What's the Big Idea?!?	
2014; 10th Canadian Folk Music Awards
2014; 10th Canadian Folk Music Awards	Fred Penner	Where In The World	
2014; 10th Canadian Folk Music Awards	Helen Austin	Colour It	
2014; 10th Canadian Folk Music Awards	Alex Mahé	Réveillons les bonnes chansons	
2014; 10th Canadian Folk Music Awards	Rattle and Strum	Rattle and Strum	
2014; 10th Canadian Folk Music Awards	Kathy Reid-Naiman	When It's Autumn	
2015; 11th Canadian Folk Music Awards
2015; 11th Canadian Folk Music Awards	The Swinging Belles	More Sheep, Less Sleep	
2015; 11th Canadian Folk Music Awards	Ginalina	Forest Friends' Nature Club Album	
2015; 11th Canadian Folk Music Awards	Henri Godon	La vie rêvée!	
2015; 11th Canadian Folk Music Awards	Hilary Grist	Tomorrow Is a Chance to Start Over	
2015; 11th Canadian Folk Music Awards	Stella Swanson	I'm Not a Bunny	
2016; 12th Canadian Folk Music Awards
2016; 12th Canadian Folk Music Awards	The Kerplunks	Pants & Mammals	
2016; 12th Canadian Folk Music Awards	Nadia Gaudet, Jason Burnstick	Dream Big, Little One / Fais de beaux rêves, petit ange	
2016; 12th Canadian Folk Music Awards	Charlie Hope	Songs, Stories and Friends 2: Where the Path Will Wind	
2016; 12th Canadian Folk Music Awards	Kattam	De Tombouctou à Bombay	
2016; 12th Canadian Folk Music Awards	Kathy Reid-Naiman	Welcome Summer	
2017; 13th Canadian Folk Music Awards
2017; 13th Canadian Folk Music Awards	Fred Penner	Hear the Music	
2017; 13th Canadian Folk Music Awards	Jessie Farrell	Chirp Chirp Happy	
2017; 13th Canadian Folk Music Awards	Ginalina	Home Is Family	
2017; 13th Canadian Folk Music Awards	Madame Diva, Micah le jeune voyageur	Zing-E-Zing!	
2017; 13th Canadian Folk Music Awards	Stella Swanson and the Rosie Joyfuls	Pants on Backwards	
2018; 14th Canadian Folk Music Awards
2018; 14th Canadian Folk Music Awards	Joseph Edgar, Lisa LeBlanc, Robin-Joël Cool, Wanabi Farmeur, Vishtèn, Caroline Savoie, Édith Butler	Grand tintamarre ! - Chansons et comptines acadiennes	
2018; 14th Canadian Folk Music Awards	Jeremy Fisher Junior	Highway to Spell	
2018; 14th Canadian Folk Music Awards	The Oot n' Oots	Electric Jellyfish Boogaloo	
2018; 14th Canadian Folk Music Awards	Splash'N Boots	Love, Kisses and Hugs	
2018; 14th Canadian Folk Music Awards	The Swinging Belles	The Superstar Sibling Detective Agency	

== 2020s ==
Year	Nominee	Album	Ref
2020; 15th Canadian Folk Music Awards
2020; 15th Canadian Folk Music Awards	The Kerplunks	Lullabies for Big Eyes	
2020; 15th Canadian Folk Music Awards	Ginalina	It Takes a Village	
2020; 15th Canadian Folk Music Awards	Amos J, Jérôme Fortin	Magical Lullabies	
2020; 15th Canadian Folk Music Awards	Will's Jams	Rocks and Roots	
2020; 15th Canadian Folk Music Awards	Splash'N Boots	You, Me and the Sea	
2021; 16th Canadian Folk Music Awards
2021; 16th Canadian Folk Music Awards	Claire Ness	Broccoli Farm	
2021; 16th Canadian Folk Music Awards	Spencer Burton	The Mountain Man	
2021; 16th Canadian Folk Music Awards	Ginalina	Small But Mighty	
2021; 16th Canadian Folk Music Awards	Henri Godon	Tous musiciens	
2021; 16th Canadian Folk Music Awards	Charlie Hope	Goodnight to You All	
2022; 17th Canadian Folk Music Awards
2022; 17th Canadian Folk Music Awards	Splash'N Boots	Heart Parade	
2022; 17th Canadian Folk Music Awards	Penny Pom Pom	Believe in Your Magic	
2022; 17th Canadian Folk Music Awards	Peter Puffin's Whale Tales	Campfire Time!	
2022; 17th Canadian Folk Music Awards	Garth Prince	Falling in Africa	
2022; 17th Canadian Folk Music Awards	Remy Rodden	Think About the Wild	
2023; 18th Canadian Folk Music Awards
2023; 18th Canadian Folk Music Awards	Gordie Crazylegs MacKeeman	Folk for Little Folk, Vol. 1	
2023; 18th Canadian Folk Music Awards	My Friend Christopher	Tuba Blues	
2023; 18th Canadian Folk Music Awards	Hannah Shira Naiman	Ça suffit pour s'amuser	
2023; 18th Canadian Folk Music Awards	The Oot n' Oots	Ponderosa Bunchgrass and the Golden Rule	
2023; 18th Canadian Folk Music Awards	The Relative Minors	The Full Circle	
2024; 19th Canadian Folk Music Awards
2024; 19th Canadian Folk Music Awards	Ginalina	Going Back: Remembered and Remixed Family Folk Songs, Vol. 1	
2024; 19th Canadian Folk Music Awards	Darrelle London	Primary	
2024; 19th Canadian Folk Music Awards	Mr. Ben	Here Comes the Train	
2024; 19th Canadian Folk Music Awards	The Relative Minors	Minor Third	
2024; 19th Canadian Folk Music Awards	The Swinging Belles	Welcome to the Flea Circus	
2025; 20th Canadian Folk Music Awards
2025; 20th Canadian Folk Music Awards	Abigail Lapell	Lullabies	
2025; 20th Canadian Folk Music Awards	Bon Débarras	J'm'en viens chez vous!	
2025; 20th Canadian Folk Music Awards	Henri Godon	Chants de vacances	
2025; 20th Canadian Folk Music Awards	Seeka Sings	I Belong	
2025; 20th Canadian Folk Music Awards	Will and Seeka	Will and Seeka: Friends with Everyone	
2026; 21st Canadian Folk Music Awards
2026; 21st Canadian Folk Music Awards	Ginalina	All the Earth Speaks	
2026; 21st Canadian Folk Music Awards	James Culleton	Superfolk	
2026; 21st Canadian Folk Music Awards	Heather Feather	Together	
2026; 21st Canadian Folk Music Awards	Oh Clementine	One Thousand Mornings	
2026; 21st Canadian Folk Music Awards	Marky Weinstock and Friends	Here for You!	
