= 15th Canadian Folk Music Awards =

2020 music awards ceremony

- Country: Canada
- Hosted by: Jean Hewson, Benoit Bourque
- Website: folkawards.ca

The 15th Canadian Folk Music Awards were scheduled to presented on April 3 and 4, 2020 in Charlottetown, Prince Edward Island. This represents the first time in the history of the awards that the organizing committee decided to present the awards in the spring rather than the fall, and thus the first time that the awards have been presented since November 2018. On March 13, however, the organizing committee announced the cancellation of the ceremony due to the emergence of the COVID-19 pandemic in Canada; instead, the winners were announced via live streaming on April 4.

Performers were scheduled to include Vishtèn, Kaia Kater, Ayrad, Tri-Continental, Lennie Gallant, Abigail Lapell and Le Vent du Nord.

Nominations were announced on November 20, 2019.

== Nominees and recipients ==
Recipients are listed first and highlighted in boldface.

Traditional Album	Contemporary Album
**The Slocan Ramblers, Queen City Jubilee**; Old Man Luedecke, Easy Money; Shannon Quinn, Watchmaker; Le Vent du Nord, Territoires; Vishtèn, Horizons	**The Small Glories, Assiniboine & The Red**; Lennie Gallant, Time Travel; Ariana Gillis, The Maze; Jenn Grant, Love, Inevitable; Dave Gunning, Up Against the Sky; Abigail Lapell, Getaway; Leaf Rapids, Citizen Alien; Various Artists, The Al Purdy Songbook
Children's Album	Traditional Singer
**The Kerplunks, Lullabies for Big Eyes**; Ginalina, It Takes a Village; Amos J and Jérôme Fortin, Magical Lullabies; Will's Jams, Rocks and Roots; Splash'N Boots, You, Me and the Sea	**Rachel Davis (Còig), Ashlar**; Joshua Haulli, Aqqut; Sophie Lavoie (Sophie & Fiachra), Portraits; Old Man Luedecke, Easy Money; Allison Lupton, Words of Love
Contemporary Singer	Instrumental Solo Artist
**Matt Andersen, Halfway Home By Morning**; Jenn Grant, Love, Inevitable; Dave Gunning, Up Against the Sky; Lydia Persaud, Let Me Show You; Andrea Ramolo, Homage	**Sabin Jacques, Grandes Rencontres**; Itamar Erez, Mi Alegria; Graham Lindsey, TradHead; Jon Pilatzke, Amongst Friends; Richard Wood, Unbroken
Instrumental Group	English Songwriter
**Mairi Rankin and Eric Wright, The Cabin Sessions**; Emilyn Stam and Filippo Gambetta, Shorelines; Pierre Schryer and Adam Dobres, Mandorla; The Fitzgeralds, The Fitzgeralds; Toronto Tabla Ensemble, Bhumika	**Abigail Lapell, Getaway**; Ben Caplan and Christian Barry, Old Stock; Lennie Gallant, Time Travel; Dave Gunning, Up Against the Sky; Kaia Kater, Grenades; Cara Luft, J. D. Edwards, Neil Osborne and Catherine MacLellan, Assiniboine & The Red (The Small Glories); Madeleine Roger, Cottonwood; Justin Rutledge, Passages
French Songwriter	Indigenous Songwriter
**Bernard Adamus, C’qui nous reste du Texas**; Jordane Labrie and Clement Desjardins, 12 jours; Jean Leloup, L’étrange pays; Safia Nolin, Dans le noir; Caroline Savoie, Pourchasser l’aube	**Diyet van Lieshout, Diyet & the Love Soldiers**; Sugar Plum Croxen, Shelley Hamilton and George Elliott Clarke, Constitution (The Afro-Métis Nation); Jenelle Duval, Danielle Benoit, Stacey Howse, Qama’si (Eastern Owl); Joshua Haulli, Aqqut; Mike Paul, Origine
Vocal Group	Ensemble
**The Small Glories, Assiniboine & The Red**; Fortunate Ones, Hold Fast; Geneviève et Alain, De la rivière à la mer; Musique à bouches, L’habit de plumes; The Sweet Lowdown, Low Clouds in the Morning	**The Small Glories, Assiniboine & The Red**; Haley Richardson and Quinn Bachand, When the Wind Blows High and Clear; Oliver the Crow, Oliver the Crow; The Slocan Ramblers, Queen City Jubilee; Vishtèn, Horizons
Solo Artist	World Solo Artist
**Irish Mythen, Little Bones**; Michael Jerome Browne, That’s Where It’s At; Jenn Grant, Love, Inevitable; Dave Gunning, Up Against the Sky; Sarah MacDougall, All the Hours I Have Left to Tell You Anything; Danny Michel, White & Gold	**Wesli, Rapadou Kreyol**; Ben Caplan, Old Stock; Cristian De La Luna, SABES; Quique Escamilla, Encomienda; Roberto López, Kaleido Strópico
World Group	New/Emerging Artist
**Ayrad, Zoubida**; Al Qahwa, Cairo Moon; Emilyn Stam and Filippo Gambetta, Shorelines; Pierre Schryer and Adam Dobres, Mandorla; Toronto Tabla Ensemble, Bhumika	**Geneviève Racette, No Water, No Flowers**; Birds of Bellwoods, Victoria; Gordie MacKeeman and His Rhythm Boys, Dreamland; Hook & Nail, Ghosts of Taylorton; Lydia Persaud, Let Me Show You; T. Buckley, Miles We Put Behind; The Lumber Jills, The Lumber Jills; The Unfaithful Servants, The Unfaithful Servants
Producer	Pushing the Boundaries
**Daniel Ledwell, Time Travel (Lennie Gallant)**; Erin Costelo, Grenades (Kaia Kater); Steve Dawson, Halfway Home By Morning (Matt Andersen); Luke Doucet, The Northern South, Vol. 2 (Whitehorse); Jory Nash and Chris Stringer, Wilderness Years (Jory Nash)	**Elisapie, The Ballad of the Runaway Girl**; Ben Caplan, Old Stock; Samson Wrote, Pigeon; Tri-Continental, Dust Dance; Vishtèn, Horizons
Young Performer	Special Awards
**Joshua Haulli, Aqqut**; Conway, Conway; Nick Earle, Breaking New Ground; Keltie, Expect Inhibition; Jacques Surette, Marche, marche, marche	Unsung Hero: Donnie Campbell
