= Diyet van Lieshout =

Canadian singer-songwriter

Diyet van Lieshout is a Canadian singer-songwriter from the Yukon, who has recorded and performed both as a solo artist and with the band Diyet and the Love Soldiers. She is most noted as a Canadian Folk Music Award winner for Indigenous Songwriter of the Year at the 15th Canadian Folk Music Awards.

Of Japanese, Scottish, Tlingit and Southern Tutchone ancestry, she was born and raised in the Kluane Lake region of Yukon, and is a member of the Kluane First Nation. She met her husband Robert van Lieshout, the guitarist in her band, while travelling in Europe.

She released her debut album, The Breaking Point, in 2010, and followed up in 2013 with When You Were King. Diyet and the Love Soldiers, her first album to be credited to the full band rather than solo, was released in 2018, and was promoted in part by her first significant concert dates outside of Yukon.
