= Jacob Brodovsky =

Canadian folk singer-songwriter

Jacob Brodovsky is a Canadian folk singer-songwriter from Winnipeg, Manitoba, most noted as the winner of the Canadian Folk Music Award for English Songwriter of the Year at the 19th Canadian Folk Music Awards in 2024.

Brodovsky previously played in a band called Kakagi, whose members included his brother Max on drums. In 2016 he contacted local singer-songwriters John K. Samson and Christine Fellows, who were at the time serving as writers-in-residence at the Winnipeg Public Library, for feedback on his songwriting, with their guidance reflected in the songs on his 2019 EP Sixteen Years.

His debut full-length album I Love You and I'm Sorry was released in 2022. The album included production contributions by Samson, alongside his former Weakerthans bandmate Jason Tait performing on drums, and sometime Weakerthans collaborator Julie Penner on violin, as well as singer-songwriter Liam Duncan on keyboards.

== Discography ==
- Sixteen Years - 2019
- I Love You and I'm Sorry - 2022
- Tell the Kids We Tried - 2026
