= Joshua Haulli =

Canadian singer-songwriter

Joshua Haulli was a Canadian singer-songwriter from Igloolik, Nunavut, who released his debut album Aqqut in 2019. He received three Canadian Folk Music Award nominations at the 15th Canadian Folk Music Awards, for Traditional Singer of the Year, Indigenous Songwriter of the Year and Young Performer of the Year, winning the award for Young Performer of the Year.

Haulli began writing songs as a teenager, and won the Battle of the Bands competition at Nunavut's Alianait Arts Festival in 2015. In 2017, his song "Angajuqqaat" was a finalist in the Nunavut Department of Culture and Heritage's Qilaut Songwriting Contest. His music is written and performed in the Inuktitut language.

In addition to his music, Haulli operated his own business selling traditional Inuit hunting supplies.
