= Mama's Broke =

Canadian folk music duo

- Mama's Broke performing in Somerville, Massachusetts, 2026

Background information
- Genres: Folk; Bluegrass
- Years active: c. 2016–present
- Award: Canadian Folk Music Award
- Members: Amy Lou Keeler; Lisa Maria

Mama's Broke are a Canadian folk music duo from Halifax, Nova Scotia, consisting of Amy Lou Keeler and Lisa Maria. They are most noted as winners of the Canadian Folk Music Award for Ensemble of the Year at the 13th Canadian Folk Music Awards in 2017 for their debut album Count the Wicked.

Their style draws on bluegrass and Eastern European folk music influences. Maria performs vocals, fiddle, mandolin, banjo, and guitar, and Keeler performs vocals, guitar, banjo, and fiddlesticks.

== History ==
Mama's Broke performing in 2025

Mama's Broke's second album, Narrow Line, was released in 2022, and received a CFMA nomination for Vocal Group of the Year at the 18th Canadian Folk Music Awards and a Juno Award nomination for Traditional Roots Album of the Year at the Juno Awards of 2023.

In 2024, the duo went on tour, including performances in Halifax, Nova Scotia and Bellingham, Washington.

== Discography ==
- Count The Wicked (2017)
- Narrow Line (2022)
- Reunion (2026)
