= 18th Canadian Folk Music Awards =

2023 music awards ceremony

- Date: March 31 – April 2, 2023
- Location: St James Community Square; Vancouver, British Columbia
- Country: Canada
- Hosted by: Chelsey June, Benoît Bourque
- Website: folkawards.ca

The 18th Canadian Folk Music Awards were presented between March 31 and April 2, 2023, to honour achievements in folk music by Canadian artists in 2022. Nominees were announced in October 2022.

== Nominees and recipients ==
| Traditional Album | Contemporary Album |
|---|---|
| Allison de Groot and Tatiana Hargreaves, Hurricane Clarice; Shannon Quinn and Tony Quinn, 20 Summers; The Slocan Ramblers, Up the Hill and Through the Fog; Le Vent du Nord, 20 printemps; Ken Whiteley, Long Time Travelling | John Wort Hannam, Long Haul; Shawna Caspi, Hurricane Coming; Digging Roots, Zhawenim; Madison Violet, eleven; Kyle McKearney, Down-Home; Sultans of String, Sanctuary; Tanya Tagaq, Tongues; Ken Yates, Cerulean |
| Children's Album | Traditional Singer |
| Gordie Crazylegs MacKeeman, Folk for Little Folk, Vol. 1; My Friend Christopher, Tuba Blues; Hannah Shira Naiman, Ça suffit pour s'amuser; The Oot n' Oots, Ponderosa Bunchgrass and the Golden Rule; The Relative Minors, The Full Circle | Lizzy Hoyt, The Parting Glass; Kim Beggs, Steel and Wool; Mike Bravener, Have You Ever Heard the Story?; Michael Darcy, Down to the Roots; Li'l Andy, The Complete Recordings of Hezekiah Procter (1925–1930) |
| Contemporary Singer | Instrumental Solo Artist |
| Kyle McKearney, Down-Home; Barney Bentall, Cosmic Dreamer; Boy Golden, Church of Better Daze; Angelique Francis, Long River; Ken Yates, Cerulean | Waymzy, Inchoate; Kerry Fitzgerald, Bitz & Beatz; Ellen Gibling, The Bend in the Light; John Reischman, New Time & Old Acoustic; Mike Stevens, Breathe in the World Breathe Out Music |
| Instrumental Group | English Songwriter |
| Allison de Groot and Tatiana Hargreaves, Hurricane Clarice; The McDades, The Empress; Proulx-Demers, Il fera beau demain; Shannon Quinn and Tony Quinn, 20 Summers; RanchWriters, RanchWriters | Abigail Lapell, Stolen Time; T. Buckley, Frame by Frame; John Wort Hannam, Long Haul; Li'l Andy, The Complete Recordings of Hezekiah Procter (1925–1930); Matt Patershuk, An Honest Effort; Yael Wand, Saltwater Heartwood |
| French Songwriter | Indigenous Songwriter |
| Geneviève Roberge-Bouchard and Alain Barbeau, J’attends encore; Anik Bérubé and Natalie Byrns, Les ébranlements; Sébastien Lacombe, Le chemin des possibles; Héra Ménard and Guylaine Saint-Pierre, Fleurs; Matt Stern, Rien qu'un animal | Amanda Rheaume, The Spaces in Between; Berk Jodoin, Half Breed; ShoShona Kish and Raven Kanatakta Polson-Lahache, Zhawenim; Kyle McKearney, Down-Home; Adrian Sutherland, When the Magic Hits |
| Vocal Group | Ensemble |
| The McDades, The Empress; Mama's Broke, Narrow Line; Quote the Raven, Can't Hold the Light; Les Rats d'Swompe, Elixir; Le Vent du Nord, 20 printemps | The Slocan Ramblers, Up the Hill and Through the Fog; The Dead South, Easy Listening for Jerks, Part 1; The Fretless, Open House; The McDades, The Empress; Over the Moon, Chinook Waltz |
| Solo Artist | Global Roots Album |
| John Wort Hannam, Long Haul; Barney Bentall, Cosmic Dreamer; James Keelaghan, Second-Hand; Jocelyn Pettit, Wind Rose; Suzie Ungerleider, My Name Is Suzie Ungerleider | Sultans of String, Sanctuary; Ayrad, III; Jaffa Road, Until When; Lenka Lichtenberg, Thieves of Dreams; Wesli, Tradisyon |
| Single of the Year | New/Emerging Artist |
| William Prince and Serena Ryder, "Sing Me a Song"; Fortunate Ones, "Heavy Heart"; Geneviève et Alain, "À travers mes yeux"; The Irish Rovers, "Hey Boys Sing Us a Song"; Madison Violet, "Sweet Desperado"; Pretty Archie, "Familiar Feeling"; Quote the Raven, "Love You the Best"; Tanya Tagaq, "Teeth Agape"; Julian Taylor, "100 Proof" | RedFox, Stranger Love; Camie, troubadour; Cheval, Singer Songwrecker; Tennyson King, Good Company; Alex Krawczyk, Le Olam; Andrew Waite, Andrew Waite |
| Producer | Pushing the Boundaries |
| Chris McKhool and John "Beetle" Bailey — Sultans of String, Sanctuary; Corwin Fox and Yael Wand — Yael Wand, Saltwater Heartwood; The Fretless and Joby Baker — The Fretless, Open House; Katia Makdissi-Warren — Oktoécho, Transcestral; Brenley MacEachern and Lisa MacIsaac — Madison Violet, eleven | Oktoécho, Transcestral; Digging Roots, Zhawenim; Lenka Lichtenberg, Thieves of Dreams / Zloději snů; Mélisande (électrotrad), Flash de mémoire; Sultans of String, Sanctuary |
Young Performer
Fiddelium, Fiddelium; The Fiddlaires, Fiddletainment; The Oot n' Oots, Ponderosa Bunchgrass and the Golden Rule; Paige Penney, Fingers Crossed; The Receivers, The Receivers
