= 8th Canadian Folk Music Awards =

2012 music awards ceremony

- Date: November 17, 2012
- Location: Imperial Theatre, Saint John, New Brunswick
- Country: Canada
- Hosted by: Benoit Bourque
- Website: folkawards.ca

The 8th Canadian Folk Music Awards were presented in Saint John, New Brunswick on November 17, 2012, and streamed online on Roots Music Canada's website. Winners were named in 17 categories, while recipients also were honored with special Innovator of the Year and Unsung Hero awards during a gala event at the Imperial Theatre that was hosted by Benoit Bourque of La Bottine Souriante.

== Nominees and recipients ==
Recipients are listed first and highlighted in boldface.

Traditional Album	Contemporary Album
**Metis Fiddler Quartet - Northwest Voyage Nord Ouest**; Nicolas Pellerin - Petit grain d'or; Le Vent du Nord - Tromper le temps; Sheesham and Lotus & 'Son - 1929; Lenka Lichtenberg - Songs for the Breathing Walls	**The Deep Dark Woods - The Place I Left Behind**; Linda McRae - Rough Edges and Ragged Hearts; Whitehorse - Whitehorse; Old Man Luedecke and Lake of Stew - Sing All About It; Rose Cousins - We Have Made a Spark
Children's Album	Traditional Singer
**Henri Godon - Chansons pour toutes sortes d'enfants**; Kathy Reid-Naiman and Hannah Naiman - Here We Go Zodeo; Andrew Queen - GROW; Will Stroet - Ensemble, en cadence; Shelley Bean & The Duckety Muds - Shelley Bean & The Duckety Muds	**Lenka Lichtenberg - Songs for the Breathing Walls**; Peter Wynne (The Wynnes) - The Wynnes; Kim Beggs (The Blue Warblers) - Pretty Good; Fred Jorgensen (The Navigators) - Soldiers & Sailors; Sneezy Waters - Sneezy Waters
Contemporary Singer	Instrumental Solo Artist
**Rose Cousins - We Have Made a Spark**; Keri Latimer - Crowsfeet and Greyskull; Geraldine Hollett (The Once) - Row Upon Row of the People They Know; Catherine MacLellan - Silhouette; Craig Cardiff - Floods and Fires	**Trent Freeman - Rock Paper Scissors**; Rik Barron - Speechless; Darren McMullen - Shoes for Molly; Andrew Collins - Cats and Dogs; Shaun Ferguson - Ascensions
Instrumental Group	English Songwriter
**The Fretless - Waterbound**; Sultans of String - MOVE; Oliver Schroer and Nuala Kennedy - Enthralled; Metis Fiddler Quartet - Northwest Voyage Nord Ouest; Gypsophilia - Constellation	**Catherine MacLellan - Silhouette**; Dala - Best Day; The Deep Dark Woods - The Place I Left Behind; Jon Brooks - Delicate Cages; Annie Lou - Grandma's Rules for Drinking; PEAR - Sweet 'n Gritty
French Songwriter	Vocal Group
**Mes Aïeux - À l'aube du printemps**; Anique Granger - Les outils qu'on a; Caracol - Blanc Mercredi; André Dédé Vander - French toast et peines perdues; Lisa LeBlanc - Lisa LeBlanc	**The Once - Row Upon Row of the People They Know**; Scarlett Jane - Stranger; Dala - Best Day; Whitehorse - Whitehorse; Sweet Alibi - Sweet Alibi
Ensemble	Solo Artist
**The Fretless - Waterbound**; Whitehorse - Whitehorse; Oliver Schroer and Nuala Kennedy - Enthralled; Le Vent du Nord - Tromper le temps; La Bottine Souriante - Appellation d'origine côntrolée	**Michael Jerome Browne - The Road Is Dark**; Matt Andersen - Coal Mining Blues; Del Barber - Headwaters; Anne Louise Genest (Annie Lou) - Grandma's Rules for Drinking; Rose Cousins - We Have Made a Spark
World Group	New/Emerging Artist
**Sultans of String - MOVE**; Roberto Lopez Afro-Colombian Jazz Orchestra - Azul; Zhambai Trio - Tambanavo; Sagapool - Sagapool; Surkalén - Essence de lumière	**Pharis and Jason Romero - A Passing Glimpse**; Scarlett Jane - Stranger; Lisa LeBlanc - Lisa LeBlanc; Ben Caplan & The Casual Smokers - In the Time of the Great Remembering; Three Little Birds - Three Little Birds
Producer	Pushing the Boundaries
**Rob Szabo - A Natural Fact (Steve Strongman)**; Chris McKhool - MOVE (Sultans of String); Mike Roth - Best Day (Dala); Glen Simmons - Soldiers & Sailors (The Navigators); François Couture - YAHNDAWA (YAHNDAWA')	**Sagapool - Sagapool**; Sultans of String - MOVE; Briga - Turbo Folk Stories; Gadji-Gadjo - La Folle Allure; The Fretless - Waterbound
Young Performer	
**Lucas Chaisson - Growing Pains**; Emily Madronich - Take It Away; The Archers - Much More Than Merry Men; Rebecca Lappa - Myths and Monsters; Cassie and Maggie - Fresh Heirs	

== Other special awards ==
Harmonica musician Mike Stevens was named the 2012 Innovator of the Year, an award created and presented by Folk Music Canada. Gerry Taylor of New Brunswick, a columnist, judge, and talent scout for over 50 years, was recognized as Atlantic Canada's Unsung Hero of folk music.
