= Li'l Andy =

Canadian folk singer-songwriter

Background information
- Born: Andrew McClelland; 1982 or 1983 (age 43–44); Wakefield, Quebec, Canada
- Genres: Country; old-time; folk
- Website: lilandy.net

Andrew McClelland, known professionally as Li'l Andy, is a Canadian country and old-time singer-songwriter, novelist and producer based in Montreal, Quebec. Known for his literary approach to Americana and alternative country. McClelland became known for performing site-specific concerts in the Montreal music scene of the early 2000s, and recording in non-studio locations, such as churches, abandoned movie theatres, and underground parking garages.

Since 2022, he has developed a multi-media performance art project titled The Complete Recordings of Hezekiah Procter (1925-1930) which explores the life of a fictitious 1920s country musician, "Hezekiah Procter", with McClelland performing as the titular character.

== Early life ==
McClelland was born in 1982 or 1983 in Wakefield, Quebec, and was raised on his family's farm in nearby Cantley. He began performing under the name Li'l Andy in 2003, and recording with his backing band Karaoke Cowboy in 2003.

His debut album, Tombstones & Arcades, was self-produced and features songs written between ages 18 and 20.

== Career ==
In 2008, McClelland released the album Home in Landfill Acres, earning a nomination for "Country/Folk Album of the Year" at the Gala alternatif de la musique indépendante du Québec (GAMIQ). Later that year, he staged "Tonight's the Night at Cinéma L'Amour", a concert that saw McClelland and Montreal band The Ideal Lovers performing the entirety of Neil Young's album in an adult movie theater. Reviewing the concert,The Village Voice described his original material as "roots-based Americana that actually deserves to be made."

In 2010, McClelland and his band recorded All Who Thirst Come to the Waters in Montreal's Saint-Jean-Baptiste Cathedral. Keery Doole of Exclaim! praised the album's "compellingly atmospheric, haunting sound". McClelland's band abandoned the "Karaoke Cowboy" name at the time the album was released.

In 2016, McClelland toured Western Canada extensively, performing house concerts in a series of small towns and remote communities. Later that year, he was a participating artist in the Leonard Cohen exhibit "Une brèche en toute chose" ("A Crack in Everything"), which appeared at the Musée d'art contemporain de Montréal and New York's The Jewish Museum.

During the 2010s McClelland increasingly combined music with multidisciplinary performance projects. At POP Montreal he presented Li'l Andy 3D, billed as a simultaneous live concert and stereoscopic film, while later serving as musical director of 5 Albums/5 Concerts, a concert series conceived as a companion-piece to the "Une brèche en toute chose" ("A Crack in Everything") exhibit. The New York Times, in a March 2018 review of a sold-out show, wrote the "audience listened rapturously to the performance" as McClelland and guest singers Erika Angell, Yves Jarvis and Dear Criminals reinterpreted Cohen's 1992 album The Future.

His 2019 album All The Love Songs Lied To Us featured guest appearances by Ariel Engle of Broken Social Scene, Patrick Watson, and The Barr Brothers. Reviewing the record, the Journal de Québec gave it four out of five stars, calling it the best album of his career. Le Canal Auditif wrote that the album stood out more for its lyrical content than its music, though found the arrangements and musicianship well-executed. Americana UK called the record "funny, moving, morbid and romantic."

In 2024, McClelland served as producer for the album Introducing... by Quebec country artist Ben Vallee.

=== Hezekiah Procter ===
Starting in 2022, McClelland also began performing under the name of "Hezekiah Procter", a fictional character featured in his album, novel and box-set The Complete Recordings of Hezekiah Procter (1925–1930). The project is styled as a retrospective compilation of a long, lost legend of early country music, complete with a 128-page novel in the form of liner notes. Eighteen of the 29 songs included on the album were recorded on an antique wire recorder manufactured in 1937. The following year, the album was nominated for "Songwriter of the Year" and "Traditional Singer of the Year" at the Canadian Folk Music Awards.

At live appearances, McClelland and his band have performed under the names "Hezekiah Procter", "Hezekiah Procter & The Hash-House Seranaders" and "The Complete Recordings of Hezekiah Procter", with all musicians remaining in character throughout. A 2024 concert review by Dutch music website The Next Gig, described the in-character stage show as blending music, faith-healing showmanship, and social commentary. From 2024 to 2026, the group appeared at festivals Down the Rabbit Hole (The Netherlands), the Tønder Festival (Denmark), and the Shetland Folk Festival (Scotland).

== Critical reception ==
The Globe and Mail described The Complete Recordings of Hezekiah Procter stage show "as much performance art as it is a concert". In Quebec, Le Devoir wrote that the "128 pages of the documentary novel are as captivating as the official and celebrated accounts devoted in other works to Jimmie Rodgers, Robert Johnson, or Hank Williams."

Critics praised the exhaustive nature of the project and the historical research used in McClelland's novel and recording process. Canadian indie music website Tinnitist included the album in its "Albums of the Week" feature, describing McClelland as having "gone down the rabbit hole to create the greatest roots artist who never existed." Writing for Dutch culture website Kultuurfabriek Kooi-Aap, poet and critic Harry de Jong wrote that the project "was pieced together by McClelland with great expertise ... fictional and historical facts are very skillfully interwoven in the book." England-based roots music publication Americana UK reviewed the album, writing "this is a project that really deserves to be properly recognised for the triumph that it is."

== Discography ==
- Tombstones & Arcades (self-released)
- Home in Landfill Acres (2008, as Li'l Andy & Karaoke Cowboy)
- All Who Thirst Come to the Waters (2010)
- While the Engines Burn (2014)
- All The Love Songs Lied To Us (2019)
- The Complete Recordings of Hezekiah Procter (1925–1930) (2022)
- In the Heart of the Machine (forthcoming)
