= Rob Lutes =

Canadian folk and blues musician (born 1968)

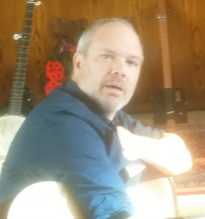
Rob Lutes

Rob Lutes (born 1968) is a Canadian folk and blues musician with the band Sussex. He is also a solo artist. He is most noted for his 2017 album Walk in the Dark, for which he won the Canadian Folk Music Award for Contemporary Singer of the Year at the 14th Canadian Folk Music Awards in 2018.

Born in Toronto, Ontario and raised in Rothesay, New Brunswick, he is currently based in Montreal, Quebec.

Lutes released his debut album Gravity in 2000, and has since released five further solo albums, one album with Sussex, and one album as a duo with guitarist Rob MacDonald. He received his first CFMA nomination at the 5th Canadian Folk Music Awards in 2009, for Truth & Fiction in the English Songwriter of the Year category.

== Discography ==
- Gravity (2000)
- Middle Ground (2002)
- Ride the Shadows (2006)
- Truth & Fiction (2008)
- Rob Lutes and Rob MacDonald Live (2011)
- The Bravest Birds (2013)
- Parade Day (2016, with Sussex)
- Walk in the Dark (2017)
- Come Around (2021)
