= Vishtèn =

Canadian folk music group

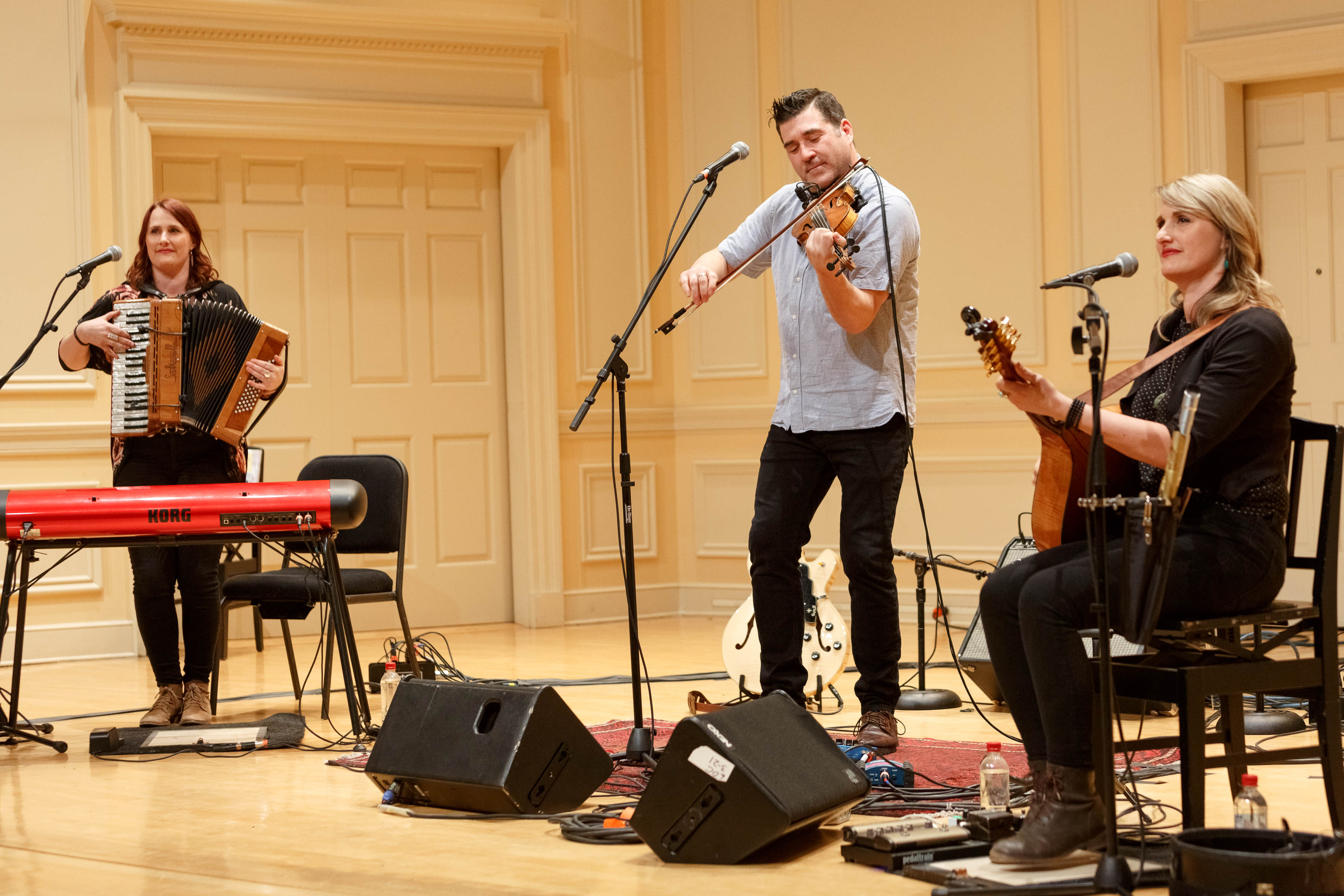
- Vishtèn performs at the Library of Congress in 2019 Left: Pastelle LeBlanc, Center: Pascal Miousse, Right: Emmanuelle LeBlanc

Background information
- Genres: folk/trad Acadian celtic
- Years active: 2004–present
- Members: Emmanuelle LeBlanc; Pascal Miousse; Megan Bergeron
- Past members: Pastelle LeBlanc (†)
- Website: https://vishten.net/

Vishtèn is a Canadian folk music group from Prince Edward Island and the Magdalen Islands, whose style is rooted in Acadian music. From its inception, the group consisted of vocalists and instrumentalists Pastelle and Emmanuelle LeBlanc, and instrumentalist Pascal Miousse. This lineup was unchanged until Pastelle LeBlanc died of breast cancer in 2022 at age 42. After Pastelle's death, the group operated as a duo until longtime collaborator Megan Bergeron officially joined the group in 2025.

The group is most noted for their 2018 album Horizons, which received a Juno Award nomination for Traditional Roots Album of the Year at the Juno Awards of 2019. The band includes instruments such as fiddle, electric guitar, accordion, mandolin, whistles, jaw harp, foot percussion and bodhran.

Horizons also won several awards from Music PEI, including best francophone artist, group recording and roots traditional recording. In 2018 they also collaborated with Joseph Edgar, Robin-Joël Cool, Wanabi Farmeur, Lisa LeBlanc, Caroline Savoie, and Édith Butler on the album Grand tintamarre ! - Chansons et comptines acadiennes, which won the Canadian Folk Music Award for Children's Album of the Year at the 14th Canadian Folk Music Awards.

== Discography ==
- Vishtèn (2004)
- 11:11 (2007)
- Live (2008)
- Mōsaïk (2012)
- Terre Rouge (2015)
- Horizons (2018)
- Expansion (2024)

== Awards and honours ==
- East Coast Music Awards (ECMA)
  - 2019 Recording of the year - Folk/Trad for Horizons
  - 2016 Recording of the year - Roots/Trad for Terre Rouge
  - 2013 Francophone album of the year for Mosaïk
  - 2006 Francophone album of the year for 11:11
  - 2002 Media's’ choice
- Music PEI
  - 2025 Album of the year for Expansion
  - 2025 Traditional Roots Recording of the Year for Expansion
  - 2021 Francophone Artist of the year
  - 2021 Livestream of the year
  - 2020 Francophone Artist of the year
  - 2019 Francophone Artist of the year
  - 2019 Traditional recording of the year for Horizon
  - 2016 Francophone Artist of the year
  - 2008 Francophone artist of the year
  - 2008 Album of the year for Live
  - 2008 Traditional group of the year
- La Société professionnelle des auteurs et des compositeurs du Québec (SPACQ)/ The Professional Society of Authors and Composers of Québec
  - 2015 Édith Butler Prize – Canadian francophonie
