= Les Surveillantes =

French Canadian musical group

- Origin: Winnipeg, Manitoba, Canada
- Genres: Folk, indie pop, acoustic
- Years active: 2006–present
- Members: Denis Vrignon-Tessier; Jérémie Gosselin; Eric Gosselin
- Past members: Danielle Burke
- Website: lessurveillantes.com

Les Surveillantes is a French Canadian musical group based in the Saint Boniface district of Winnipeg, Manitoba. Their music integrates many genres, such as folk and indie, and it was inspired from bluegrass. The band has performed across Canada.

They generally mix banjos, guitars and bass with two microphones for the four members. Each member is a singer, instrumentalist, and composer.

== History ==
The four founding members had played in other Franco-Manitoban groups before 2006. They met at 100NONS, an organization for French music in Manitoba. They began by performing concerts in Saint-Boniface in Manitoba.

After winning the Festival international de la chanson de Granby public prize and three other awards at the Chant'Ouest tour in 2009, the group became more popular at national level. After their success in the Réseau National des Galas de la chanson, the group toured in Canada and performed at many festivals, including Coup de Coeur francophone Montreal, and Winnipeg in November 2009, and in 2010 the Festival Vue sur la Relève at Montreal in 2010, the Chicane Albertaine at Nordegg, and the Festival international de la chanson de Granby (out of contest).

In 2011, Les Surveillantes were nominated for a Canadian Folk Music Award and a Western Canada Music Award. They performed at the Festival des cultures francophones de Halifax. In November of that year, Danielle Burke left the band.

== Discography ==
- Mon grand sapin (single) (2020)
- Feu les artifices (2020)
- La racine carrée du coeur (2010)
- Les Surveillantes (Maxi disque format court) (2009)

== Awards ==
- Nominated Artiste ou groupe de l'Ouest canadien par excellence, Gala des Prix Trille Or (2011)
- Won Prix SACEF/Place des Arts, Contact Ouest (2010)
- Won Prix du public, Festival International de la Chanson de Granby (2009)
- Won Prix André-Mercure, Chant'Ouest (2009)
- Won Prix Étoile Galaxie, Chant'Ouest (2009)
- Won Prix du public, Chant'Ouest (2009)
- Won Prix du jury, Gala Manitobain de la Chanson (2009)
- Won Prix du public, Gala Manitobain de la Chanson (2009)

== See also ==
- List of bands from Canada
