= Jon Brooks =

Canadian musician and singer-songwriter

- Born: King City, Ontario, Canada
- Origin: Toronto, Ontario, Canada
- Genres: Singer-Songwriter, Anti-genre, Folk, Ambient, Roots music, Americana, Solo Acoustic, Alternative, Hip hop, Spoken Word, Blues
- Occupation: Singer-songwriter
- Instrument(s): 615 Taylor Guitar, piano, Hammond organ, harmonium, banjitar, harmonica, tamboa
- Years active: 2006–present
- Labels: Borealis Records, Fallen Tree Records
- Website: jonbrooks.ca

Jon Brooks is a Canadian musician and singer-songwriter best known as a solo performer but more recently as leader of Jon Brooks & The Outskirts of Approval. Brooks’ music may be characterized as literary, allusive, emotionally intense and difficult to categorize, borne as it is from a broad range of influence and musical incarnations. His lyrics attend to, in Brooks’ words, ‘calming those who’ve looked into and seen what is in their hearts and terrifying those who’ve not.’ His albums, often thematic, fixate over love, fear, death, religion, war, post traumatic stress, technology, animal justice, ecology, esoterica, and the stars.

== Biography ==
Born and raised in King City, Ontario, Brooks attended Humber College in the late 80s to study jazz piano before fronting a blues-rock Toronto based band in the early 90s as principal songwriter, lead singer, and Hammond organist. As a keyboard player, he played with The Norge Union, Days of You, and The Headstones.

In 1996, Brooks relocated to Kraków, Poland to study Eastern European history and politics at Jagiellonian University. He travelled extensively throughout Poland, Hungary, Ukraine, the Baltics, Croatia, and the recently war ruined Bosnia-Herzegovina. Upon returning to Toronto he attended York University to study an aleatory range of interests including music, politics, theology, and architecture; eventually graduating with a degree in English Literature.

Sometime around 2003 and at the urging of two of his literary heroes and mentors, Austin Clarke and Barry Callaghan respectively, Brooks returned to music, this time with a Taylor 615 acoustic guitar. In 2005 he released, No Mean City - his first of seven thematic albums noted as much for Brooks’ invented and percussive guitar style as his lyrics’ temerity, dark humour, and obsessive interest in violence, love, paradox and the unity of opposites. Brooks’ songs are universal in theme and particular in Canadian subject matter. His songs are often peopled by morally ambiguous and non-binary souls - in his words, ‘those on the outskirts of approval.’ He writes in a variety of forms including linear ballads, list songs, sonnets, ghazals, cyclical coronas, spoken word, and, at times, a more abstract and non-linear form of storytelling.

Brooks cites Czeslaw Milosz, John Milton, Thomas Merton, Svetlana Alexievich, Mary Oliver, Simone Weil, Alexander Solzhenitsyn, Andrei Platonov, Dostoyevsky, and Anton Chekhov as his foremost literary influences. Songwriters and performers past and present Brooks most admires include Blind Willie Johnson, Howlin Wolf, Nick Cave, PJ Harvey, Gord Downie, Sam Baker, Iris Dement, Leonard Cohen, Gil Scott-Heron, Nina Simone, Sanam Marvi, Neil Young, and Morrissey.

Brooks currently holds the dubious record for most nominations at The Canadian Folk Music Awards for English Songwriter of the Year. In 2010 Brooks became the fourth Canadian since 1975 to win the esteemed, Kerrville New Folk Award at The Kerrville Folk Festival in Texas.

== Career ==
=== No Mean City (2006) ===
Brooks's first full-length offering was re-released digitally by Fallen Tree Records in 2019. No Mean City is a 13-song ode to the modern urban disaster and is set in Toronto's multicultural past and present. Focusing on newcomers, refugees, and the dispossessed the songs are densely layered with biblical, literary, and historical allusion. The idea for No Mean City was inspired by the Toronto architecture historian Eric Arthur's book of the same name – which also accounts for why all the songs devote equal attention to their characters' surrounding architecture.

=== Ours and the Shepherds (2007) ===
The title of Brooks's second release, Ours and the Shepherds (2007), was taken from Dorothy Day's response to her own reflection, "Whose fault is it? It's ours and the shepherds." A collection of Canadian war stories dating from World War I to current missions in Afghanistan, the 13 songs were inspired by the lives of the Canadians including Sen. Romeo Dallaire, Padre William Henry Davis, John McRae, Sgt. Tommy Prince, and James Loney. The album earned Brooks multiple awards, a place in the Canadian War Museum and the John McCrae Society, and his first Songwriter of the Year nomination at the 2007 Canadian Folk Music Awards.

=== Moth Nor Rust (2009) ===
Moth Nor Rust (2009) was Brooks's third release. The songs were inspired by "all that neither moth nor rust" can touch – love, hope, trust, faith, memory, justice, inspiration, and gratitude. The ten songs were recorded live in studio, solo, and without overdubs in the effort to amplify the austere theme of human essentials. Moth Nor Rust enjoyed international chart positions and worldwide airplay, as well as his second Songwriter of the Year nomination at the 2009 Canadian Folk Music Awards. The lyrics of the songs were published by Canada's foremost literary journal, Exile Editions.

=== Delicate Cages (2012) ===
Delicate Cages was initially released independently in November 2011 but was formally re-released by Borealis Records in May 2012. The album earned Brooks his third Songwriter of the Year nomination in 5 years from the Canadian Folk Music Awards. As in its three predecessors, the 11 songs on Delicate Cages reflect common themes, in this case love and fear and freedom and imprisonment. The title is taken from the Robert Bly poem Taking The Hands: "Taking the hands of someone you love, / you see they are delicate cages." Another similarity with Brooks's other releases is the wide-ranging, topical and controversial song subjects: the Alberta tar sands ("Fort McMurray"), Bill 101 and Quebec's language laws (Hudson Girl), Palestinian suicide bombers (Son of Hamas), a Bosnian child soldier turned Canadian mixed-martial-arts fighter (Cage Fighter), and so-called "honour killing" (The Lonesome Death of Aqsa Parvez). Morally and politically ambiguous, Delicate Cages offered what Brooks has since called "necessary and alternative understandings of 'hope' and 'grief' that are neither sanitized, dumbed down, nor cheapened or degraded by the modern lie of 'closure'".

=== The Smiling and Beautiful Countryside (2014) ===
Brooks's fifth album, The Smiling and Beautiful Countryside, released by Borealis Records in November 2014, consists solely of murder ballads and was recorded in Toronto by David Travers-Smith. It draws on philosophical paradox, gallows humour, impossible love, titillating gore, serial killers, gun dealers, rampage killings, missing women, First Nations injustice and catastrophe, necrophilia, Shakespeare, and John Milton. Throughout the record two distinct "murderers" terrorize society: the overt and alienated human killer and its psychotic double, the corporation – the "individual baptized by law". In this regard, The Smiling and Beautiful Countryside is Brooks's most overtly political and subversive album to date. The death count is 75. Nominated for Contemporary Album of the Year, the album also earned Brooks his fourth Songwriter of the Year nomination by the Canadian Folk Music Awards.

=== No One Travels Alone (2018) ===
Brooks' 6th album, No One Travels Alone, accomplished a first in modern songwriting: borrowing from the Elizabethan sonneteers, the album fulfils a ‘corona' of songs. Corona form interconnects each song by first and last lines; the last line of the first song becomes the first line of the following song, etc…until the final song completes a circle, or corona. In accord with the album's central theme of digital and atomic connectivity, Brooks' 2018 set of songs are interconnected, as are we; thus it is: ‘No One Travels Alone.’ NPR included the album among its esteemed Best of 2018 list.

=== Moth Nor Rust II (2019) ===
His seventh and latest album, Moth Nor Rust II, (Fallen Tree Records, 2019, September 13), revisits his 2009 solo acoustic set, Moth Nor Rust, with 10 years of artistic maturity and his new band, Jon Brooks & The Outskirts of Approval. The original Moth Nor Rust scratched the itch for an uplifting digression from darker earlier themes of urban disappointment in No Mean City (2006), by Canadian war and post traumatic stress stories in Ours and the Shepherds (2007). Moth Nor Rust became a fan favourite because it was the cadence that resolved his first two albums’ tensions by asking, what is it that makes us positively human? Brooks’ answer, borrowing from Matthew 6.19-20: all that neither moth nor rust can touch. Moth Nor Rust II was engineered and produced by the original engineer, Jason LaPrade and co-produced by Brooks’ longtime friend and musical compadre, Neil Cruickshank. In Jon's words, “The song is an art form that operates in time and 10 years has a way of transforming the song in ways worthy of revisiting.” The Outskirts of Approval include Joe Ernewein (electric guitar and pedal steel), John Showman (violin), and Vivienne Wilder (upright bass and vocals).

== Discography ==
- 2006 No Mean City - Independent/Fallen Tree Records
- 2007 Ours and the Shepherds - Independent/Fallen Tree Records
- 2009 Moth Nor Rust - Independent/Fallen Tree Records
- 2012 Delicate Cages - Borealis Records
- 2014 The Smiling and Beautiful Countryside - Borealis Records
- 2018 No One Travels Alone - Borealis Records
- 2019 Moth Nor Rust II - Fallen Tree Records

== Awards and nominations ==
- 2015 - Nominated - Canadian Folk Music Award – English Songwriter of the Year
- 2015 - Nominated - Canadian Folk Music Award – Contemporary Album of the Year
- 2014 - Nominated - Toronto Min Sook Lee Labour Arts Award
- 2012 - Nominated - Canadian Folk Music Award – English Songwriter of the Year
- 2010 - Won - International Songwriting Competition
- 2010 - Won - Kerrville New Folk Competition
- 2009 - Nominated - Canadian Folk Music Award – English Songwriter of the Year
- 2009 - Won - NPR’s Mountain Stage New Song Contest - Canadian Region
- 2007 - Nominated - Canadian Folk Music Award – English Songwriter of the Year

== Career highlights ==
- Jon's 2007 album of Canadian war stories, Ours and the Shepherds, is part of the permanent collection at The Canadian War Museum, Ottawa, ON; as well, the album was included in the permanent collection at The John McRae Society, Guelph, ON
- Since 2012, Jon has had six appearances at The Bluebird Cafe in Nashville, TN
- No One Travels Alone named ‘Best of 2018’ on NPR’s Global Village Radio
- Since 2008, Jon has performed at major festivals throughout Australia, Canada, the UK, and the US.
- 2007 CBC At 6 Taped a Remembrance Day performance at Bishop Marrocco/Thomas Merton High School, Toronto, ON
- 2007 Irish Famine Memorial Concert Jon performed for Ireland's President Mary McAleese, Toronto, ON
