= Madeleine Roger =

Canadian Singer-Songwriter

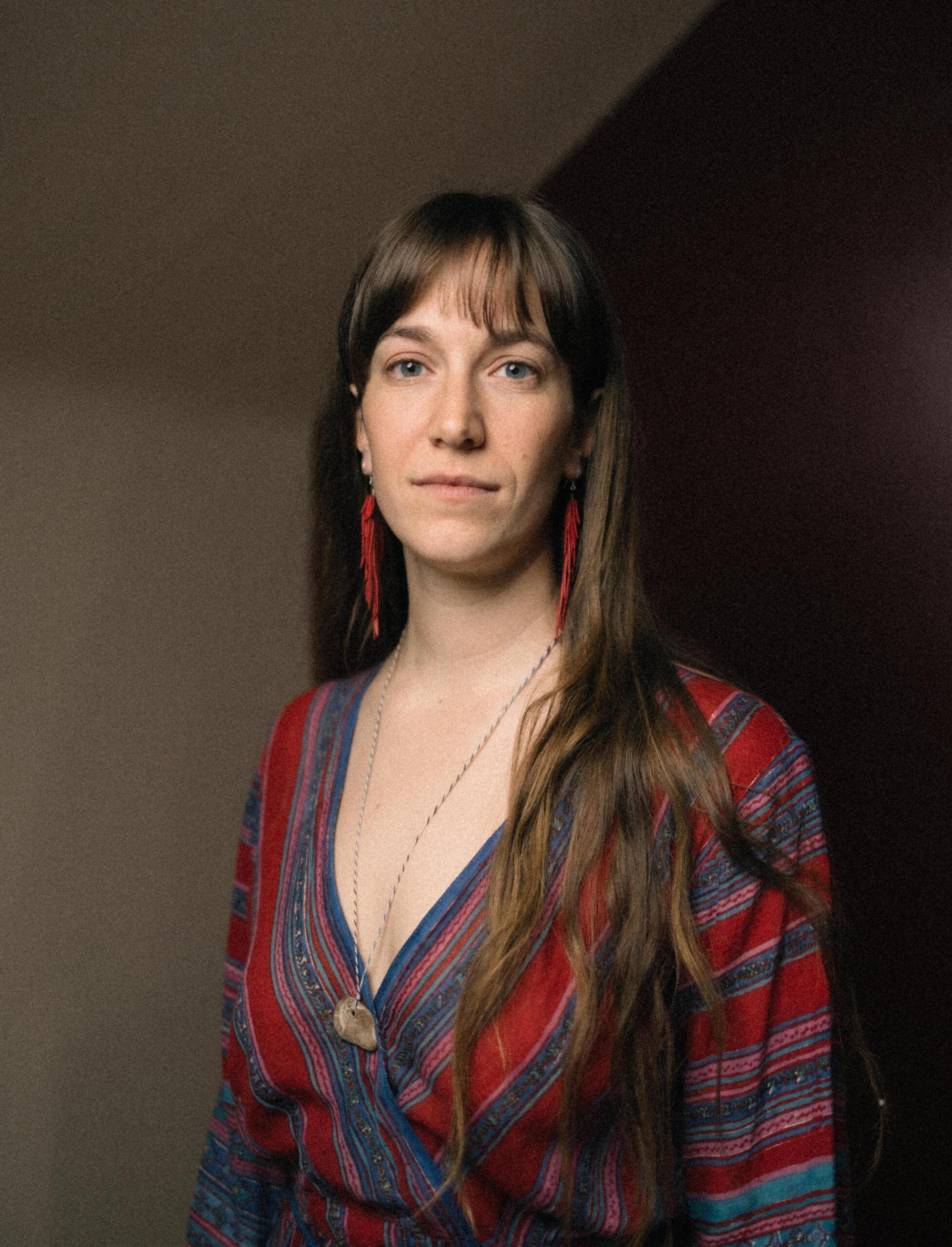

Background information
- Origin: Winnipeg, Manitoba, Canada
- Genre: Folk music
- Years active: 2016–present
- Label: Birthday Cake Media
- Formerly of: The Fretless
- Website: www.madeleineroger.com

Madeleine Roger is a singer-songwriter from Winnipeg, Canada. Her debut album, "Cottonwood" was released in 2019.

== History ==
“Cottonwood” was nominated for a Breakout West Award for Producer of the Year and a Canadian Folk Music Award for “English Songwriter of the Year” in 2019.

Her newest album "Nerve" was released in August, 2024. The album consists of 10 songs and was written at The Isokon Studio in Kingston, New York.

In 2024, Madeleine Roger was the featured vocalist and co-writer on The Fretless album, "Glasswing".

== Discography ==
- Cottonwood (2019)
- Nerve (2024)
