= The Slocan Ramblers =

Canadian bluegrass music group

The Slocan Ramblers are a Canadian bluegrass music group from Toronto, Ontario. They are most noted for their 2018 album Queen City Jubilee, which received a Juno Award nomination for Traditional Roots Album of the Year at the Juno Awards of 2019.

== History ==
The Slocan Ramblers formed in 2011; the band is named for the Slocan Valley in British Columbia. The group consists of mandolinist Adrian Gross, banjo player Frank Evans, guitarist Darryl Poulsen, and bassist Alastair Whitehead. Evans, Whitehead and Poulsen all perform vocals depending on the song.

They released their debut album, Shaking Down the Acorns, in 2012, and followed up with Coffee Creek in 2015. Coffee Creek received a Canadian Folk Music Award nomination for Best Traditional Album at the 12th Canadian Folk Music Awards.

In 2016, the Slocan Ramblers toured in the United States for three months.

In 2018, the Ramblers opened for Jerry Douglas at the Saskatchewan Jazz Festival. In 2019, the band performed at the International Bluegrass Music Association Momentum Awards event in Raleigh, North Carolina. That year they also performed at the Cowichan Valley Bluegrass Festival in British Columbia.

In 2025, the Ramblers performed on Stage 7 of the Edmonton Folk Music Festival.

== Discography ==
- Shaking Down the Acorns (2012)
- Coffee Creek (2015)
- Queen City Jubilee (2018)
- Up the Hill and Through the Fog (2022)
