= 10th Canadian Folk Music Awards =

2014 music awards ceremony

- Date: November 29, 2014
- Location: The Bronson Centre, Ottawa, Ontario
- Country: Canada
- Hosted by: Shelagh Rogers and Benoit Bourque
- Website: folkawards.ca

The 10th Canadian Folk Music Awards was presented at The Bronson Centre in Ottawa, Ontario on November 29, 2014 and was hosted by the CBC's Shelagh Rogers and musician Benoit Bourque.

== Nominees and recipients ==
Recipients are listed first and highlighted in boldface.

Traditional Album	Contemporary Album
**Còig, Five**; Sarah Jane Scouten, The Cape; The High Bar Gang, Lost and Undone: A Gospel Bluegrass Companion; Poor Angus, Gathering; Moustafa Kouyaté & Romain Malagnoux, Les frontières imaginaires	**The Strumbellas - We Still Move on Dance Floors**; The Bros. Landreth - Let it Lie; Matt Andersen - Weightless; Colleen Rennison - See The Sky About To Rain; Jill Zmud - Small Matters of Life and Death
Children's Album	Traditional Singer
**Fred Penner, Where In The World**; Helen Austin, Colour It; Kathy Reid-Naiman, When It's Autumn; Rattle and Strum, Rattle and Strum; Alex Mahé, Réveillons les bonnes chansons	**Mélisande Gélinas-Fauteux, Les métamorphoses**; Tamar Ilana of Ventanas, Ventanas; Sarah Jane Scouten, The Cape; Kim Beggs, Beauty and Breaking; Fafard & Schwartz, Borrowed Horses
Contemporary Singer	Instrumental Solo Artist
**Matt Andersen, Weightless**; Jadea Kelly, Clover; Del Barber, Prairieography; James Keelaghan, History; Matthew Barber, Big Romance	**Jayme Stone, The Other Side of the Air**; Maxim Cormier, 2; Gillian Boucher, Attuned; Steve Dawson, Rattlesnake Cage; Robert Michaels, Via Italia
Instrumental Group	English Songwriter
**The Andrew Collins Trio, A Play On Words**; Quinn Bachand, Brishen; The Fretless, The Fretless; MAZ, Chasse-Galerie; Còig, Five	**Shari Ulrich, Everywhere I Go**; Del Barber, Prairieography; James Keelaghan, History; Lennie Gallant, Live Acoustic at The Carleton; Chris Ronald, Timeline
French Songwriter	Aboriginal Songwriter
**Les Hay Babies, Mon Homesick Heart**; Antoine Corriveau, Les Ombres Longues; Alexandre Poulin, Le mouvement des marées; Klô Pelgag, L'Alchimie des monstres; Laurence Hélie, À Présent le Passé	**Amanda Rheaume & John MacDonald, Keep a Fire**; Tanya Tagaq, Animism; Jasmine Netsena, Take You With Me; Buffy & Larry, Surrounded; Vince Fontaine (Indian City), Colors
Vocal Group	Ensemble
**The High Bar Gang, Lost and Undone: A Gospel Bluegrass Companion**; Gathering Sparks, Gathering Sparks; The Marrieds, Saving Hope; Sweet Alibi, We've Got To; The Fugitives, Everything Will Happen	**The Fretless, The Fretless**; Quinn Bachand, Brishen; Ventanas, Ventanas; The High Bar Gang, Lost and Undone: A Gospel Bluegrass Companion; Notre Dame de Grass, That's How the Music Begins
Solo Artist	World Solo Artist
**Lennie Gallant, Live Acoustic at The Carleton**; Del Barber, Prairieography; Shari Ulrich, Everywhere I Go; James Keelaghan, History; Matthew Barber, Big Romance	**Quique Escamilla, 500 Years of Night**; Susan Aglukark, Dreaming Of Home; Jorge Martinez, Carnaval; Amanda Martinez, Mañana; Robert Michaels, Via Italia
World Group	New/Emerging Artist
**Moustafa Kouyaté & Romain Malagnoux, Les frontières imaginaires**; Quinn Bachand, Brishen; Tanga, HavanaElectro; MAZ, Chasse-Galerie; Shtreiml, Eastern Hora	**The Bros. Landreth, Let it Lie**; Quinn Bachand, Brishen; Robyn Dell'Unto, Little Lines; Kacy & Clayton, The Day Is Past & Gone; Scott Cook, One More Time Around
Producer	Pushing the Boundaries
**Tom Terrell and Karl Falkenham, City Ghosts (The Modern Grass)**; The Fretless with Joby Baker, The Fretless (The Fretless); Luke Doucet, Éphémère sans repère (Whitehorse); Marc Maziade, Chasse-Galerie (MAZ); Steve Dawson, St. Louis Times (Jim Byrnes)	**Tanya Tagaq, Animism**; West My Friend, When The Ink Dries; The Fretless, The Fretless; Mark Berube, Russian Dolls; MAZ, Chasse-Galerie
Young Performer	
**Kacy & Clayton, The Day Is Past & Gone**; Quinn Bachand, Brishen; Keiffer Mclean, Drama in the Attic; Rebecca Lappa, Ode to Tennyson; Benjamin Dakota Rogers, Wayfarer	

== Other special awards ==
Harvey Glatt received the Unsung Hero award for his decades of support to the Canadian folk music scene. Paul Symes was given the award for Innovator of the Year, in recognition of the "tenacity, vision and innovation" required to establish a venue outside Ottawa.
