= Kaia Kater =

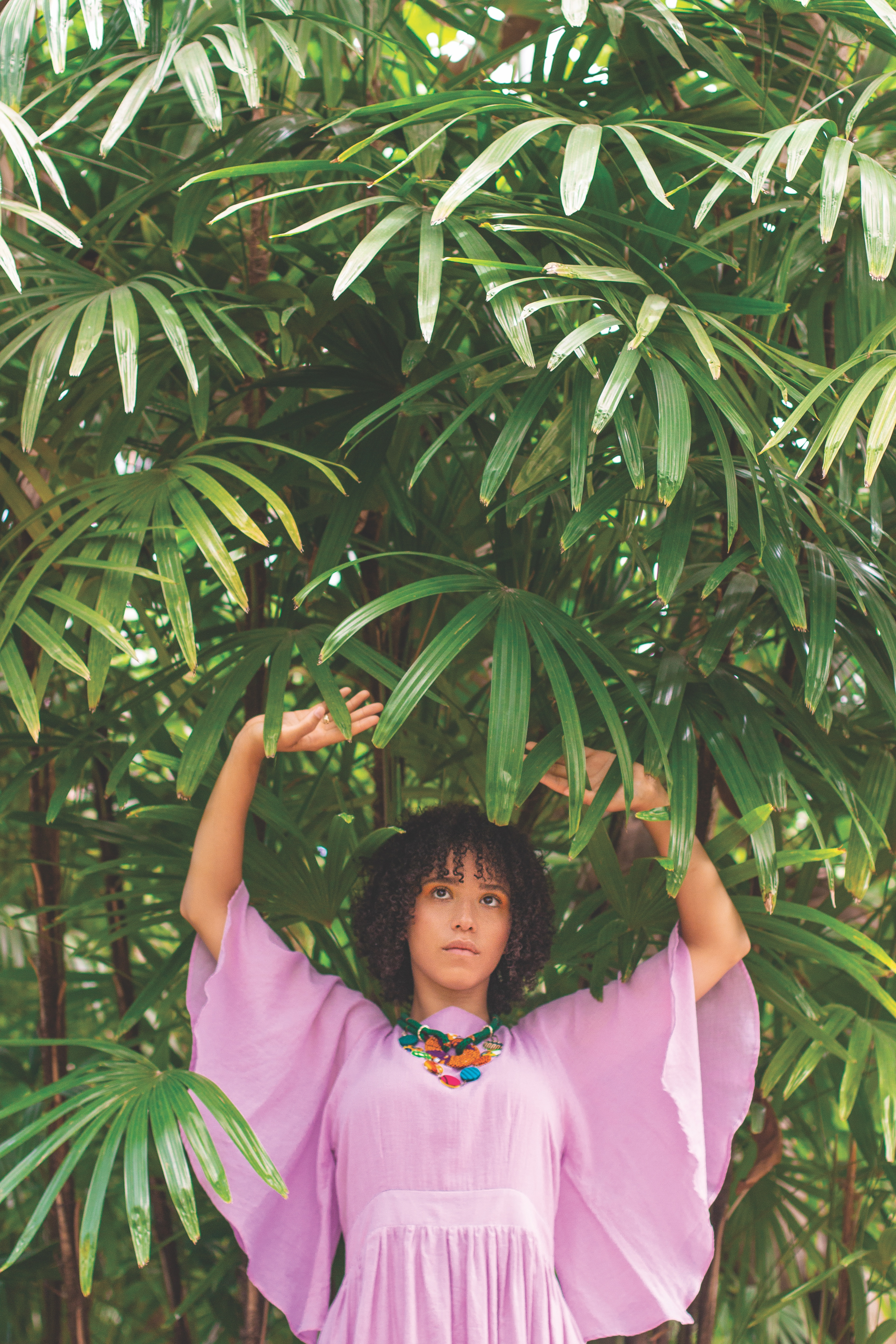
- Kater in July 2018

Background information
- Born: September 1993 (age 33); Montreal, Quebec, Canada
- Origin: Grenadian-Canadian
- Genres: Indie Folk; Americana; Old Time Music
- Instruments: voice, banjo, piano, guitar
- Label: Smithsonian Folkways Recordings (Outside Canada)
- Website: kaiakater.com

Kaia Kater (born September 1993) is a Canadian singer-songwriter, guitar, piano and banjo player.

== Background ==
Kater was born in Montreal, Quebec, where she spent her early childhood in Mile End. She started playing the banjo at 12 years old. She also lived in Wakefield, Ottawa and Winnipeg before attending Davis & Elkins College in Elkins, West Virginia on a banjo scholarship. In Elkins, she also learned to flatfoot and deepened her knowledge of body percussion (hambone). Kater spoke about her experience being a woman of color in West Virginia, and experiencing racism. "If 70 or 75 percent of the time it was a wonderful experience, there was also that other part of the experience where I did encounter some racism, or I witnessed racism. I felt the racial divide very strongly, more so than in Canada". Her mother is from Quebec, and her father immigrated to Canada from Grenada as a teenager in 1986 as part of a young speakers program, after the U.S. invasion.

She grew up spending significant time in the North American folk music community, attending festivals, camps and conferences frequently during her teen years.

== Musical career ==
At 17, she recorded her first EP recording titled "Rappin' Shady Grove" that she claims was inspired by Drake and his storytelling in his songs.

She released her first EP Old Soul in 2012, and her first full-length album Sorrow Bound in 2014.

In 2016, she won the "Pushing the Boundaries" award at the 12th Canadian Folk Music Awards for her third album, Nine Pin. The Guardian reviewed it as "tremendous" with four stars out of five. Rolling Stone noted Kater's mixture of traditional banjo playing and "sobering, honest lyrics exploring all-too-current themes including poverty and racism...a quiet, yet powerful storm", naming her a "need to know" artist of 2016. NPR highlighted her single, "St. Elizabeth," for its rustic wisdom, comparing her vocalization to a "run-down preacher dispensing folk wisdom on the street." Kater recorded the album in a single day in Toronto.

In 2017 and 2018, Kater toured extensively, performing at venues and festivals throughout the United States, Canada, Europe and the United Kingdom, including a performance at the Kennedy Center, at the invitation of the Grammy Museum as part of a tribute to Pete Seeger. She performed at the 2018 Newport Folk Festival, with Rolling Stone highlighting her performance as one of the '12 Best Things We Saw' and Carnegie Hall announced her performance as part of Migrations: The Making of America in their 2018-2019 season.

Kater's 2018 album, Grenades, explores her personal history, including the story of her father's childhood and journey to Canada. Kater traveled to her father's homeland of Grenada to seek inspiration for the album. This was the first trip she had taken there as an adult.

While influenced by folk music, Kater cites Nina Simone, Erykah Badu and Lauryn Hill as important voices in shaping the direction of her artistic, social and political expression.

Her album Strange Medicine was longlisted for the 2025 Polaris Music Prize. The Guardian noted the album's lyrics were both personal and widely reflective on contemporary politics. NPR found the album innovative. The album won the 2025 JUNO award for Contemporary Roots Album of the Year. In May 2026, she discussed her training as a banjo player and the historical context of protest music in the United States and Canada on an episode of Reimagining Country hosted by Jamaal Khadar, on NTS Radio.

== Discography ==
- Old Soul (2012)
- Sorrow Bound (2014)
- Nine Pin (2016)
- Grenades (2018)
- Strange Medicine (2024)
