= 7th Canadian Folk Music Awards =

2011 music awards ceremony

- Date: December 4, 2011
- Location: Isabel Bader Theatre, Toronto, Ontario
- Country: Canada
- Hosted by: Shelagh Rogers and Benoit Bourque
- Website: folkawards.ca

The 7th Canadian Folk Music Awards were held on December 4, 2011, at the Isabel Bader Theatre in Toronto, Ontario.

== Nominees and recipients ==
Recipients are listed first and highlighted in boldface.

Traditional Album	Contemporary Album
**Genticorum - Nagez Rameurs**; Dave Gunning - ...a tribute to John Allan Cameron; Finest Kind - For Honour and For Gain; De Temps Antan - Les Habits de Papier; La Volée d'Castors - Le Retour	**Bruce Cockburn - Small Source of Comfort**; Twilight Hotel - When the Wolves Go Blind; Les Charbonniers de l'enfer - Nouvelles fréquentations; Lynn Miles - Fall for Beauty; The Good Lovelies - Let The Rain Fall
Children's Album	Traditional Singer
**Benoît Archambault - Les pourquoi**; Kathy Reid-Naiman - I Love to Hear the Sounds; Marky Weinstock - Songs For Dreamers; Colleen Power with Crooked Stovepipe - For Little Ones; Will Stroet - Walk 'n' Roll	**Dave Gunning - ...a tribute to John Allan Cameron**; Enoch Kent - Take A Trip With Me; Lizzy Hoyt - Home; Eileen McGann - Pocketful Of Rhymes; Joel Fafard - Cluck Old Hen
Contemporary Singer	Instrumental Solo Artist
**Suzie Vinnick - Me 'n' Mabel**; David Myles - Live at the Carleton; Cat Jahnke - The Stories are Taking Their Toll; Bruce Cockburn - Small Source of Comfort; Matthew Barber - Matthew Barber	**Jayme Stone - Room of Wonders**; Jaron Freeman-Fox - Manic Almanac : Slow Möbius; Anne Lindsay - Hurry On Home; April Verch - That's How We Run; Don Ross - Breakfast for Dogs
Instrumental Group	English Songwriter
**Creaking Tree String Quartet - Sundogs**; Qristina & Quinn Bachand - Family; Maz - Télescope; Eh?! - Eh?!; Raz-de-Marée/Tidal Wave - Marche du St-Laurent	**Lynn Miles - Fall for Beauty**; Ron Hynes - Stealing Genius; David Francey - Late Edition; Mae Moore - Folklore; Bruce Cockburn - Small Source of Comfort
French Songwriter	Aboriginal Songwriter
**Alexandre Poulin - Une lumière allumée**; Jean-François Lessard - Jean-François Lessard; Claude Cormier - Acoustique; Les Surveillantes - La racine carrée du coeur	**Vince Fontaine - Songs for Turtle Island**; Robert Davidson & Terri-Lynn Williams-Davidson - New Journeys; Janet Panic - Samples; Don Amero - The Long Way Home; Kristi Lane Sinclair - I Love You
Vocal Group	Ensemble
**The Good Lovelies - Let The Rain Fall**; Finest Kind - For Honour and For Gain; Les Charbonniers de l'enfer - Nouvelles fréquentations; The Wailin' Jennys - Bright Morning Stars; Genticorum - Nagez Rameurs	**Genticorum - Nagez Rameurs**; Creaking Tree String Quartet - Sundogs; Maz - Télescope; The Wailin' Jennys - Bright Morning Stars; Harry Manx & Kevin Breit - Strictly Whatever
Solo Artist	World Solo Artist
**Bruce Cockburn - Small Source of Comfort**; Ken Whiteley - Another Day's Journey; David Francey - Late Edition; Mae Moore - Folklore; Ruth Moody - The Garden	**Kiran Ahluwalia - aam zameen : common ground**; Lenka Lichtenberg - Fray; Massiel Yanira - Una Voz; Terri-Lynn Williams-Davidson - New Journeys; Zekuhl - I BOLO
World Group	New/Emerging Artist
**Minor Empire - Second Nature**; Nizar Tabcharani & The Backstrings - Bayati Ana; Trio Bembe - OH MY SOUL; Maz - Télescope; Ouzo Power - Ouzo Power Greatest Hits (Volume 1)	**Dave Gunning - ...a tribute to John Allan Cameron**; Andrea Ramolo - The Shadows and the Cracks; Ruth Moody - The Garden; Ashley Condon - Come In From The Cold; Joe Nolan - Goodbye Cinderella
Producer	Pushing the Boundaries
**Mark Howard & David Travers-Smith - Bright Morning Stars (The Wailin' Jennys)**; Dave Gunning w/ Allie Bennett & John Meir - a tribute to John Allan Cameron (Dave Gunning); Paul Mills - Stealing Genius (Ron Hynes); Dave Zeglinski, Steve Bell & Murray Pulver - Kindness (Steve Bell); David Travers-Smith - Soon The Birds (Oh Susanna)	**Geoff Berner - Victory Party**; New Country Rehab - New Country Rehab; Twilight Hotel - When the Wolves Go Blind; Jaron Freeman-Fox - Manic Almanac : Slow Möbius; Ruth Moody - The Garden; Evalyn Parry - SPIN
Young Performer	
**Molly Thomason - Beauty Queen**; Qristina & Quinn Bachand - Family; Olivia Korkola - Playing in Traffic; Rebecca Lappa - Not in Neverland; The Doll Sisters - The Road EP	
