= Catherine MacLellan =

Canadian singer

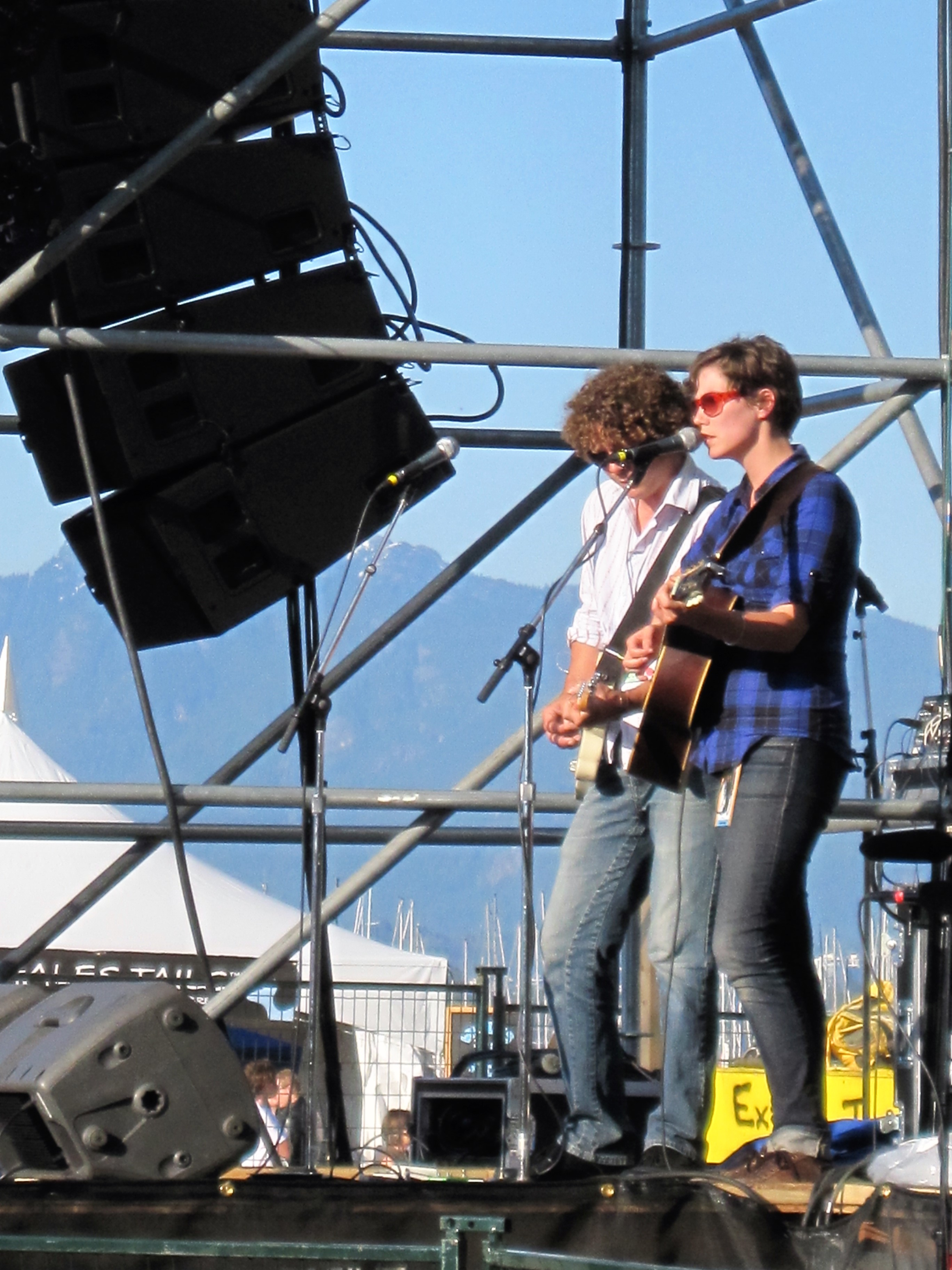
- Catherine MacLellan, July 2010

Background information
- Origin: Summerside, Prince Edward Island
- Genres: Folk
- Occupation: Singer-songwriter
- Instruments: Vocals, guitar
- Years active: 2002–present
- Website: Catherine MacLellan

Catherine MacLellan is a Canadian folk singer-songwriter, based in Prince Edward Island.

== Early life ==
The daughter of Canadian songwriter Gene MacLellan, MacLellan was born in Burlington, Ontario but raised in Summerside, Prince Edward Island.

Before beginning her solo recording career, she sang with The New Drifts, a four-piece band featuring Island musicians James Phillips (guitar, mandolin), Stéphane Bouchard (bass) and Dave Gould (drums & percussion). She spent time working at the box office of Summerside's Harbourfront Jubilee Theatre.

== Career ==
MacLellan released two albums, 2004's Dark Dream Midnight and 2006's Church Bell Blues, independently before signing to True North Records, which rereleased Church Bell Blues in 2007. She followed up with Water in the Ground in 2009; Dark Dream Midnight was included as a bonus disc with physical copies of that album. She toured Canada, the United States and the United Kingdom throughout 2009 to support the album, including performances on CBC Radio's Canada Live and The Vinyl Cafe. Her album Silhouette was released by True North Records in July 2011. Her album "The Raven's Sun" was released August 2014.

She has also participated in two collaborative "Canadian Songbook" tours: in 2008 with Murray McLauchlan, Stephen Fearing and Paul Quarrington, and in 2009 with McLauchlan, Barney Bentall and Nathan Rogers.

In November 2009, she recorded a new song, "Singing Sands", for CBC Radio 2's Great Canadian Song Quest.

In 2014 MacLellan released her first independent record since signing with True North, The Raven's Sun. The record was recorded in Woodstock, New York at Hidden Quarry Studio, Engineered by Danny Blume, and produced by MacLellan's long-time musical partner Chris Gauthier. The Raven's Sun was received with critical-acclaim and won many awards including a 2015 JUNO award.

In 2017 she made a record on True North records with songs of her father Gene MacLellan. This record was named after the LP her father recorded in 1977 If It's Alright With You. This album tied in with a show by the same name in the summer of 2017 that MacLellan wrote based on her father's life and music.

In 2019 she self-produced and released a new record called Coyote.

== Personal life ==
MacLellan was formerly married to singer-songwriter Al Tuck, now divorced, with whom she has a daughter, Isabel.

== Discography ==
- Dark Dream Midnight (2004)
- Church Bell Blues (2006)
- Water in the Ground (2009)
- Silhouette (2011)
- The Raven's Sun (2014)
- If it's alright with you – The songs of Gene MacLellan (2017)
- Coyote (2019)

== Awards and achievements ==
- 2015 JUNO Award - Contemporary Roots Album Of the Year
- 2012 East Coast Music Awards & Nominations:
  - Folk Recording of the Year – Winner
  - Album of the Year
  - Solo Recording of the Year
- 2010 East Coast Music Awards & Nominations:
  - Female Solo Recording of the Year – Winner
  - Folk Recording of the Year – Winner
  - SOCAN Songwriter of the Year
- Winner for English Songwriter of the Year at 2012 Canadian Folk Music Awards
- Winner for Solo Artist of the Year at 2009 Canadian Folk Music Awards
