= The Small Glories =

Canadian musical group

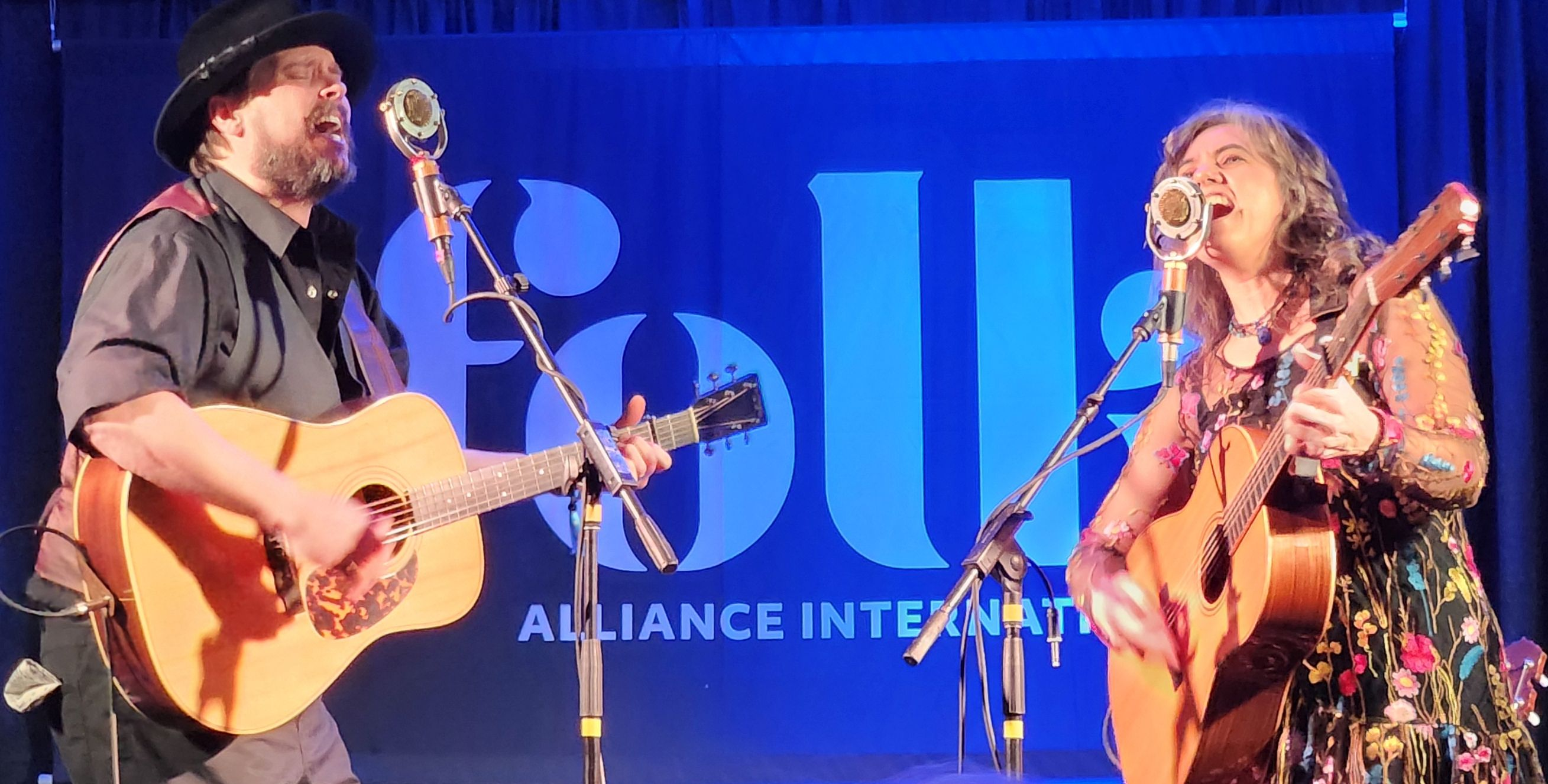
- The Small Glories, Kansas City (2023)

Background information
- Genres: Folk
- Years active: 2016–present
- Members: Cara Luft, JD Edwards

The Small Glories is a Canadian folk duo from Winnipeg composed of Cara Luft and J.D. Edwards, both of whom perform on guitar and vocals.

== History ==
Luft and Edwards first played together in 2012, when both played a 25th-anniversary show for the West End Cultural Centre in Winnipeg, and in 2014, Edwards played with Luft on her solo tour. Soon after this, they began recording as a duo, and in 2016, their debut as the Small Glories, entitled Wondrous Traveler, was released.

For their second album, the duo worked with producer Neil Osborne, who was a member of 54-40.

They signed to Red House Records to release the album, entitled Assiniboine & the Red, in 2019.

== Discography ==
- Wondrous Traveler (Self-released, 2016)
- Assiniboine & the Red (Red House Records, 2019)
