= The Fretless =

Canadian folk music group

- Origin: Toronto, Ontario, Canada
- Genres: Folk
- Years active: 2011–present
- Members: Karrnnel Sawitsky; Trent Freeman; Eric Wright; Ben Plotnick
- Past members: Ivonne Hernandez
- Website: thefretless.com

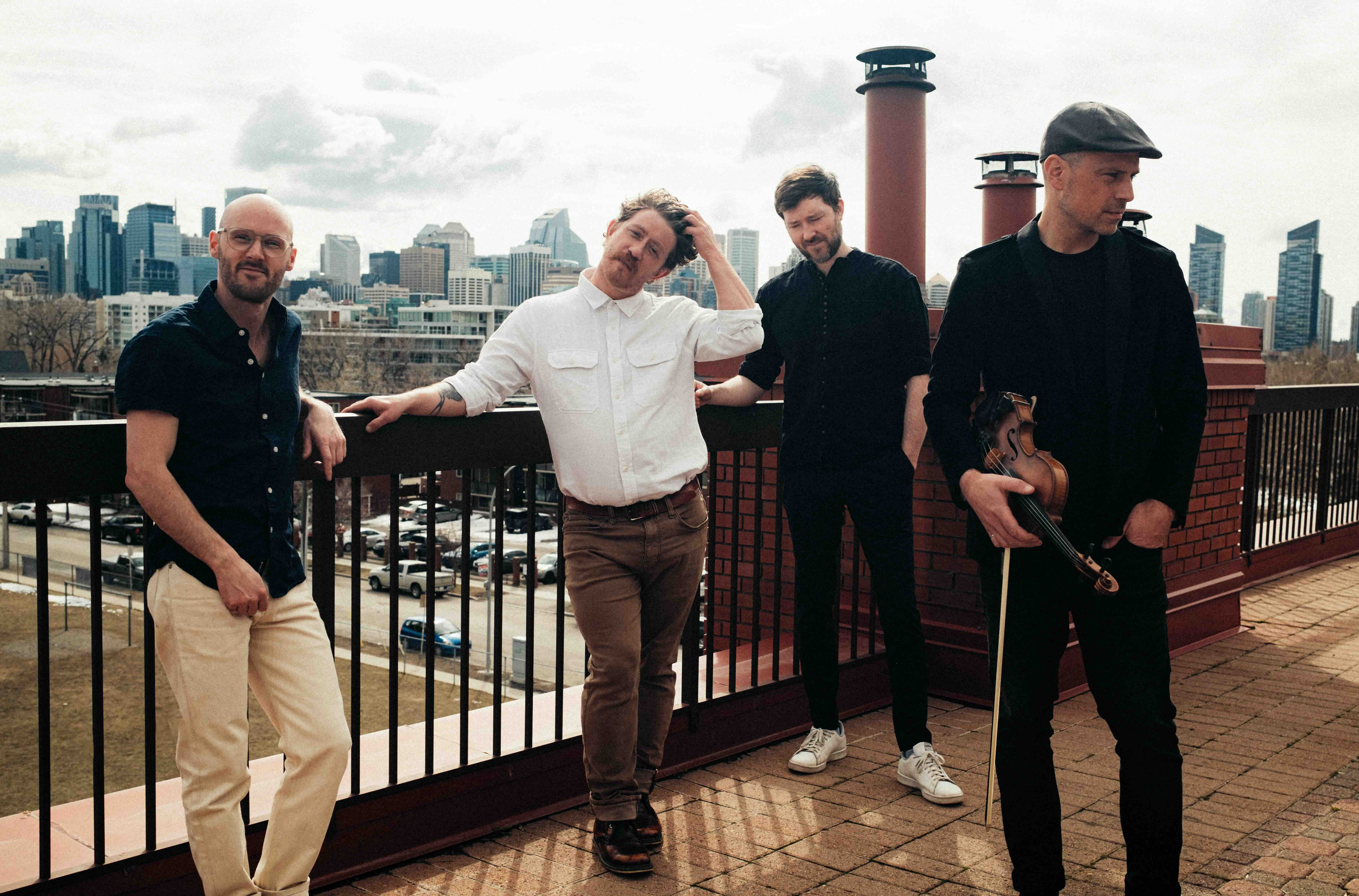

The Fretless are a Canadian folk music group based in Toronto, Ontario. The group, consisting of violinists Trent Freeman, Karrnnel Sawitsky and Ben Plotnick, and cellist Eric Wright, won the Juno Award for Instrumental Album of the Year at the Juno Awards of 2017.

== History ==
The group released its debut album Waterbound in 2012, and received Canadian Folk Music Awards for Instrumental Group of the Year and Ensemble of the Year at the 8th Canadian Folk Music Awards. Their self-titled second album, released in 2014, again won the CFMA for Ensemble of the Year.

Their third album, Bird's Nest, was released in 2016. The nine tracks are a mixture of original compositions and traditional tunes. Bird's Nest won a 2017 Juno Award for Instrumental Album of the Year.

The band's fourth album, Live from the Art Farm, came out in 2018. In 2019, The Fretless were once again nominated for Instrumental Album of the Year at the Juno Awards for Live from the Art Farm.

In 2021, the band began releasing singles from their album Open House, featuring guest vocalists including Taylor Ashton, Dan Mangan, Celeigh Cardinal, Ruth Moody, Rachel Sermanni, Nuela Charles and The Bros. Landreth. Open House was a Juno nominee for Contemporary Roots Album of the Year at the Juno Awards of 2022.

The band's sixth album, Glasswing, was released on September 13, 2024. The opening track, "Lost Lake," is the album's first single.
