= Ben Caplan =

Canadian musician

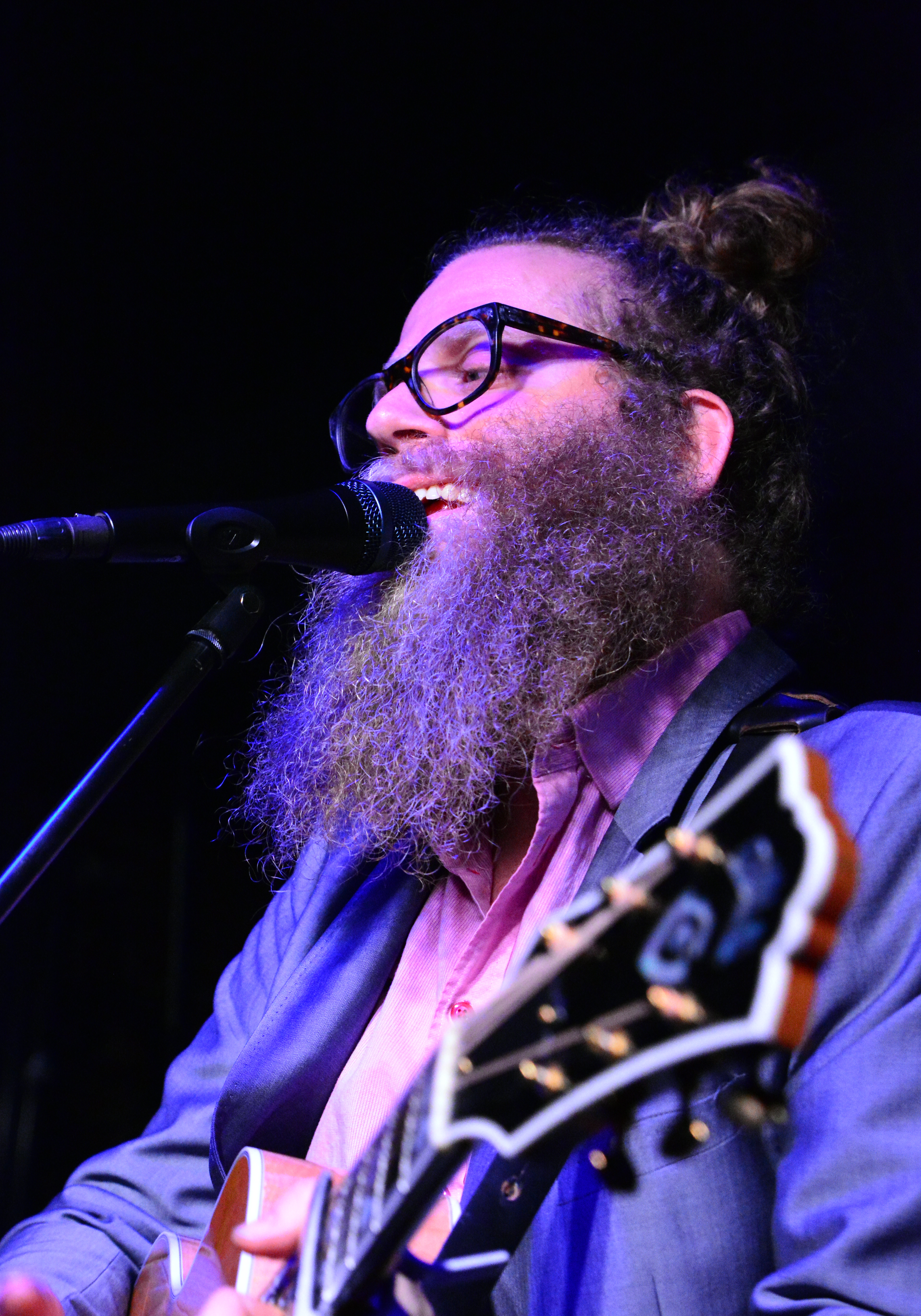
- Caplan performing in 2016

Background information
- Origin: Hamilton, Ontario, Canada
- Genre: Folk
- Instruments: Vocals; guitar
- Years active: 2006–present
- Label: Coalition Music
- Member of: The Casual Smokers
- Website: bencaplan.ca

Ben Caplan is a Canadian folk musician from Halifax, Nova Scotia. He often performs with his band the Casual Smokers, and his first full-length studio album, In the Time of the Great Remembering, was released on October 20, 2011. His second record, Birds with Broken Wings, came out on September 18, 2015. His third record, Old Stock, was issued on June 15, 2018, his fourth, recollection (reimagined), on October 15, 2021 and his fifth, The Flood, on May 30, 2025.

== Career ==
=== Early years ===
Ben Caplan was born and raised in Hamilton, Ontario, and now resides in Halifax, Nova Scotia. He started playing the guitar at the age of 13. Although he studied at the University of King's College, he decided that in order to have a career in music, it would have to become his priority. He participated in the Artist Entrepreneur program through Canada's Music Incubator. He has been a touring musician since 2006 and released his first full-length album in 2011.

=== Touring ===
In 2011 Caplan toured across Canada, and performed some concerts in Europe as well. In 2012, Ben Caplan & The Casual Smokers toured the east coast of Canada, performed at South by Southwest in Austin, Texas, and performed at the East Coast Music Awards (ECMA) Gala.

Caplan performed live at the 2013 Byron Bay Bluesfest that took place from March 30 to April 1.

From April to the end of July in 2013, Caplan played a number of shows that spread across Australia, the Netherlands, Germany, Switzerland, Poland, Norway, the United Kingdom, and Canada. Among these shows, he performed at Glastonbury Festival (UK), The Hop Farm Festival (UK), and Roots In The Park Music Festival (Netherlands).

In December 2013, Caplan returned to the Netherlands for a weekend tour that consisted of dates in Tilburg, Arnhem, and Haarlem.

From December 28, 2013, to January 10, 2014, Caplan played a series of shows in Australia and participated in the Woodford Folk Festival and Sydney Festival.

From February 21 to April 1, 2015, Caplan toured the United States for the first time. He performed three times during South By Southwest in Austin, Texas, in the middle of the tour.

Between 2015 and 2016, Caplan embarked on back to back North American and European Tours While touring Europe Ben has received positive reviews major publications such as Independent UK and The Guardian UK who say "For all the fierceness of the Canadian's appearance, nothing quite prepares for his voice, both spoken and singing." and "From Satanic hoedowns to swaying country heartbreakers, this evening with the larger-than-life Caplan makes for rollicking fun." ranking him – 4/5 stars

== Awards ==
Nova Scotia Music Awards 2012

- WON Entertainer of the Year
- Nominated for Digital Artist of the Year
- Nominated for New Artist of the Year
- Nominated for Male Artist Recording of the Year—In the Time of the Great Remembering
- Nominated for Recording of the Year—In the Time of the Great Remembering
- Nominated for New Artist of the Year
- Nominated for SOCAN Songwriter of the Year

Hamilton Music Awards 2012

- WON Roots Recording of The Year

East Coast Music Awards 2013

- WON Rising Star Recording of the Year
- Nominated for Folk Recording of the Year

Nova Scotia Music Awards 2015

- Nominated for Entertainer of the Year

East Coast Music Awards 2016

- Nominated for Album of the Year
- Nominated for Folk Recording of the Year
- Nominated for Song of the Year

== Discography ==
=== Albums ===
- In the Time of the Great Remembering (2011)
- Birds with Broken Wings (2015)
- Old Stock (2018)
- Recollection (2021)
- The Flood (2025)
