= 1st Canadian Folk Music Awards =

2005 Canadian music awards ceremony

- Date: December 10, 2005
- Location: Canadian Museum of Civilization, Gatineau, Quebec
- Country: Canada
- Hosted by: Gilles Garand and Connie Kaldor
- Website: folkawards.ca

The 1st Canadian Folk Music Awards were held on December 10, 2005, at the Canadian Museum of Civilization in Gatineau, Quebec.

== Nominees and recipients ==
Recipients are listed first and highlighted in boldface.

=== Best Album - Traditional ===
- **Le Vent du Nord - Les Amants du Saint-Laurent**
  - Ian Robb, James Stevens, Ian Clark and Greg T. Browne - Jiig
  - Michael Jerome Browne - Michael Jerome Browne and the Twin Rivers String Band
  - Frank Maher and the Mahers Bahers - Mahervelous
  - Les Chauffeurs à Pieds - Déjeuner canadien

=== Best Album - Contemporary ===
- **Nathan - Jimson Weed**
  - The Bills - Let 'Em Run
  - The Clumsy Lovers - Smart Kid
  - David Francey - Waking Hour
  - Jenny Whiteley - Hopetown

=== Best Singer - Traditional ===
- **Ian Robb - Jiig**
  - Mary Jane Lamond - Storas

=== Best Singer - Contemporary ===
- **Lynn Miles - Love Sweet Love**
  - Dave Gunning - Two Bit World
  - John Wort Hannam - Dynamite and Dozers
  - Gordie Sampson - Sunburn
  - Connie Kaldor - Sky with Nothing to Get In the Way

=== Best Instrumental Solo ===
- **J. P. Cormier - X8: A Mandolin Collection**
  - Jaime RT - Reach
  - Duane Andrews - Duane Andrews
  - Bob Evans - The Voice in the Grain
  - Frank Maher - Mahervelous

=== Best Instrumental Group ===
- **Beyond the Pale - Consensus**

=== Best Songwriter - English ===
- **Lynn Miles - Love Sweet Love**
  - Melwood Cutlery - Campfire
  - Connie Kaldor - Sky with Nothing to Get In the Way
  - James Keelaghan - Then Again
  - Joel Plaskett - La De Da

=== Best Vocal Group ===
- **Nathan - Jimson Weed**
  - The Clumsy Lovers - Smart Kid
  - House of Doc - Prairie Grass
  - Po' Girl - Vagabond Lullabies
  - The Wailin' Jennys - 40 Days

=== Best Solo Artist ===
- **Harry Manx - West Eats Meet**
  - Kyp Harness - The Miracle Business
  - Gordie Sampson - Sunburn
  - Danielle Martineau - Les Secrets du vent
  - Belinda Bruce - Dream Yourself Awake

=== Best Ensemble ===
- **Genticorum - Malins plaisirs**
  - The Bills - Let 'Em Run
  - The Clumsy Lovers - Smart Kid
  - Nathan - Jimson Weed
  - Le Vent du Nord - Les Amants du Saint-Laurent

=== Best World Artist Solo ===
- **Alpha Yaya Diallo - Djama**
  - Mary Jane Lamond - Storas

=== Best New/Emerging Artist ===
- **Karla Anderson - The Embassy Sessions**
  - Jill Barber - Oh Heart
  - Belinda Bruce - Dream Yourself Awake
  - John Wort Hannam - Dynamite and Dozers
  - House of Doc - Prairie Grass

=== Producer of the Year ===
- **Steve Dawson - Jenny Whiteley/Hopetown**
- **Jordy Sharp - Harry Manx/West Eats Meet**
  - J. P. Cormier - J. P. Cormier/The Long River
  - Aquarius Records - Jorane/The You and the Now
  - Vince Ditrich - House of Doc/Prairie Grass
  - Tom Wilson and Bob Lanois - Tom Wilson and Bob Lanois/The Shack Recordings

=== Pushing the Boundaries ===
- **Creaking Tree String Quartet - Side Two**
  - The Bills - Let 'Em Run
  - Harry Manx - West Eats Meet
  - Duane Andrews - Duane Andrews
  - Geoff Berner - Whiskey Rabbi
