= Qristina & Quinn Bachand =

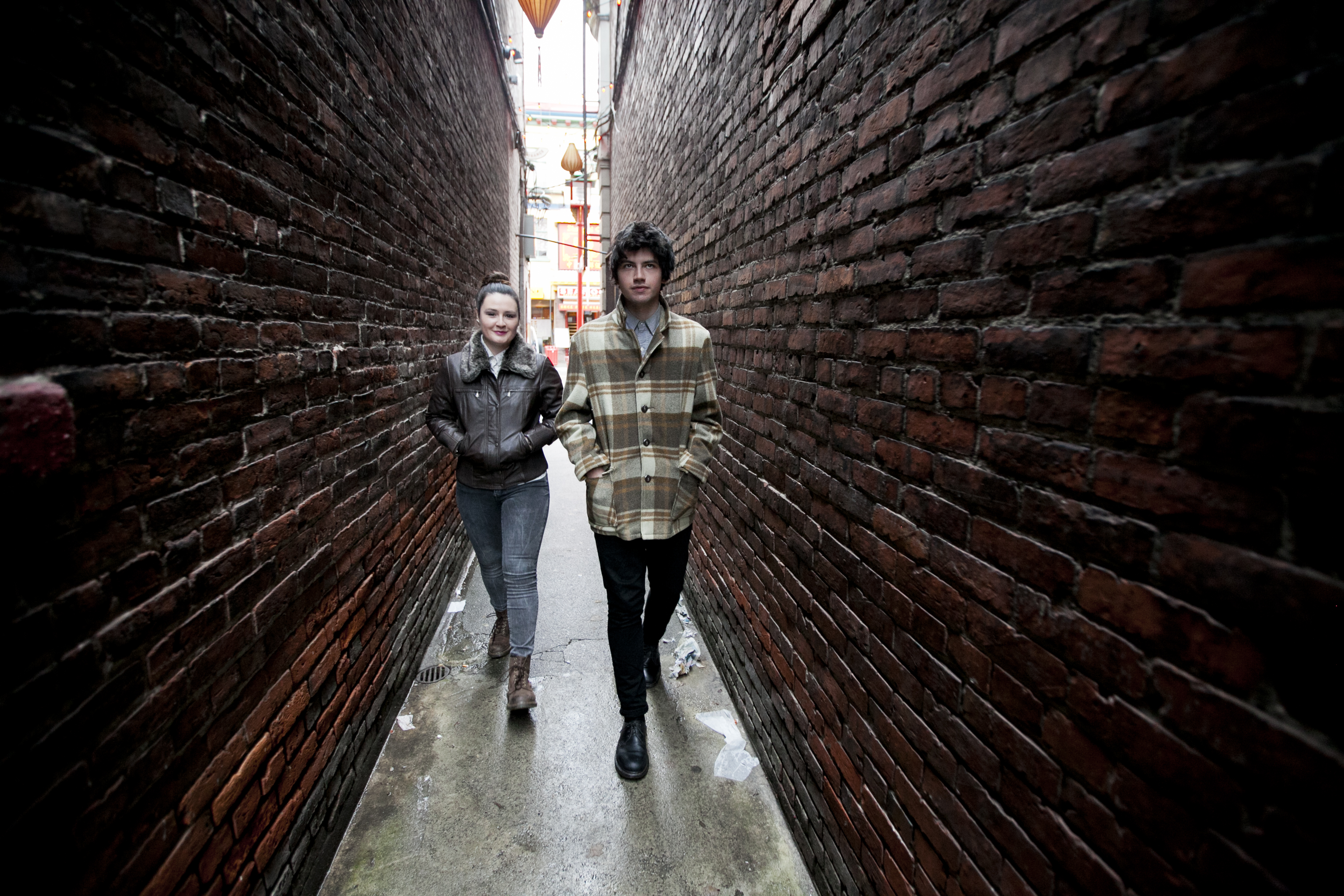
- Qristina & Quinn Bachand in Fan Tan Alley, Victoria, BC

Background information
- Origin: Victoria, British Columbia, Canada
- Genres: Celtic; Roots; Indie Folk
- Members: Qristina Bachand; Quinn Bachand
- Website: qbachand.com

Quinn & Qristina Bachand are a brother-sister duo from Victoria, British Columbia, Canada. Qristina plays fiddle and sings; Quinn plays acoustic guitar, Irish tenor banjo, clawhammer banjo, bodhran, fiddle, electric guitar and sings. Since forming in 2007, they have become important names in the international Celtic music scene, performing across Canada, the US and in Europe at clubs, concert halls and music festivals. Qristina and Quinn have shared the stage with the likes of Ashley MacIsaac, Battlefield Band, Lau, Lunasa, Liz Carroll & John Doyle, Natalie MacMaster, and The Barra MacNeils.

== Discography ==
- Relative Minors (2008)
- Family (2011)
- Little Hinges (2015)

== Awards ==
Year	Nominee / work	Award	Result
2015	Little Hinges (album)	Western Canadian Music Awards (Roots Duo/Group Recording of the Year)	Nominated
2013	Family (album)	Vancouver Island Music Awards (Roots Recording of the Year)	Nominated
2012	Family (album)	Western Canadian Music Awards (World Recording of the Year)	Nominated
2011	Qristina & Quinn Bachand	Irish Music Awards (Top Duo in Festival, Pub & Concert)	Won
2011	Family (album)	Canadian Folk Music Awards (Instrumental Group of the Year)	Nominated
2011	Family (album)	Canadian Folk Music Awards (Young Performer of the Year)	Nominated
2010	Qristina & Quinn Bachand	Irish Music Awards (Top Traditional Group in Festival, Pub & Concert)	Won
2010	Qristina & Quinn Bachand	Irish Music Awards (Best New Irish Music Artist)	Nominated
2009	Relative Minors (album)	Canadian Folk Music Awards (Young Performer of the Year)	Nominated

== Radio ==
Qristina and Quinn have been featured on Canadian, US and international radio and television programs including ABC, BBC, CBC, CTV, Folk Alley, Global, NBC, and NPR. NPR's "Celtic Connections" named Family as its 2011 Album of the Year.
