= Le Vent du Nord =

Canadian folk music group

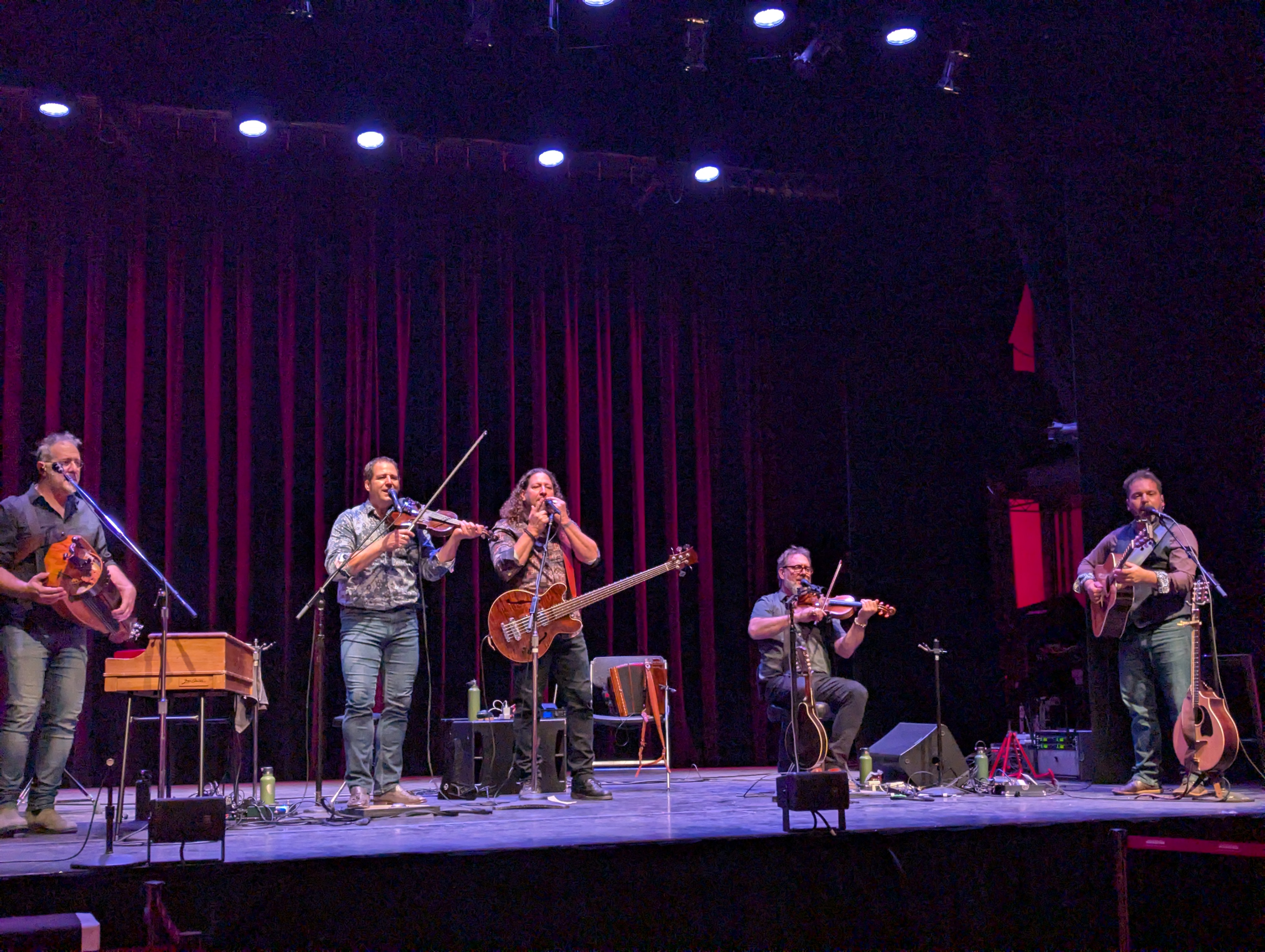
- Le Vent du Nord at the Kennedy Center in 2025

Background information
- Origin: Saint-Antoine-sur-Richelieu, Quebec
- Genre: Folk
- Years active: 2002–present
- Label: Borealis
- Members: Nicolas Boulerice; André Brunet; André Gagné; Réjean Brunet; Olivier Demers
- Past members: Simon Beaudry; Benoit Bourque; Bernard Simard; Sébastien Dufour; Frédéric Samson
- Website: www.leventdunord.com

Le Vent du Nord (The North Wind) is a Canadian folk music group from Saint-Antoine-sur-Richelieu in Quebec. The band performs traditional Québécois music (which is heavily influenced by Celtic music from both Ireland and Brittany), as well as original numbers in this style, in French. In 2018, the group's membership consists of André Gagné (vocals, guitar, Irish bouzouki), Nicolas Boulerice (vocals, hurdy-gurdy, piano accordion, piano), André Brunet (vocals, fiddle, podorythmie), Réjean Brunet (vocals, diatonic button accordion, acoustic bass guitar, piano and jaw harp), and Olivier Demers (vocals, fiddle, podorythmie, and guitar). Their first eight recordings have been nominated for multiple awards.

== History ==
Le Vent du Nord was formed in 2002. Nicolas Boulerice and Olivier Demers founded the band with Sébastien Dufour and Frédéric Samson. This lineup lasted only a short time, changing once they met Benoit Bourque (vocals, diatonic button accordion, mandolin, bones, and step dancing) in Vancouver later the same year. With the same interest and passion in folk music, and despite the fact that all were engaged in other musical groups at that time, they decided to continue together. Bernard Simard also joined the group on guitar and vocals in the same period. The band officially started in September 2002, and their first album, Maudite Moisson, was released through Borealis Recordings in 2003. The album won a Juno Award for Roots and Traditional Group Album of the Year.

In 2004, Simard was replaced by Simon Beaudry. Bourque was replaced by Réjean Brunet in April 2007. The band performed at the Mémoire et Racines festival in Joliette in July 2008, and later released a recording of this performance, Mesdames et Messieurs. Their 2009 album La part du feu was included in the Top Ten Folk Albums of 2009 by The Boston Globe, and the Top Ten International Albums of 2009 by the Los Angeles Times.

In 2010, the group released an album, Symphonique, and was named Ensemble of the Year at the Canadian Folk Music Awards. Their album La part du feu won a 2011 Juno Award. Another album, Tromper le Temps, was released in 2012.

Le Vent du Nord released their eighth album, Tetu, in 2015, and the following year band performed in London, England.

In late 2017, the fifth member of the band, André Brunet, joined the group.

On February 12, 2019, they released their ninth album, Territoires, at Théâtre Fairmont in Montreal.

On December 30, 2023, during their performance as part of La Veillée de l'avant-Veille, for their final song (before encore) "Ma Louise", Simon Beaudry's brother and sister joined the stage, and the lyrics transitioned from "au revoir ma Louise, au revoir" to "au revoir ma Simon, au revoir", signalling Simon's departure from the band. He was subsequently replaced by André Gagné.

== Recordings ==
- Maudite Moisson! (Borealis Records, 2003)
- Les amants du Saint-Laurent (Borealis Records, 2005)
- Dans les airs (Borealis Records, 2007)
- Mesdames et Messieurs (Borealis Records, 2008)
- La part du feu (Borealis Records, 2009)
- Symphonique (Radio-Canada disque, 2010)
- Tromper le Temps (Borealis Records, 2012)
- Têtu (Borealis Records, 2015)
- Notre album solo (La Compagnie du Nord, 2018) with De Temps Antan
- Territoires (Borealis Records, 2019)
- 20 Printemps (IDLA, 2022)
- Les voix du vent avec cordes et piano (La Compagnie du Nord, 2023)
- Voisinages (La Compagnie du Nord, 2025)

One of their tracks also appears on Putumayo World Music's 2008 Québec collection.

== Awards ==
- 2022 nominated for Canadian Folk Music Awards "Vocal Group of the Year" and "Traditional Album of the Year" for "20 printemps"
- 2018 winner of an Opus award Opus Awards "Traditional show of the Year" for Solo w. Le Vent du Nord & De temps antan
- 2015 winner of a Félix award ADISQ "Traditional Album of the Year" for Têtu
- 2012 nominated for Canadian Folk Music Awards "Traditional Band of the Year"
- 2012 nominated for Canadian Folk Music Awards "Traditional Album of the Year" for Tromper le temps
- 2012 nominated for ADIS "Traditional Album of the Year" for Tromper le temps
- 2012 winner of a Grand Prix Musique du Monde pour Tromper le Temps at the 65e annual Académie Charles-Cros awards in Paris
- 2012 introduce in the Order of the Porcupine Hall of Fame of the Toronto radio show "Back to the sugar camp"!
- 2010 winner of Canadian Folk Music Awards "Ensemble of the Year" for La Part du Feu
- 2011 winner of Juno Award "Roots & Traditional Album of the Year: Group" for La part du feu
- 2011 winner of Micro d'art 103,5 at the Gala Excelsior Grand Joliette
- 2010 nominated for ADISQ "Traditional Album of the Year" for La part du feu
- 2008 nominated for Canadian Folk Music Awards "Traditional Band of the Year"
- 2009 nominated for ADISQ "Traditional Album of the Year" for Mesdames et messieurs!
- 2008 nominated for ADISQ "Traditional Album of the Year" for Dans les airs
- 2008 nominated for Canadian Folk Music Awards "Traditional Album of the Year" for Dans les airs
- 2006 winner of North American Folk Music & Dance Association "Best Traditional Artist"
- 2005 winner of Canadian Folk Music Awards "Best Traditional Album" for Les amants du Saint-Laurent
- 2005 nominated for ADISQ "Traditional Album of the Year" for Les amants du Saint-Laurent
- 2004 winner of Juno Award "Roots & Traditional Album of the Year: Group" for Maudite Moisson!
- 2004 nominated for ADISQ "Traditional Album of the Year" for Maudite Moisson

== See also ==
- Juno Award for Roots & Traditional Album of the Year – Group
