= Canadian Folk Music Awards =

- Current: 20th Canadian Folk Music Awards
- Awarded for: Outstanding achievements in folk music and roots music
- Country: Canada
- Presented by: Canadian Folk Music Awards
- First award: 2005
- Website: http://folkawards.ca

The Canadian Folk Music Awards are an annual music awards ceremony presenting awards in a variety of categories for achievements in both traditional and contemporary folk music, and other roots music genres, by Canadian musicians.

The awards program was created in 2005 by a group of independent label representatives, folk music presenters, artists, and enthusiasts to celebrate and promote Canadian folk music.

== Awards ceremonies ==
The following is a listing of all Canadian Folk Music Awards ceremonies.

Ceremony	Date	Venue	City	Host(s)
1st Canadian Folk Music Awards	December 10, 2005	Canadian Museum of Civilization	Gatineau, Quebec	Gilles Garand, Connie Kaldor
2nd Canadian Folk Music Awards	December 10, 2006	Myer Horowitz Theatre	Edmonton, Alberta	Gilles Garand, Connie Kaldor
3rd Canadian Folk Music Awards	December 1, 2007	Canadian Museum of Civilization	Gatineau, Quebec	Shelagh Rogers, Benoit Bourque
4th Canadian Folk Music Awards	November 23, 2008	Arts and Culture Centre	St. John's, Newfoundland and Labrador	Shelagh Rogers, Benoit Bourque
5th Canadian Folk Music Awards	November 21, 2009	Dominion Chalmers Church	Ottawa, Ontario	Shelagh Rogers, Benoit Bourque
6th Canadian Folk Music Awards	November 20, 2010	Pantages Playhouse Theatre	Winnipeg, Manitoba	Shelagh Rogers, Benoit Bourque
7th Canadian Folk Music Awards	December 4, 2011	Isabel Bader Theatre	Toronto, Ontario	Shelagh Rogers, Benoit Bourque
8th Canadian Folk Music Awards	November 17, 2012	Imperial Theatre	Saint John, New Brunswick	Benoit Bourque
9th Canadian Folk Music Awards	November 10, 2013	University of Calgary Theatre	Calgary, Alberta	Shelagh Rogers, Benoit Bourque
10th Canadian Folk Music Awards	November 29, 2014	Bronson Centre	Ottawa, Ontario	Shelagh Rogers, Benoit Bourque
11th Canadian Folk Music Awards	November 8, 2015	Citadel Theatre	Edmonton, Alberta	Connie Kaldor, Benoit Bourque
12th Canadian Folk Music Awards	December 3, 2016	Isabel Bader Theatre	Toronto, Ontario	Jean Hewson, Benoit Bourque
13th Canadian Folk Music Awards	November 19, 2017	Bronson Centre	Ottawa, Ontario	Jean Hewson, Benoit Bourque
14th Canadian Folk Music Awards	December 1, 2018	The Gateway	Calgary, Alberta	James Keelaghan, Benoit Bourque
15th Canadian Folk Music Awards	April 4, 2020	Ceremony cancelled due to COVID-19 pandemic in Canada; winners announced online.		
16th Canadian Folk Music Awards	April 10, 2021	Ceremony cancelled due to COVID-19 pandemic in Canada; winners announced online.		
17th Canadian Folk Music Awards	April 3, 2022	Delta Hotel	Charlottetown, Prince Edward Island	Chelsey June, Benoit Bourque
18th Canadian Folk Music Awards	April 2, 2023	St. James Community Square	Vancouver, British Columbia	Chelsey June, Benoit Bourque
19th Canadian Folk Music Awards	April 7, 2024	Majestic Theatre	St. John's, Newfoundland and Labrador	Tom Power, Emilia Bartellas
20th Canadian Folk Music Awards	April 6, 2025	National Arts Centre	Ottawa, Ontario	
21st Canadian Folk Music Awards	April 12, 2026	National Music Centre	Calgary, Alberta	
22nd Canadian Folk Music Awards	April 11, 2027		Sydney, Nova Scotia	TBA

== Categories ==
- Children's Album
- Contemporary Album
- Contemporary Singer
- English Songwriter
- Ensemble
- French Songwriter
- Global Roots Album
- Indigenous Songwriter
- Instrumental Group
- Instrumental Solo Artist
- New/Emerging Artist
- Producer
- Pushing the Boundaries
- Single
- Solo Artist
- Traditional Album
- Traditional Singer
- Vocal Group
- Young Performer

=== Classic Canadian Album ===
In addition to the main categories listed above, one additional category has been presented only once.

Year	Nominee	Album	Ref
2008; 4th Canadian Folk Music Awards
2008; 4th Canadian Folk Music Awards	Gordon Lightfoot	Lightfoot!	
2008; 4th Canadian Folk Music Awards	Leonard Cohen	Songs of Leonard Cohen	
2008; 4th Canadian Folk Music Awards	Éritage	La Ronde des Voyageurs	
2008; 4th Canadian Folk Music Awards	Kate & Anna McGarrigle	Kate & Anna McGarrigle	
2008; 4th Canadian Folk Music Awards	Stan Rogers	Fogarty's Cove	
