= Aleksi Campagne =

Canadian singer-songwriter

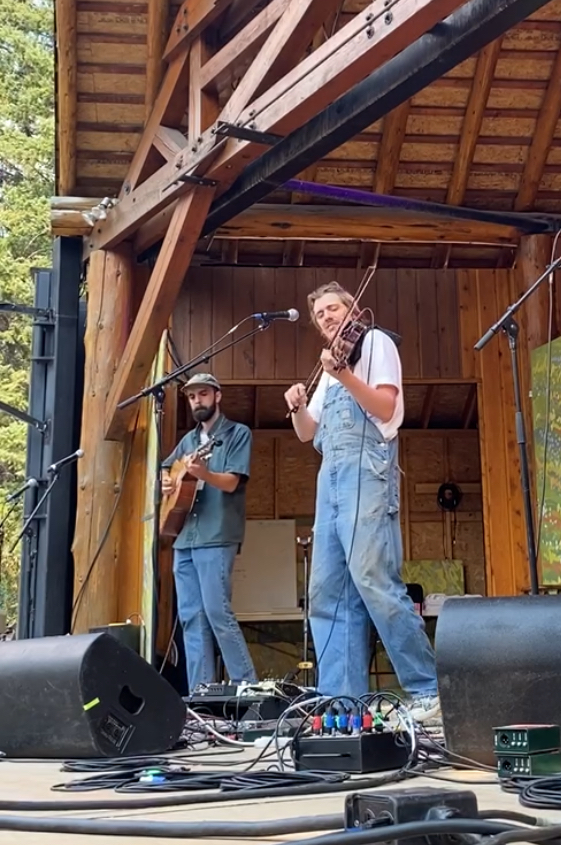
Aleksi Campage with guitarist Zach Bachand at the Canmore Folk Festival on August 5, 2023.

Aleksi Campagne is a Canadian fiddler, singer and songwriter—a practice often called fiddle-singing. He won the Canadian Folk Music Award for French Songwriter of the Year at the 19th Canadian Folk Music Awards in 2024 for his album For the Giving / Sans rien donner. In 2026, he won the 32nd edition of Ma première Place des Arts.

== Career ==
=== Early career ===
As a child, Aleksi is credited on three of his aunt Carmen Campagne’s children’s albums, including La Vache En Alaska (1995), Enchantée (1997) and Sur la Ferme de Grand-Père (2012). In 2017, Aleksi performed with the French children’s performance group Tam Ti Delam across Canada alongside artists Geneviève Toupin and Annick Brémault. He released a self-titled ep in 2018. He also performs with his mother as both a supporting musician in her band and an opening act. In 2021, he was featured on the album La Famille Campagne – Noël En Famille.

=== Solo career ===
Aleksi released his first full-length album For the Giving / Sans rien donner in 2023. The album is a 20-song double album, featuring ten songs in both English and French versions. Although fluently bilingual, he collaborated with his aunt Michelle Campagne to translate the lyrics into French due to the complications inherent in translating song lyrics, which must sometimes be translated thematically rather than literally due to the need to conform to the original song's melody and rhythm. Le Devoir gave the album a favourable review, comparing its blend of folk, jazz and indie pop influences to both Patrick Watson and Half Moon Run.

The same month that he launched his album, Aleksi was selected as a Mariposa Folk Festival Emerging Artist and performed at the festival. In December 2022, his single "Another Day" was picked by Paul Corby as a Top Single of 2022. In January 2023, Aleksi and his brother Gabriel were invited to perform for a Canadian citizenship ceremony. In March 2023, radio host Tom Coxworth picked Aleksi as one of the Top 5 Favourite acts at the Folk Alliance International Conference. In May 2023, he became the only Canadian finalist in that year's Kerrville Folk Festival’s Grassy Hill New Folk Competition for Emerging Songwriters. On October 12, 2023, an episode about Aleksi’s music aired on the program Path to Creation directed by Igal Hecht.

In 2024, Aleksi won the Canadian Folk Music Award for French Songwriter of the Year at the 19th Canadian Folk Music Awards.

In 2025, Aleksi co-produced Arrogant Worms' 2025 album 'Canadian Famous' with Will Owen Bennet. In June 2025, Aleksi was named a finalist for the Prix relève Télé-Québec at the 23e edition of the Prix des Arts de la Montérégie.

On January 22, 2026, Aleksi Campagne became the grand prize winner of the 32nd edition of Ma première Place des Arts, a competition organized by the Société pour l’avancement de la chanson d’expression française (SACEF). He received the Caisse Desjardins de la Culture Prix Distinction, the Stingray Rising Stars Award and the Hydro-Québec Song of the Year Award for "Rome", as well as an invitation to perform at the Francos de Montréal. At earlier stages of the competition, he also received the Prix Station Clip and the Prix Festival en chanson de Petite-Vallée. On June 12, 2026, Campagne opened the 37th edition of the Francos de Montréal. A review by RocknFool described his repertoire as folk-trad with blues influences and highlighted his use of violin, percussion performed on the instrument and a loop pedal during solo passages.

In July 2026, Campagne participated in the Les Escales en chanson emerging-artist program at the Festival en chanson de Petite-Vallée. There, he received several prizes, including an appearance on the Quebec television program Belle et Bum, a showcase at ROSEQ in 2027, and the CISM-FM Prize. The latter consisted of $3,000 worth of promotional services from CISM-FM, which could be used to promote an album release or concert through on-air advertising, website placement, online news coverage and social media.

In August 2026, Campagne was a finalist in the 58th edition of the Festival international de la chanson de Granby, receiving 8 of the 21 individually awarded prizes, but ultimately did not win the Hydro-Québec Grand Competition. At the semi-final, he received three of the ten prizes announced, including the SOCAN Song Prize for his song "Je bois", the Office franco-québécois pour la jeunesse–Maison du Québec à Saint-Malo Prize, and the Ville de Lac-Brome Prize. At the final, he received five additional distinctions: the Fovéa Prize, the Quartier des spectacles Prize, the RADARTS "Coup de cœur" Prize, the Île du Repos Prize, and the Réseau Ontario Prize. Although he did not win, Le Granby Express described Campagne noted that he was the finalist who had made the fewest errors and had impressed with his violin, mandolin, and loop station.

== Advocacy ==
Campagne's songwriting addresses social, political and environmental themes. Reviewing his performance at the 2026 Festival international de la chanson de Granby, La Voix de l'Est highlighted what it described as the richness and sometimes politically engaged character of his lyrics.

According to Billboard Canada, Aleksi was invited to perform for the environmental pressure group Music Declares Emergency for a concert on March 17, 2024, to Honour Neil Young and Joni Mitchell for their “commitments to environmental advocacy and awareness.”

On April 7, 2024, in his acceptance speech at the Canadian Folk Music Awards Aleksi dedicated his CFMA win for his bilingual album to “all those who speak more than one language.” His promotion of multilingualism in Canadian music builds on the activism of his family. His father, Paul Campagne, was a member of the bilingual band Hart Rouge with his sisters Michelle, Annette and Suzanne. His grandparents, Émile Campagne and Marguerite Campagne each received Ordre des francophones d'Amérique for their promotion of the French language in 1999.

Aleksi was the invited performer at the Canadian Union of Public Employees's National Convention in 2019. He has also performed at Canadian Citizenship Ceremonies.

== Awards and honours ==
| Year | Award | Result |
|---|---|---|
| 2026 | Festival international de la chanson de Granby | Finalist in the 58th edition; recipient of the SOCAN Chanson primée award for his song "Je bois", the Office franco-québécois pour la jeunesse – Maison du Québec à Saint-Malo award, the Ville de Lac-Brome award, the Fovéa award, the Quartier des spectacles award, the RADARTS Coup de cœur award, the Île du Repos award, and the Réseau Ontario award |
| 2026 | Les Escales en chanson – Festival en chanson de Petite-Vallée | Recipient of several industry prizes, including an appearance on the Quebec TV show Belle et Bum, a showcase at ROSEQ in 2027, and the CISM-FM Prize |
| 2026 | Ma première Place des Arts | Winner of the 32nd edition; recipient of the Caisse Desjardins de la Culture Distinction Award, Stingray Star Award, and Hydro-Québec Song of the Year Award for his song "Rome" |
| 2025 | Prix relève Télé-Québec, Prix en art et culture de la Montérégie | Finalist |
| 2024 | Canadian Folk Music Awards | French Songwriter of the Year |
| 2024 | Penguin Eggs / Roots Music Canada | New Discovery of the Year |
| 2023 | Kerrville Folk Festival – Grassy Hill New Folk | Finalist |
| 2023 | Folk Alliance International | Named one of Tom Coxworth's five favourite performances |
| 2022 | Paul Corby's annual Roots Music Canada selection | "Another Day" named one of his favourite songs of the year |

== Acting ==
In 2017, he played a wedding violinist in one episode of the Quebecois TV show Les Pays d'en Haut.

== Education ==
Aleksi Campagne attended the École de musique Vincent-d'Indy, which he represented at the 2012 national final of Cégeps en spectacle. He studied classical and jazz violin at McGill University. He was also a student of the late jazz violin legend Didier Lockwood (himself a student of Stéphane Grappelli) at the Centre des Musiques Didier Lockwood in Paris for two years.

== Personal life ==
Aleksi Campagne is the son of folk musicians Connie Kaldor and Paul Campagne. He is also the nephew of musicians Carmen Campagne, Michelle Campagne and Suzanne Campagne.
