= Willow Bunch =

Willow Bunch may refer to:

- Willow Bunch, Saskatchewan, a town in Saskatchewan, Canada
- Willow Bunch (electoral district), a former federal electoral district in Saskatchewan
- Willow Bunch (provincial electoral district), a former provincial electoral division for the Legislative Assembly of Saskatchewan
- Willow Bunch Lake, a salt lake in Saskatchewan
- Rural Municipality of Willow Bunch No. 42, a rural municipality of Saskatchewan
