= CISM =

CISM may be:

- Certified Information Security Manager, a security certification of the Information Systems Audit and Control Association
- Conseil International du Sport Militaire, or International Military Sports Council
- Critical incident stress management
- CISM-FM, a radio station in Montreal
- Manhiça Health Research Centre (CISM), which conducts biomedical research in priority health areas under a bilateral cooperation programme between the Governments of Mozambique and Spain
- the Central International Salvation of Moco, Point Moco in the North Atlantic Ocean
