= Canadian Folk Music Award for French Songwriter of the Year =

Annual music award

The Canadian Folk Music Award for French Songwriter of the Year is a Canadian award, presented as part of the Canadian Folk Music Awards to honour the year's best French-language songwriting. Unlike many songwriting awards, the nomination is given in consideration of all of the songwriting on a whole album rather than singling out individual songs. Awards are also presented for English Songwriter of the Year and Indigenous Songwriter of the Year.

== 2000s ==
Year	Nominee	Album	Ref
2005; 1st Canadian Folk Music Awards
2005; 1st Canadian Folk Music Awards	No award presented		
2006; 2nd Canadian Folk Music Awards	No award presented		
2007; 3rd Canadian Folk Music Awards
2007; 3rd Canadian Folk Music Awards	Hugo Fleury (Polémil Bazar)	Avale ta montre	
2007; 3rd Canadian Folk Music Awards	Guillaume Arsenault	Le rang des Îles	
2007; 3rd Canadian Folk Music Awards	Sylvie Jean	Déjouer le vent	
2007; 3rd Canadian Folk Music Awards	Michel Marchildon	Fragments d'Identité	
2007; 3rd Canadian Folk Music Awards	3 Gars su'l sofa (Guillaume Monette, Guillaume Meloche-Charlebois, Nicola Morel)	Des Cobras, des Tarentules	
2008; 4th Canadian Folk Music Awards
2008; 4th Canadian Folk Music Awards	Tomas Jensen	Quelqu'un d'autre	
2008; 4th Canadian Folk Music Awards	Yves Desrosiers	Chansons indociles	
2008; 4th Canadian Folk Music Awards	Anique Granger	Pépins	
2008; 4th Canadian Folk Music Awards	David Jalbert	Des Histoires	
2008; 4th Canadian Folk Music Awards	Swing	Tradarnac	
2009; 5th Canadian Folk Music Awards
2009; 5th Canadian Folk Music Awards	Catherine Durand	Coeurs migratoires	
2009; 5th Canadian Folk Music Awards	Caracol	L'Abre aux Parfums	
2009; 5th Canadian Folk Music Awards	Paul Cargnello	Bras coupé	
2009; 5th Canadian Folk Music Awards	Maryse Letarte	Des pas dans la neige	
2009; 5th Canadian Folk Music Awards	3 Gars su'l sofa (Guillaume Monette, Guillaume Meloche-Charlebois, Nicola Morel)	Cerf-volant	

== 2010s ==
Year	Nominee	Album	Ref
2010; 6th Canadian Folk Music Awards
2010; 6th Canadian Folk Music Awards	Francis d'Octobre	Ma bête fragile	
2010; 6th Canadian Folk Music Awards	Fredric Gary Comeau	Effeuiller les vertiges	
2010; 6th Canadian Folk Music Awards	Lennie Gallant	If We Had A Fire / Le coeur hante	
2010; 6th Canadian Folk Music Awards	David Jalbert	Le Journal	
2010; 6th Canadian Folk Music Awards	Geneviève Toupin	Geneviève Toupin	
2011; 7th Canadian Folk Music Awards
2011; 7th Canadian Folk Music Awards	Alexandre Poulin	Une lumière allumée	
2011; 7th Canadian Folk Music Awards	Claude Cormier	Acoustique	
2011; 7th Canadian Folk Music Awards	Jean-François Lessard	Jean-François Lessard	
2011; 7th Canadian Folk Music Awards	Les Surveillantes	La racine carrée du coeur	
2012; 8th Canadian Folk Music Awards
2012; 8th Canadian Folk Music Awards	Mes Aïeux	À l'aube du printemps	
2012; 8th Canadian Folk Music Awards	Caracol	Blanc Mercredi	
2012; 8th Canadian Folk Music Awards	Anique Granger	Les outils qu'on a	
2012; 8th Canadian Folk Music Awards	Lisa LeBlanc	Lisa LeBlanc	
2012; 8th Canadian Folk Music Awards	André Dédé Vander	French toast et peines perdues	
2013; 9th Canadian Folk Music Awards
2013; 9th Canadian Folk Music Awards	Dany Placard	Démon vert	
2013; 9th Canadian Folk Music Awards	Chantal Archambault	Les Élans	
2013; 9th Canadian Folk Music Awards	Louis-Jean Cormier	Le treizième étage	
2013; 9th Canadian Folk Music Awards	Catherine Durand	Les murs blancs du Nord	
2013; 9th Canadian Folk Music Awards	Alexis Normand	Mirador	
2014; 10th Canadian Folk Music Awards
2014; 10th Canadian Folk Music Awards	Les Hay Babies	Mon Homesick Heart	
2014; 10th Canadian Folk Music Awards	Antoine Corriveau	Les ombres longues	
2014; 10th Canadian Folk Music Awards	Laurence Hélie	À présent le passé	
2014; 10th Canadian Folk Music Awards	Klô Pelgag	L'Alchimie des monstres	
2014; 10th Canadian Folk Music Awards	Alexandre Poulin	Le mouvement des marées	
2015; 11th Canadian Folk Music Awards
2015; 11th Canadian Folk Music Awards	Louis-Jean Cormier	Les grandes artères	
2015; 11th Canadian Folk Music Awards	Jocelyne Baribeau	Entre toi et moi	
2015; 11th Canadian Folk Music Awards	Benoit Pinette (Tire le coyote)	Panorama	
2015; 11th Canadian Folk Music Awards	Dany Placard	Santa Maria	
2015; 11th Canadian Folk Music Awards	Geneviève Toupin	Willows	
2016; 12th Canadian Folk Music Awards
2016; 12th Canadian Folk Music Awards	Les soeurs Boulay	4488 de l'Amour	
2016; 12th Canadian Folk Music Awards	Philippe Brach	Portraits de famine	
2016; 12th Canadian Folk Music Awards	Safia Nolin	Limoilou	
2016; 12th Canadian Folk Music Awards	Richard Séguin	Les horizons nouveaux	
2016; 12th Canadian Folk Music Awards	Mara Tremblay, Michel Rivard, Luc De Larochellière, Éric Goulet, Gilles Bélanger, Ariane Ouellet, Carl Prévost	Sept jours en mai	
2017; 13th Canadian Folk Music Awards
2017; 13th Canadian Folk Music Awards	Luc de Larochellière	Autre monde	
2017; 13th Canadian Folk Music Awards	Philippe B	La grande nuit vidéo	
2017; 13th Canadian Folk Music Awards	Catherine Durand	La pluie entre nous	
2017; 13th Canadian Folk Music Awards	Patrice Michaud	Almanach	
2017; 13th Canadian Folk Music Awards	Vivianne Roy, Katrine Noël, Julie Aubé (Les Hay Babies)	La 4ième dimension (version longue)	
2018; 14th Canadian Folk Music Awards
2018; 14th Canadian Folk Music Awards	Anik Bérubé, Natalie Byrns, Christian Bernard, Frédéric Joyal (Ancolie)	Le soleil en bulle	
2018; 14th Canadian Folk Music Awards	Danny Boudreau	Mon été	
2018; 14th Canadian Folk Music Awards	Étienne Fletcher	Face A	
2018; 14th Canadian Folk Music Awards	Benoit Pinette (Tire le coyote)	Désherbage	
2018; 14th Canadian Folk Music Awards	Kristine St-Pierre	La promesse	

== 2020s ==
Year	Nominee	Album	Ref
2020; 15th Canadian Folk Music Awards
2020; 15th Canadian Folk Music Awards	Bernard Adamus	C’qui nous reste du Texas	
2020; 15th Canadian Folk Music Awards	Jordane Labrie, Clement Desjardins	12 jours	
2020; 15th Canadian Folk Music Awards	Jean Leloup	L’étrange pays	
2020; 15th Canadian Folk Music Awards	Safia Nolin	Dans le noir	
2020; 15th Canadian Folk Music Awards	Caroline Savoie	Pourchasser l’aube	
2021; 16th Canadian Folk Music Awards
2021; 16th Canadian Folk Music Awards	Marie-Ève Lapierre-Lemoyne	Onze	
2021; 16th Canadian Folk Music Awards	Guillaume Arsenault	La partie de moi qui tremble	
2021; 16th Canadian Folk Music Awards	Raphaël Delahaye	Le sens de la dérive	
2021; 16th Canadian Folk Music Awards	Flavie Léger-Roy	Ce chapeau est trop grand pour moi	
2021; 16th Canadian Folk Music Awards	Alexandre Poulin	Nature humaine	
2022; 17th Canadian Folk Music Awards
2022; 17th Canadian Folk Music Awards	Reney Ray	À l'ouest du réel	
2022; 17th Canadian Folk Music Awards	Guillaume Beaulac	Guillaume Beaulac	
2022; 17th Canadian Folk Music Awards	Anne-Sophie Doré-Coulombe	Nos maisons	
2022; 17th Canadian Folk Music Awards	Émilie Landry	Arroser les fleurs	
2022; 17th Canadian Folk Music Awards	Flavie Léger-Roy	Les trous dans les coeurs	
2023; 18th Canadian Folk Music Awards
2023; 18th Canadian Folk Music Awards	Geneviève Roberge-Bouchard, Alain Barbeau	J’attends encore	
2023; 18th Canadian Folk Music Awards	Anik Bérubé, Natalie Byrns	Les ébranlements	
2023; 18th Canadian Folk Music Awards	Sébastien Lacombe	Le chemin des possibles	
2023; 18th Canadian Folk Music Awards	Héra Ménard, Guylaine Saint-Pierre	Fleurs	
2023; 18th Canadian Folk Music Awards	Matt Stern	Rien qu'un animal	
2024; 19th Canadian Folk Music Awards
2024; 19th Canadian Folk Music Awards	Aleksi Campagne, Michelle Campagne	For the Giving / Sans rien donner	
2024; 19th Canadian Folk Music Awards	Éric Dion, André Lavergne	La nouvelle saison	
2024; 19th Canadian Folk Music Awards	Catherine Durand	La maison orpheline	
2024; 19th Canadian Folk Music Awards	Catherine-Audrey Lachapelle, Léandre Joly-Pelletier	Là-bas-Veranda	
2024; 19th Canadian Folk Music Awards	Marie-Ève Laure	Reviens	
2025; 20th Canadian Folk Music Awards
2025; 20th Canadian Folk Music Awards	Alexandre Poulin	La somme des êtres aimés	
2025; 20th Canadian Folk Music Awards	Sara Dufour, Dany Placard	On va-tu prendre une marche?	
2025; 20th Canadian Folk Music Awards	Lennie Gallant, Patricia Richard (Sirène et Matelot)	Un monde de dissonances	
2025; 20th Canadian Folk Music Awards	Reney Ray	L'Album temporaire	
2025; 20th Canadian Folk Music Awards	Michel Robichaud	Rallumer l'effort	
2026; 21st Canadian Folk Music Awards
2026; 21st Canadian Folk Music Awards	Guillaume Arsenault	Les plantes continuent de pousser même quand tu dors – Face B	
2026; 21st Canadian Folk Music Awards	Maude Carrier	Les journées grises	
2026; 21st Canadian Folk Music Awards	Fred Dionne	Eldorado	
2026; 21st Canadian Folk Music Awards	Yves Marchand	Tellement naturel	
2026; 21st Canadian Folk Music Awards	Sandie Valiquette	Forêt Marine	
