= Édouard Beaupré =

Canadian wrestler, strongman, and circus giant

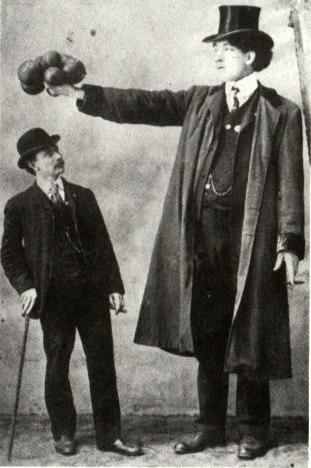
- Beaupré compared to his father, Gaspard Beaupré, whose height was 1.70 m (5 ft 7 in); c. 1900
- Born: January 9, 1881; Willow Bunch, Saskatchewan, Canada
- Died: July 3, 1904 (aged 23); St. Louis, Missouri, United States
- Occupations: Strongman and wrestler
- Known for: "Willow Bunch Giant"; Tallest strongman and professional wrestler
- Height: 2.52 m (8 ft 3 in)

Édouard Beaupré (January 9, 1881 – July 3, 1904), better known by his nickname "The Willow Bunch Giant" was a Canadian circus and freak show giant, professional wrestler, strongman, and star of Barnum and Bailey's circus. He was one of the tallest men in recorded history, with a reported height of 2.52 m (8 ft 3 in).

== Early life ==
Édouard Beaupré was born on January 9, 1881, in Willow Bunch, in what is now Saskatchewan. He was the eldest of 20 children born to Gaspard Beaupré and Florestine Piché, who was Métis.

Beaupré spent his childhood in the ranching community of Willow Bunch. His father worked as a freighter for cattle and horse rancher Jean-Louis Légaré, who was also Beaupré's godfather. As a boy, Beaupré accompanied his father on freighting trips to Moose Jaw, Regina, and Montana.

When Beaupré began school at the age of seven, he was of average height. By the age of nine, he had grown to 1.83 m (6 ft 0 in). Over the next three years, he grew at least another 15 cm (6 in), reaching more than 1.98 m (6 ft 6 in) by the age of 12. His rapid growth made attending school increasingly difficult, and he left his studies around that time.

Growing up in the multilingual communities of southern Saskatchewan, Beaupré became fluent in French, English, Métchif, Cree and Sioux. Despite his exceptional height, he became an accomplished horseman and hoped to make his living as a rancher. Over the next five years, he grew by approximately another 23 cm (9 in), reaching 2.21 m (7 ft 3 in) by the age of 17. His extraordinary stature made ranch work impractical, and he abandoned the occupation.

== Career ==
Abandoning life on the ranch, Beaupré began touring. He displayed his strength by bending iron bars and lifting horses onto his shoulders. He toured from Winnipeg to Montreal and stayed for a time in California. While in Montreal, on March 25, 1901, Beaupré wrestled Louis Cyr, a famous French Canadian strongman. The match was very short, with Cyr winning. Around 21-years-old, he stood 2.41 m (7 ft 11 in) and weighed 166 kilograms (366 lb). His neck measured 21 inches in circumference and his hands were 12 and a half inches from the wrist to finger tips. His chest measured 56 inches while his shoes had to be custom made for his size 22 feet. In December 1903, he measured 2.50 m (8 ft 2 1/2 in).

== Death and aftermath ==
Beaupré signed a contract with Barnum and Bailey on July 1, 1904, to appear at the St. Louis World's Fair in St. Louis, Missouri. Just two days later, on July 3, he died at the age of 23 from a pulmonary hemorrhage caused by complications of tuberculosis. His death certificate recorded his height as 2.52 m (8 ft 3 in) and his weight as 170 kilograms (370 lb).

At the circus's request, Beaupré's body was embalmed following his death. When the circus refused to pay the undertaker's bill, it remained in St. Louis, where it was exhibited publicly. It was later transferred to Montreal, Quebec, and displayed at the Museum of Eden until authorities closed the exhibition because of the large crowds it attracted. The body was then acquired by another Montreal circus, but after the company went bankrupt it was abandoned in a warehouse.

Three years after Beaupré's death, in 1907, two boys discovered the body while playing in the warehouse. The Université de Montréal subsequently took possession of the remains, conducted an autopsy and preserved the body by mummification. Beaupré's remains were then displayed in a glass case at the university for decades as an anatomical specimen.

The Beaupré family did not learn that his body was in Montreal until 1967, 63 years after his death. In 1975, they began seeking its return to Willow Bunch for burial, but the university refused, arguing that the remains retained scientific value and should remain in its care. Fourteen years later, in 1989, the family renewed its campaign with the support of the media. The university ultimately agreed to release the remains on the condition that they first be cremated to prevent grave robbing.

The cremated remains filled two urns and were returned to Willow Bunch in 1990, 86 years after Beaupré's death. Following a memorial service, Beaupré's ashes were interred in front of the Willow Bunch Museum.

== Legacy ==
He is the subject of Beaupré the Giant (Géant Beaupré), a 2024 animated short film by Alain Fournier.
