= David Jalbert =

David Jalbert may refer to:

- David Jalbert (folk musician), Canadian folk musician and singer-songwriter
- David Jalbert (pianist), Canadian concert pianist and professor
