= Hart-Rouge =

Canadian folk music group

- Origin: Canada
- Genres: Folk, pop
- Years active: 1986–present
- Members: Paul Campagne; Michelle Campagne; Suzanne Campagne
- Past members: Annette Campagne; Carmen Campagne

Hart-Rouge are a Canadian folk music group, consisting of siblings Paul Campagne, Michelle Campagne, and Suzanne Campagne.

Originally from Willow Bunch, Saskatchewan, the Campagne family are among the most notable Fransaskois personalities in Canada. Hart-Rouge was the original name of their hometown. The three previously recorded and performed with several other family members as Folle Avoine, the French name for the common wild oat, and formed Hart-Rouge with another sibling, Annette Campagne, when that band ended. During their music career, they were based at first in Winnipeg, Manitoba, and later in Montreal, Quebec.

The band performs traditional folk songs and original material in both English and French. They have also recorded some material in Canadian First Nations languages.

Annette left the band in the mid-1990s, with the band continuing as a trio with collaborating session musicians.

== Connections ==
Their sister Carmen Campagne, who had been a member of Folle Avoine, also continued a career in music, performing independently as a children's entertainer. Their father, Émile Campagne, has also released two albums of traditional folk songs.

Paul Campagne is married to folk singer-songwriter Connie Kaldor. Their son Aleksi Campagne is also a singer-songwriter, who won the Canadian Folk Music Award for French Songwriter of the Year in 2024 for For the Giving / Sans rien donner, an album of songs he wrote in collaboration with Michelle Campagne.

== Discography ==
Albums

- Hart-Rouge (1988)
- Inconditionnel (1990)
- Le dernier mois de l'année (1992)
- Blue Blue Windows (1993)
- La fabrique (1994)
- Bonsoir Québec (1995)
- Beaupré's Home (1997)
- Nouvelle-France (1998)
- Une histoire de famille (1998)
- J'ai fait un rêve (2001)

Contributing artist

- Keith Hunter and the Witness for Christ Gospel Choir (1995)
- The Rough Guide to the Music of Canada (2005)
