= Rural Municipality of Willow Bunch No. 42 =

Rural municipality in Saskatchewan, Canada

Willow Bunch No. 42
- Rural municipality
- Rural Municipality of Willow Bunch No. 42

- Location of the RM of Willow Bunch No. 42 in Saskatchewan
- Coordinates: 49.358°N 105.763°W
- Country: Canada
- Province: Saskatchewan
- Census division: 3
- SARM division: 2
- Federal riding: Cypress Hills—Grasslands
- Provincial riding: Wood River
- Formed: November 21, 1912

Government
  - Reeve: Denis Bellefleur
  - Governing body: RM of Willow Bunch No. 42 Council
  - Administrator: Sharleine Eger
  - Office location: Willow Bunch

Area (2016)
  - Land: 1,047.77 km^{2} (404.55 sq mi)

Population (2016)
  - Total: 306
  - Density: 0.3/km^{2} (0.78/sq mi)
- Time zone: CST
  - Summer (DST): CST
- Postal code: S0H 4K0
- Area codes: 306 and 639
- Website: Official website

The Rural Municipality of Willow Bunch No. 42 (2016 population: 306) is a rural municipality (RM) in the Canadian province of Saskatchewan within Census Division No. 3 and SARM Division No. 2. It is located in the south central portion of the province.

== History ==
The RM of Willow Bunch No. 42 incorporated as a rural municipality on November 21, 1912.

Heritage properties

There is one historical building located within the RM.

- Grand Valley Lutheran Church - Constructed in 1916, in Grand Valley

== Geography ==
=== Communities and localities ===
The following urban municipalities are surrounded by the RM.

Towns

- Willow Bunch

The following unincorporated communities are within the RM.

Organized hamlets

- Scout Lake

Localities

- Grand Valley
- Gye
- Lisieux
- Little Woody
- St. Victor, dissolved as a village February 26, 2003
- Twin Valley

== Jean Louis Legare Regional Park ==
Jean Louis Legare Regional Park (49.3741°N 105.6573°W) is a regional park in the RM of Willow Bunch, 1.6 kilometres (1 mi) south-west of Willow Bunch in the Big Muddy Valley. Established in 1961, the park was named after Jean-Louis Légaré, who was one of the original settlers of Willow Bunch. The park has a campground, golf course, a picnic area, and hiking trails. The trails go through the coulees and valleys of the Big Muddy Valley. Access to the park is from Highway 36.

The campground has 45 campsites (41 of which have electric hookups), washrooms, showers, and a sani-dump. The Willow Bunch Golf Course is a par 36, 9-hole, grass greens course with 3,176 total yards. There is a licensed clubhouse with cart and club rentals.

== Demographics ==
Population history (1981–2016)
Year	Pop.	±%
1981	629	—
1986	605	−3.8%
1991	535	−11.6%
1996	514	−3.9%
2001	439	−14.6%
2006	407	−7.3%
2011	361	−11.3%
2016	306	−15.2%
Source: Statistics Canada via Saskatchewan Bureau of Statistics

In the 2021 Census of Population conducted by Statistics Canada, the RM of Willow Bunch No. 42 had a population of 285 living in 139 of its 163 total private dwellings, a change of −6.9% from its 2016 population of 306. With a land area of 1,037.04 km^{2} (400.40 sq mi), it had a population density of 0.3/km^{2} (0.7/sq mi) in 2021.

In the 2016 Census of Population, the RM of Willow Bunch No. 42 recorded a population of 306 living in 154 of its 175 total private dwellings, a −15.2% change from its 2011 population of 361. With a land area of 1,047.77 km^{2} (404.55 sq mi), it had a population density of 0.3/km^{2} (0.8/sq mi) in 2016.

== Government ==
The RM of Willow Bunch No. 42 is governed by an elected municipal council and an appointed administrator that meets on the second Monday of every month. The reeve of the RM is Denis Bellefleur while its administrator is Sharleine Eger. The RM's office is located in Willow Bunch.

== Transportation ==
The RM is a part owner of the Fife Lake Railway. The Willow Bunch Airport was an airport located within the municipality. The airport closed in 2009.

== See also ==
- List of rural municipalities in Saskatchewan
