= Les Hay Babies =

Indie folk trio from New Brunswick, Canada

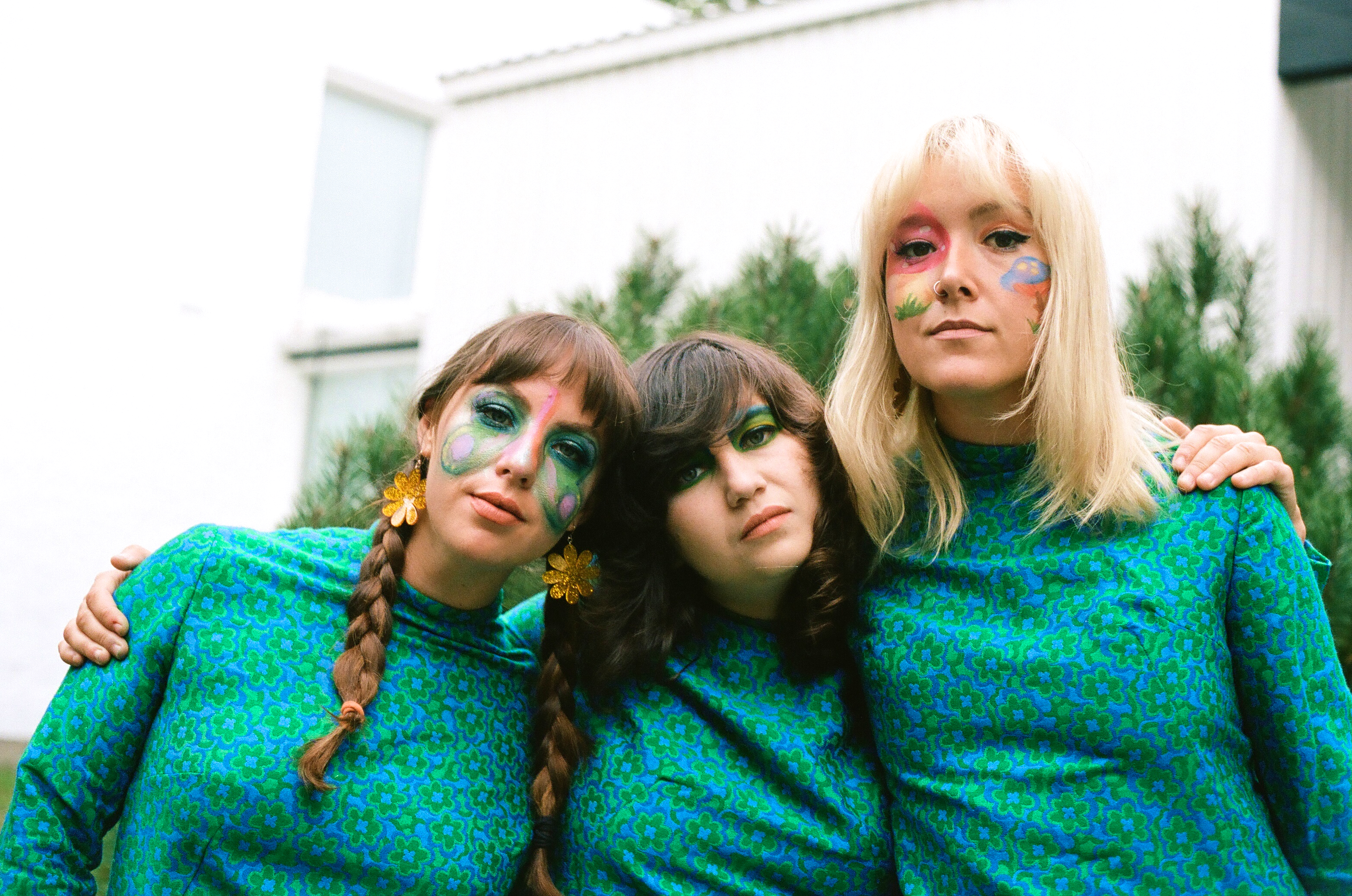
- Julie Aubé, Vivianne Roy and Katrine Noël, in 2019

Background information
- Origin: Moncton, New Brunswick, Canada
- Genres: Indie folk
- Years active: 2011–present
- Label: Simone Records
- Members: Julie Aubé; Katrine Noël, Vivianne Roy
- Website: leshaybabies.com

Les Hay Babies is an indie folk trio from New Brunswick, Canada. Its members—Julie Aubé (banjo), (guitar), Katrine Noël (ukulele), (bass) and Vivianne Roy (guitar)—each grew up in a small Acadian village. The group has seen success in Canada and in Europe. Their accolades include a Canadian Folk Music Award and four East Coast Music Awards.

== Background ==
The members first met while performing as solo artists at "Accros de la chanson", a music competition sponsored by the province of New Brunswick. In 2009 and 2010, each member was a prize winner.

The trio met again at another music contest, "le Gala de la chanson de Caraquet", and in November 2011, Les Hay Babies formed.

At the East Coast Music Awards in Moncton in 2012, Les Hay Babies surprised guests by performing in elevators.

Les Hay Babies began performing in The Maritimes and Québec. After performing at the Festival Interceltique de Lorient in France, they were described as "an instant hit in Europe", which led to three continental tours where they performed in Switzerland, Germany, France and Belgium.

In May 2013, Les Hay Babies won the Francouvertes. In 2014 they performed in the Francophone Festival at Harbourfront in Toronto.

== Discography ==
=== Studio albums ===
Title	Details	Peak
Title	Details	CAN
Mon Homesick Heart	Released: April 15, 2014; Label: Simone Records; Formats: LP, CD, digital download, streaming	13
La 4ième dimension (version longue)	Released: October 14, 2016; Label: Simone Records; Formats: LP, CD, digital download, streaming	-
Boîte aux lettres	Released: February 28, 2020; Label: Simone Records; Formats: LP, CD, digital download, streaming	-

=== Extended plays ===
Title	Details
Folio	Released: July 31, 2012; Label: Simone Records; Formats: digital download, streaming

=== Singles ===
Title	Year	Album
"Tumbleweed"	2012	Folio
"La bear song"	2012	Folio
"Quand t'as venu au monde"	2012	Non-album single
"Fil de téléphone"	2014	Mon Homesick Heart
"Néguac and Back"	2014	Mon Homesick Heart
"Motel 1755"	2016	La 4ième dimension (version longue)
"Laisse-le pas te laisser"	2017	La 4ième dimension (version longue)
"Half du temps"	2018	La 4ième dimension (version longue)
"Joue Avec Le Feu (Version française de "Play With Fire")"	2019	Non-album single
"Same Old, Same Old"	2020	Boîte aux lettres
"En Californie"	2020	Boîte aux lettres
"Mam pis pap"	2020	Non-album single
"Jacqueline"	2021	Boîte aux lettres
"Almost minuit"	2021	Boîte aux lettres
"Entre le chein et le loup"	2024	
"Soyez fiers"	2024	

== Awards and nominations ==
Year	Association	Category	Work	Result	Ref.
2013	Francouvertes		Themselves	Won	
2014	East Coast Music Awards	Francophone Recording	Le Folio	Won	
2014	East Coast Music Awards	Group Recording	Le Folio	Nominated	
2014	Félix Award	Révélation de l'année	Themselves	Nominated	
2014	Félix Award	Record Producer	François Lafontaine (Mon Homesick Heart)	Nominated	
2014	Félix Award	Folk Album	Mon Homesick Heart	Nominated	
2014	Canadian Folk Music Awards	French Songwriter	Mon Homesick Heart	Won	
2015	East Coast Music Awards	Folk Recording	Mon Homesick Heart	Nominated	
2015	East Coast Music Awards	Francophone Recording	Mon Homesick Heart	Won	
2015	SOCAN Songwriting Prize	Francophone	"Néguac and Back" (Note: Julie and Katrine specifically nominated)	Nominated	
2017	Canadian Folk Music Awards	French Songwriter	La 4ième dimension (version longue)	Nominated	
2017	Félix Awards	Alternative Album	La 4ième dimension (version longue)	Nominated	
2020	Félix Awards	Interpretive Album	Viens avec moi (Live) (Note: Les Hôtesses d'Hilaire featuring Les Hay Babies, Mathieu Pelgag, Jonathan Bigras, Anna Frances Meyer, Diane Losier, Robin-Joël Cool & Lucien Francoeur)	Nominated	
2020	Félix Awards	Folk Album	Boîte aux lettres	Nominated	
2020	Félix Awards	Critics Choice Album	Boîte aux lettres	Nominated	
2021	East Coast Music Awards	Group Recording	Boîte aux lettres	Won	
2021	East Coast Music Awards	Francophone Recording	Boîte aux lettres	Won	
