= Willow Bunch, Saskatchewan =

Town in Saskatchewan, Canada

Willow Bunch Hart-Rouge and Talle-de-Saules
- Town
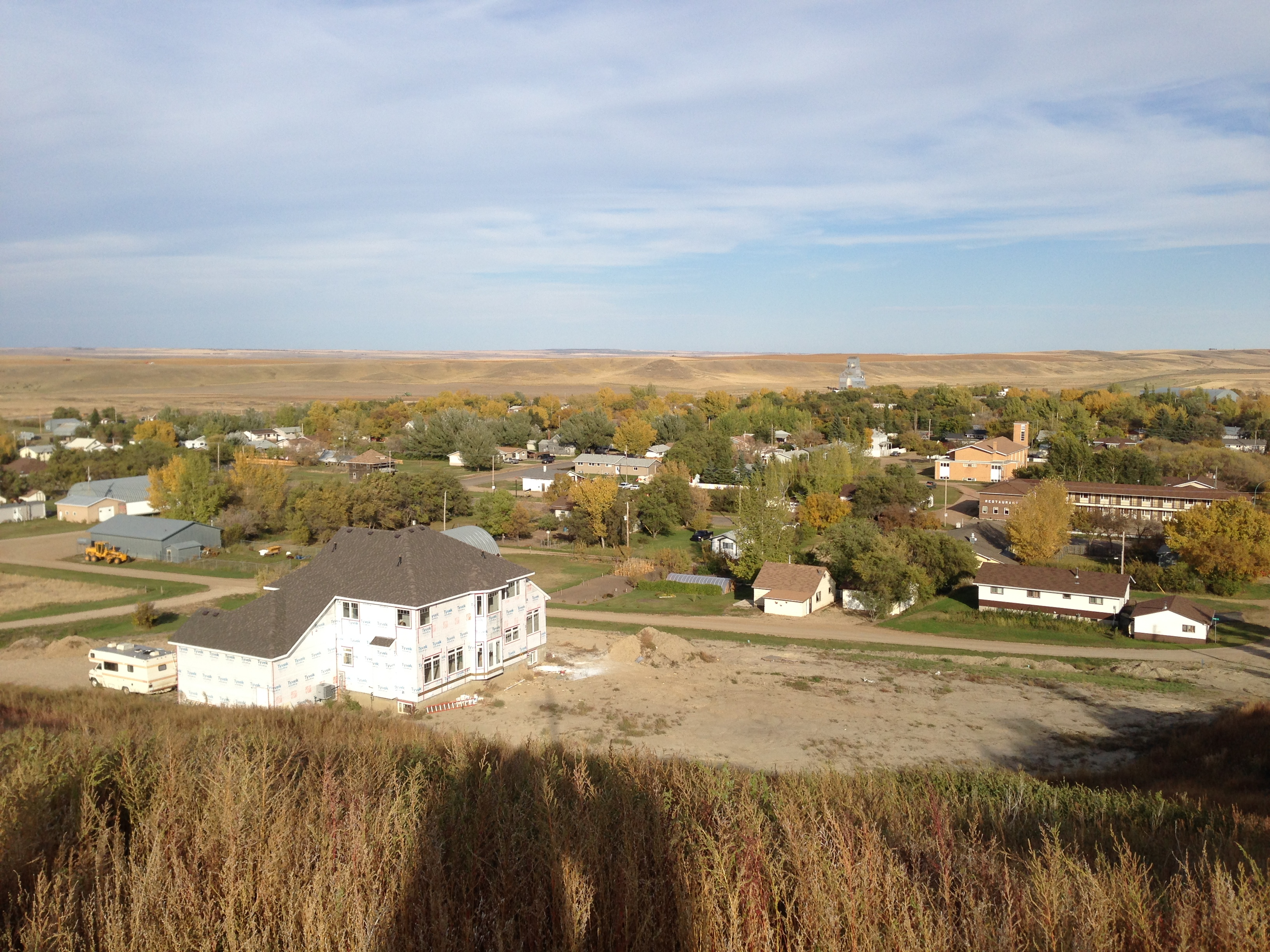
- Willow Bunch
- Nickname: Home of the Giant
- Location within Saskatchewan
- Coordinates: 49.3910056°N 105.6330528°W
- Country: Canada
- Province: Saskatchewan
- Rural Municipality: Willow Bunch
- Post office Founded: April 1, 1895
- Incorporated (Village): Nov. 15, 1929
- Incorporated (Town): Oct. 1, 1960

Government
  - Mayor: Marissa Baril
  - Town Administrator: Sharleine Eger
  - Governing body: Town Council
  - MLA Weyburn-Big Muddy: Dustin Duncan (SKP)
  - MP Cypress Hills—Grasslands: Jeremy Patzer (CON)

Area
  - Total: 0.84 km^{2} (0.32 sq mi)

Population (2021)
  - Total: 299
  - Density: 360/km^{2} (920/sq mi)
- Time zone: CST
- Postal code: S0H 4K0
- Area code: 306
- GNBC Code: HANJB
- Website: www.willowbunch.ca

Willow Bunch is a town in the Canadian province of Saskatchewan. It is located 190 kilometres (120 mi) southwest of the provincial capital of Regina. Its population was 299 at the 2021 census. Previous names for Willow Bunch include Hart-Rouge and Talle-de-Saules. The area has seen influences from Métis and Fransaskois.

== History ==
=== The Métis of Willow Bunch ===
Around 1824, the Métis began to move towards Southern Saskatchewan: "As they ventured farther out, they began to set up winter camps and stay year-round. One of the first settlements was at Wood Mountain, which was settled in about 1868-69. But in 1879, fires forced the Métis to move to the eastern slope of the hills to a place known as 'Talle de Saule'." The Métis settlement in Willow Bunch is one of the first in Saskatchewan. They initially arrived in groups consisting of large extended families; no one journeyed individually. As a result of travelling between communities regularly, the Métis began to intermingle, creating relationships with the different groups of settlers. This gave rise to the growth of the settlement in Willow Bunch. The majority of the Métis settlers that came to Willow Bunch were partially of First Nations and of French or Scottish descent.

At the end of the 1860s, many Métis settlers moved towards Wood Mountain, Saskatchewan, from the Red River Colony, Pembina, North Dakota, and other communities in the North West. They came in search of bison. Soon after the arrival of the Métis, Jean-Louis Legaré set up a trading post in Willow Bunch, aiding the Métis as a trader of bison goods. Nearing the mid-1880s, there was a decline of bison in the Wood Mountain region, as a result of the United States government's attempt to starve out Sitting Bull. With the end of the Bison Hunt, the Métis began life as ranchers: "We brought our stock and expertise to Willow Bunch. No one knew more about horsemanship and training horses than we did". The Métis population in Willow Bunch became known as a "hub of the first tentative ranching operations in southwestern Saskatchewan." The Métis originally referred to the town and its surrounding area as "Talle de Saule" which means "Clump of Willow." This nickname soon gave rise to the town's name of Willow Bunch.

The red willows found around Willow Bunch were an important factor in the everyday lives of the Métis. The multifaceted willow played a large role in their wellbeing:

In spring, our women harvested the supple, young shoots to make baskets. Our men fashioned the wood into pipe stems, emergency snowshoes, snares, wooden nails, whistles for the children, beading looms, and frames for stretching hides. Rotted willow wood was used to smoke hides. Green willow branches were burned to smoke meat. We twisted the inner bark fibers into temporary rope, twine and fish nets. We weather proofed rawhide by wrapping it in willow bark. We used willow branches as lathing for our houses. Our men scraped off the inner cambium layer and added other ingredients, such as bearberry, to make a smoking mixture, 'Kinnikinick'. We repaired our carts, made a shelter when we were caught in a storm, burned for fuel and had a variety of other practical uses for the wood of the willow.

The Métis found use for the willows in a variety of ways, including as a medicinal ingredient. Thus, places where the willows grew were considered a healing place. This is why "the people would settle near clumps of willow and name their community accordingly."

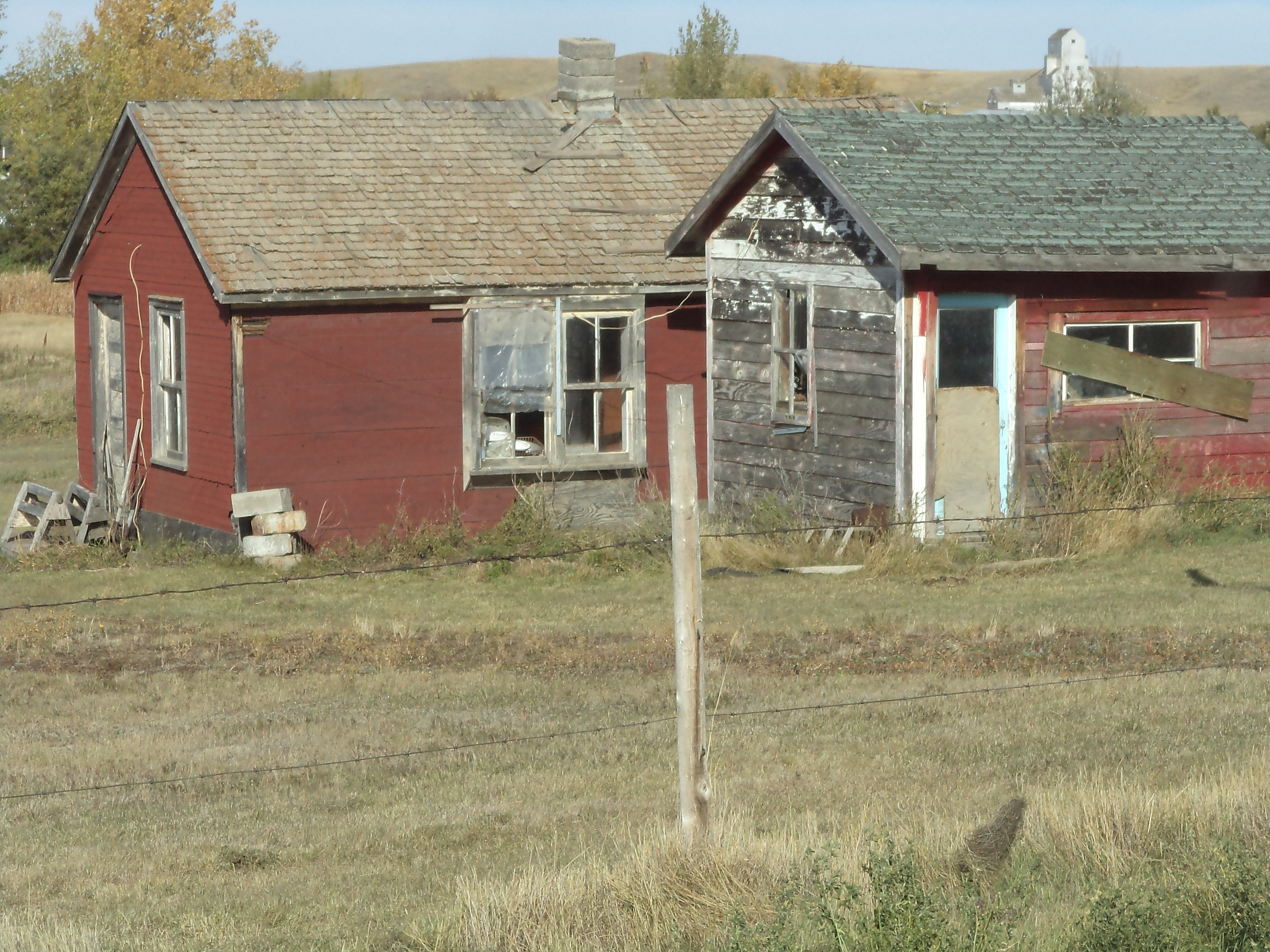
Métis Hamlet in Willow Bunch, 2013

=== The Métis today ===
The town of Willow Bunch is occupied with Francophone and Métis people.

Willow Bunch is the Rural Municipality #42 in southern Saskatchewan. In 2006, the total Aboriginal population for the RM #42 was 407. The Métis in Willow Bunch "played a key role in maintaining the peace during the time that the Sioux and the other American tribes were forced from the United States into the area of Wood Mountain. " The Métis had a strong relationship with the Sioux, especially with Chief Sitting Bull. "The fires of 1880 on Wood Mountain resulted in the movement of our people to other communities. It was at this time that the Métis pioneers moved to Willow Bunch at the suggestion of Andre Gaudry." The Métis were already settled in Willow Bunch when the North West Resistance, led by Louis Riel, battled the Canadian government over land rights. It was in 1885, "the Resistance had an impact on the Métis of Willow Bunch...marked the end of the influence of the Métis on the development of Western Canada. "

Following the 1885 Resistance, many changes occurred for the Métis nation of Willow Bunch. "[They] were told that the land property that [they] settled on didn't belong to [them]. It became an issue ... as new immigrants arrived [they] found their identity and culture continually being eroded." The Métis of Willow Bunch still feel the indifference within this small town due to lack of the historical Métis knowledge to the newcomers. "That feeling of inferiority that many of [them] were taught to feel ... That practice of one group being denigrated at the expense of another is still evident today. " The Métis of Willow Bunch will hopefully coexist with the non-Métis community without the idea of superiority over another. Alike to most First Nations situations, the Métis will continue to fight for their rights not only in Willow Bunch but across this nation.

==== The Willow Bunch Métis Local #17 ====
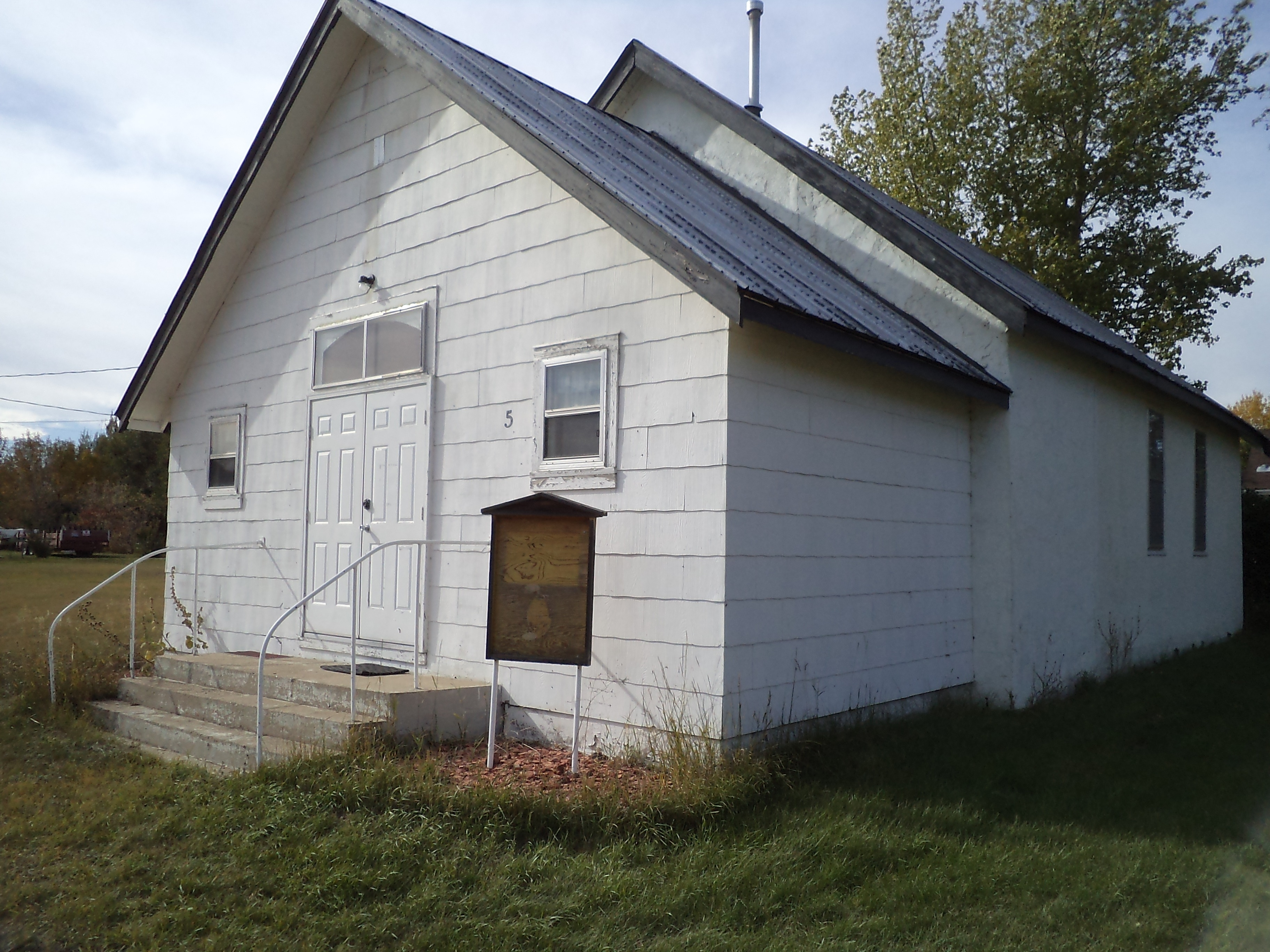
Willow Bunch

The Métis Local #17 in Willow Bunch is one of the first Locals established within the Métis Nation of Saskatchewan.

=== Historical background to 1880 ===
For Saskatchewan, Willow Bunch has the title as one of the oldest settlements established. Founded in 1870 by variety of groups of Métis hunters and settlers, Willow Bunch has strong historical connections with Red River Métis. Later on, Jean-Louis Légaré would migrate from Manitoba to Willow bunch, where he played a lead role in early Willow Bunch history.

In the mid-1800s, those who were living in Manitoba's Red River area were succumbing to the harsh climate and living conditions. Bison were becoming scarce due to over hunting in their area. Work was more difficult to find since the merging of the Hudson's Bay Company and the Northwest Company in 1821. Along with pests, frosts and droughts which led to lower crop harvests, over-population of the Metis people were a part of the uneasy living conditions. This led to the Métis migrating somewhere else to settle.

The Métis had to stay close to the bison, which meant they were to move west of Red River. Places like Saint Joseph's in North Dakota became established winter places that the Métis would go to. Later, declining buffalo herds led to the Métis migrating farther and farther away. In the 1860s, living conditions, including crop conditions, were so severe that the Hudson's Bay Company had to step in to help avoid starvation.

Later, the Red River Métis moved towards what is now southern Saskatchewan after the Red River Uprising in 1869. This led to the first Metis settlement established, called La Coulee Chapelle, which is St. Victor today (located about 19 km west of Willow Bunch). Before this uprising, areas like Wood Mountain, Eastend, and Cypress Hills were places that Métis would migrate to.

It is said that Andre Gaudry was one of the first settlers in the area. Willow Bunch was part of a district known as Montagne de Bois, or Wood Mountain.

=== 1880–1910 ===
==== Bonneauville ====
After a devastating prairie fire destroyed much of the grass and timber in the area around Wood Mountain, Saskatchewan, many First Nations and Métis people were driven by a bison shortage and an increasing population to seek out new settlements. Many settled along the Milk River, south of the 49th parallel, and the Frenchman River, one of its tributaries in Saskatchewan. A number of them settled in the area known by the Métis as Talle de Saules (clump of willows) and Hart Rouge, now known as Willow Bunch.

In 1881, Jean-Louis Légaré, a French-Canadian trader and one of the founding members of the Willow Bunch community, settled in what is part of the present-day Jean Louis Légaré Regional Park. Légaré, who married into the Métis community, opened a trading post/store there, and often traded various necessities to the local Métis for bison goods. In the spring of 1881, it was estimated he had around $3,000 worth of bison products in his store.

A boy named Édouard Beaupré, better known as the Willow Bunch Giant, was the first child born and baptized in the area in 1881.

The forerunner settlement of Willow Bunch was established in 1883, around two miles east of Légaré's store and one-and-a-half miles east of the present town. A small village grew around a spot where Reverend Pierre St. Germain, the head of the local parish at the time, chose to build a Catholic church. The chapel and residence were completed in 1884, and the settlement became known as Bonneauville with the arrival of Pascal Bonneau Sr. and his family in 1886.

The North-West Mounted Police (NWMP) soon built a barracks in Bonneauville in 1886 as part of "B" Division, with 12 men and 13 horses, following the Riel Rebellion in Batoche in 1885. By fall of that year, however, only two constables were left.

==== Ranching: early years ====
Ranching soon became one of the mainstays of the local economy. Légaré brought in 45 head of cattle from Manitoba in 1884, and petitioned Government of Canada to do a land survey in 1886. Eight townships were surveyed, including Bonneauville. By 1893, the NWMP reported there were 300 people in the Willow Bunch area.

Sheep were introduced to the area in 1894, of which the Métis tended small herds. Growth, however, was slow for ranchers. Limited markets and a lack of transportation infrastructure in southwestern Saskatchewan forced ranchers to start out small. Bonneau Sr. and his three sons began ranching in 1886 with only four horses and four cattle, but by 1900, Bonneau Sr. had a herd of 400 head of cattle and 400 head of horses. After opening a cheese factory in 1888, Jean-Louis Légaré maintained the largest ranching operation in the area for a time. The ranching operation of Bonneau, Sr.'s son, Pascal Bonneau Jr., became even bigger. By 1900 Bonneau Jr. had a herd of 5,000 to 6,000 head.

Weather and prairie fires took their toll on ranchers in the area. A combination of drought and harsh winter weather between 1886 and 1887 devastated herds in southwestern Saskatchewan. Légaré himself lost 350 head of cattle in 1893-1894, forcing the closure of the cheese factory. Prairie fires in 1885 were also responsible for the destruction of the willows that the town and area were named for.

Ranchers gave little thought about where their cattle roamed, and often did not grow hay for the winter. Légaré was among those who rejected the use of hay. In 1903–04, a severe winter, recounted by Reverend Claude J. Passaplan as the worst in recorded history at the time, followed prairie fires and an early frost, leaving cattle with nothing to eat. The Métis around Willow Bunch lost all of their cattle as a result. An even worse winter in 1906–07 caused a loss of an estimated 60 to 70 per cent of all cattle in southwestern Saskatchewan.

==== Beginnings of Willow Bunch ====
Slowly, farming began to overtake ranching, and thoughts of moving the settlement into a more suitable site for growing the community began in 1898. The Catholic Bishop of the area made a request for 160 acres of land, but received only 80 from Jean-Louis Légaré, which became the present site of Willow Bunch. Several delays from a number of changes to the headship of the local parish delayed action until 1905, the year of Saskatchewan's confederation, when Reverend Alphonse Lemieux was assigned to the parish. He arrived in Bonneauville to find the church in a dilapidated state. That year, a new rectory was built at the present site of Willow Bunch, followed by a new church in 1906.

The town that would become Willow Bunch started to grow. A hospital was built in 1909, headed by Dr. Arsene Godin, called the Red Cross Hospital. The first official act of the Rural Municipality of Willow Bunch #42 was a meeting, chaired by Pascal Bonneau Jr., on January 4, 1910.

=== 1911–1930 ===
At the end of 1927, according to the Willow Bunch "Parish Bulletin", there were "77 baptisms, 11 marriages and six burials for a population of 1,348 distributed over 227 families of which 219 are French-speaking." During this time several buildings that were constructed, the residents celebrated their 50-year golden jubilee and there was an active political culture. But by the end of 1929, over 200 people had left Willow Bunch due to the intense drought and the effects of the Great Depression.

==== Notable buildings ====
The Convent of the Sisters of the Cross was built in April–May 1914 using a $3,000 grant from the Roman Catholic Archdiocese of Regina. The stones and sand for the foundation and all building materials were hauled for free by parishioners of the Willow Bunch Catholic Church. Construction was halted after World War I broke out because of a lack of funding and the loss of many skilled workers who joined the army. Construction resumed and was completed in 1921.

In 1920 the Statue of Sacred Heart of Jesus was erected using donations of $4,000 from the community. The statue was then consecrated on July 13, 1922 at the golden jubilee. In November 1922, T.W. Sr. and Kate Bennett's house served as the United Church of Willow Bunch until December 1926 when the United Church was opened and dedicated to the service and worship of God. Although the budget for the project was set at $1500 the town operated well below as the lot was bought for $175 and the carpenters were contracted for $850.

In 1924, The Canadian Red Cross installed a nursing outpost at the Willow Bunch hospital, also known as the "Pasteur Hospital." The hospital was expanded to more than twice its length in 1925. On September 14, 1927, the Sisters of Charity of St. Louis took over general operations but the Sisters left in 1929 due to the Depression.

The first home built with running water and flush toilets was completed in 1917. In 1922, the Willow Bunch Rural Telephone Company was founded and a building was erected. That year, there were 12 subscribers. In 1926, a railroad line was constructed through Willow Bunch, enabling passenger train service.

==== Golden jubilee ====
On July 12 and 13, 1922, Willow Bunch celebrated its 50th anniversary in a golden jubilee celebration. On the first day, a Mass was attended by 800 people.

==== Political culture ====
William W. Davidson was elected as the Conservative Party Member of the Legislative Assembly (MLA) in the provincial Willow Bunch electoral district in 1912. Abel James Hindle was elected the Liberal Party MLA from 1917 to 1925 at which time he stepped down and passed the nomination to James Albert Cross. Cross was MLA until 1929 when another Liberal, Charles William Johnson was elected. At the Federal level, the Federal riding of Willow Bunch was established in 1924, and Thomas Donnelly was elected and remained in power until the riding was abolished in 1933.

On November 8, 1922, Donnelly attempted to introduce a motion that "the federal government of the Dominion of Canada should no longer assist immigrants to this country in any financial way except so far as financial assistance is at present being extended to female domestics."

When the Willow Bunch Municipal Council heard Austria-Hungary, Germany and Turkey wanted to negotiate for peace with the Allies at the close of World War I, they offered this reply:

This municipality is overjoyed at even the prospect of a possibly peace, but not the peace evolved by terms. One does not make peace with a mad dog or a venomous reptile. There can be but one condition and one only under which hostilities will cease- imperialism strangled beyond resuscitation and militarism banished for ever. Peace on these conditions may be possible but on no other. According to the Willow Bunch Legion, there were seven recorded Willow Bunch casualties during World War I.

=== 1931-1945 ===
==== The drought and aftermath ====
Throughout the 1930s, Willow Bunch and the rest of southern Saskatchewan was hit with numerous dust storms. The dust storms were the outcome of a devastating drought, and the agricultural damage ended up costing the Saskatchewan provincial government more than $20 million. The drought also spawned a swarm of grasshoppers.

In 1937, the Sitkala school, which had only two classrooms, was destroyed by fire.

==== Southern Saskatchewan Coal Operators' Association ====
Despite the poor agriculture, the production of coal was on the rise. On Sept. 19, 1932, Willow Bunch hosted the first annual meeting of the Southern Saskatchewan Coal Operators' Association at the R.M.'s municipal hall. At the meeting, association president Robert Campkin discussed how the unity of local mines would help increase the retrieval of lignite coal. The price of lignite was set at $2 per ton in the 1930s.

==== Wheat resurgence ====
Once the weather stabilized, the price of wheat spiked from six bushels per acre in 1938 to 16 bushels per acre in 1939. Willow Bunch welcomed the first load of wheat to the town's south country grain elevator on Aug. 5, 1939. The wheat came from a local farm, which was renowned as the "Million Dollar Farm" because of its exceptional wheat quality.

==== Establishing the credit union ====
Willow Bunch established a credit union in 1942, creating a membership-owned alternative to private banks.

==== Newspapers ====
The Willow Bunch Beacon, a local newspaper, was published in 1943. It focused on postwar conflicts, the decline in wheat prices, the domestic coal situation in Saskatchewan, and Canada's need for more poultry, meat, and eggs. An annual subscription cost $1.50.

The Avonlea Beacon was published from 1944 until 1951.

=== 1943 to 1960 ===
Beginning in 1943, Saskatchewan Power began supplying electricity to the village from a coal burning plant in Estevan.

The Overseers of the village included: George Martin (1945), Wilfrid Benoit (1955), and Marcel Ingrand (1959.

In 1949, the Convent and the public school consolidated and a new school was built. The Brothers of the Christian Schools joined the teaching staff in 1950; they remained until 1963.

By the mid-1950s, the population was approaching 800.

In 1960 Willow Bunch was incorporated as a town.

The European Hotel, built in 1907, was damaged by fire in 1959.

Quarters were made available by the town of Willow Bunch for an RCMP detachment at a location was vacated in 1947. In 1951, the detachment moved to a new location, and continued to be used until 1966.

In 1957, the Hoath United Church closed and move the small congregation to the Willow Bunch church.

=== 1970–1980 ===
==== Willow Bunch Museum ====
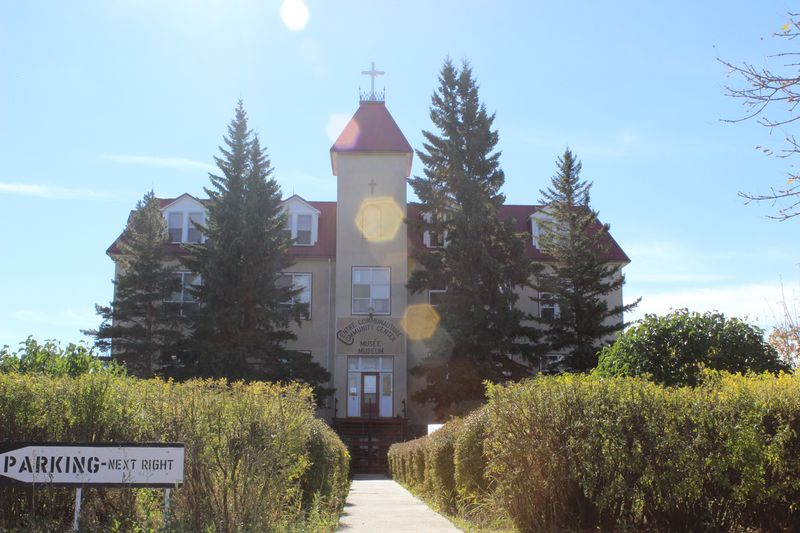
Willow Bunch Museum

In 1972, the Willow Bunch Museum and Heritage Society was established, and located in the former Union Hospital (operated from 1946 to 1969). The museum moved to the Sisters of the Cross Convent School in 1984.

==== Palace Theatre ====
The Knights of Columbus constructed a building in 1925, which was used for public meetings in 1928. It became a theatre in 1931, and was the town's community social centre, showing movies, and also being used for Knights of Columbus meetings and bowling in the basement. It closed in 1969. In 1973, the building became town property. (Willow Bunch Museum Picture Reference)

==== RCMP leave Willow Bunch ====
In 1976, the two-man Royal Canadian Mounted Police detachment in Willow Bunch moved to the nearby town of Coronach, Saskatchewan. Residents of Willow Bunch protested at the Regina Legislature on two occasions to prevent the move.

=== 1990 - present ===
==== Grain elevators ====
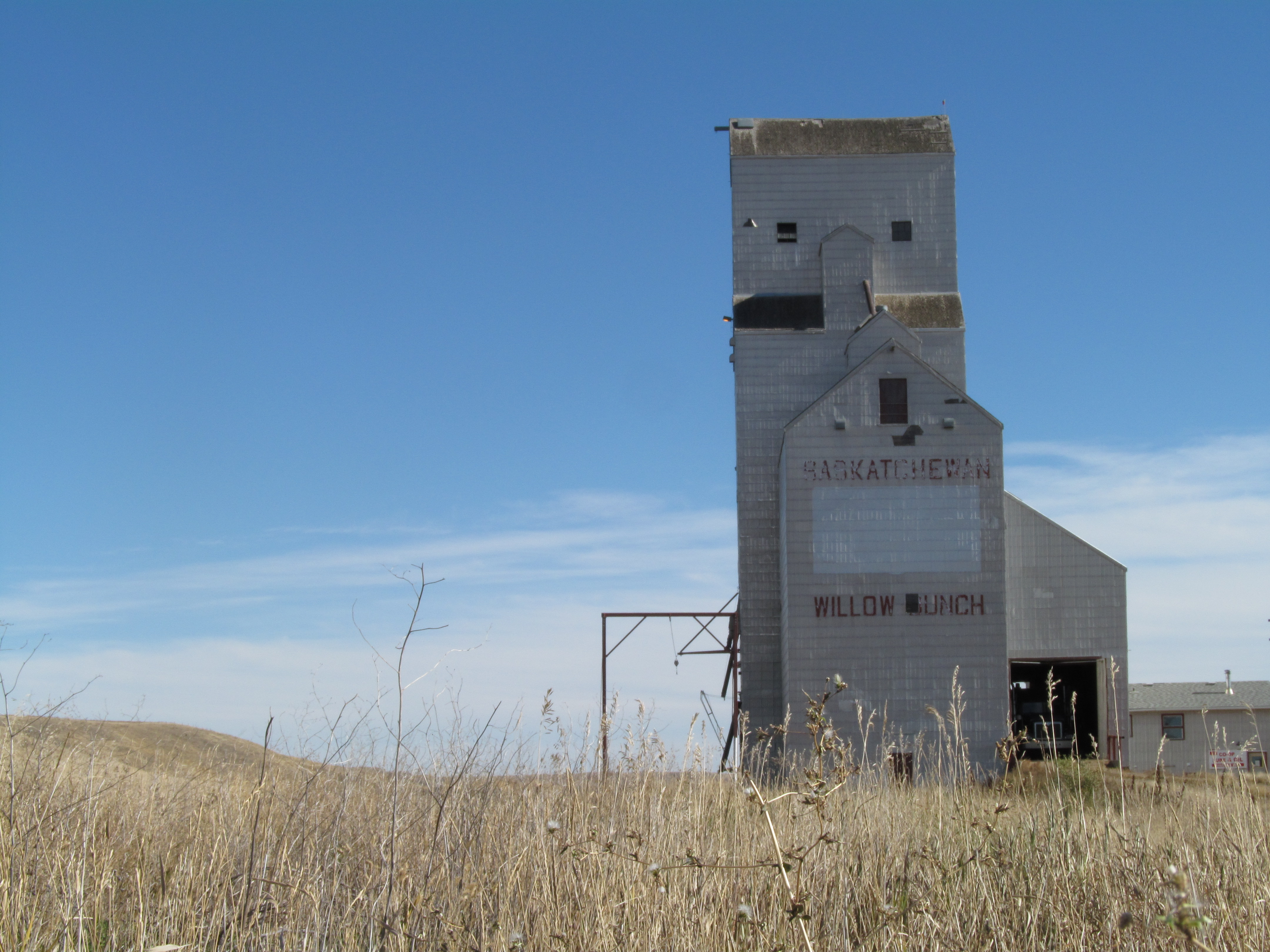
The old Saskatchewan Wheat Pool C elevator in Willow Bunch. It is now privately owned.

For many years there were four grain elevators in Willow Bunch. Saskatchewan Wheat Pool No. 88 A, United Grain Growers (UGG) No. 1 and the McLaughlin Elevator all opened in 1926. McCabe Brothers began operations in 1929. The capacity of each elevator varied between 30,000 and 32,000 bushels. By the early 1980s the elevators began to shut down, following a trend which was seen right across the province and the prairies. The Pool A, McLaughlin (which by then was Pool B) and McCabe Brothers (now UGG No. 2) elevators all closed in 1984. UGG No. 1 would follow in 1999. The final elevator to close was Sask. Pool C, which opened in 1982 with a capacity of 3,670 metric tonnes, ceased operations in 2001. It is now privately owned.

==== Willow Bunch School ====
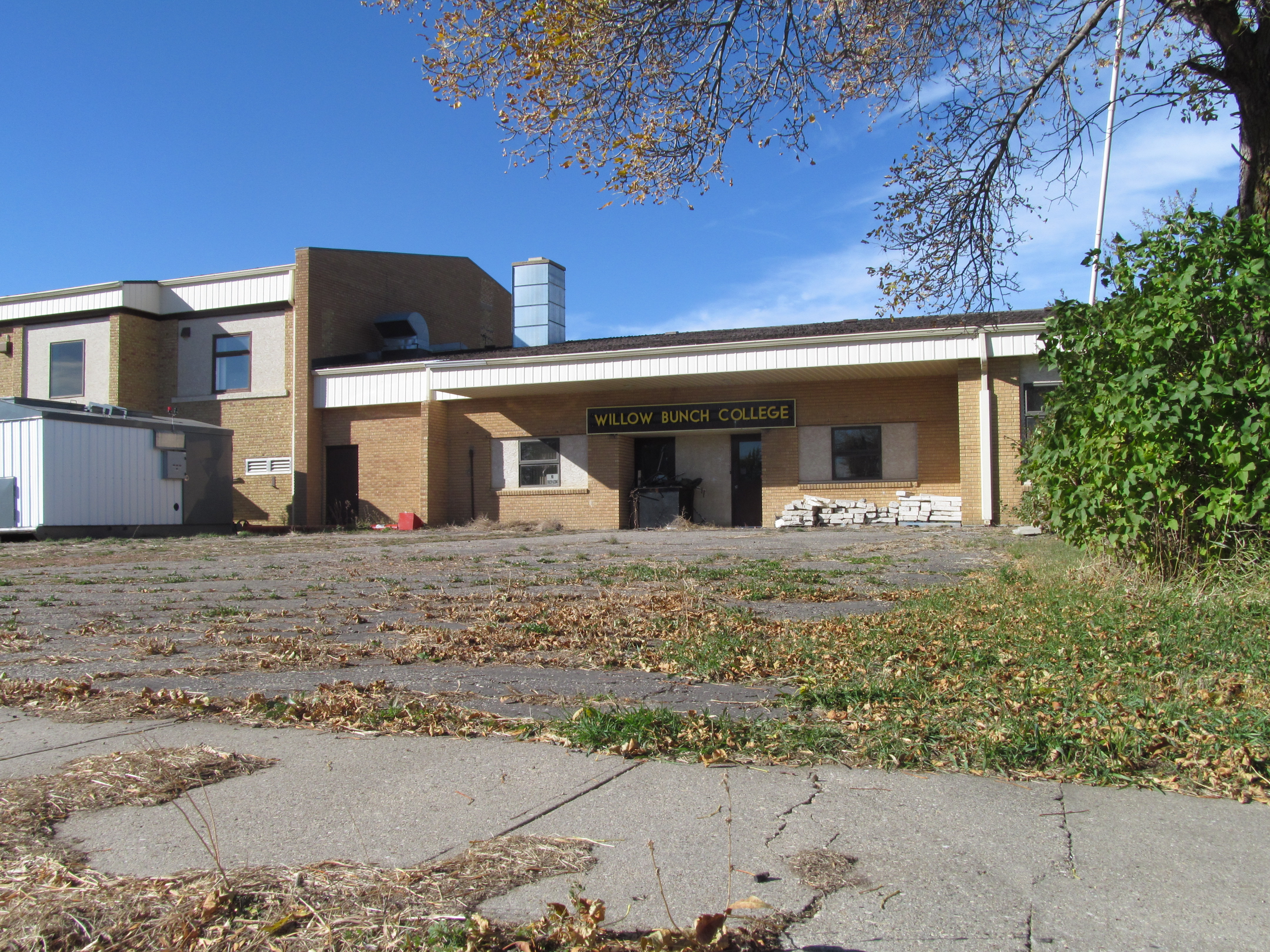
The former Willow Bunch School.

Enrolment at Willow Bunch School had been declining since the mid-1960s, when approximately 425 students were enrolled. In 2006, the school's population was approximately 50 students. In 2007, the Prairie South School Division began a review of its schools in seven communities, including Willow Bunch. The division maintained it was becoming a challenge to "deliver an effective learning program in a fiscally responsible manner." In 2007, the Prairie South School Division voted to close five schools by the end of August, including the school in Willow Bunch.

==== Library ====
In 2009 the library moved to a new home. Established in 1973, the Willow Bunch Library is a branch of the Palliser Regional Library. Originally located in the Hills of Home Senior Centre, the entire collection was moved to the former RM office, which was vacated in 2008 as the Town of Willow Bunch and RM offices were amalgamated. The move took place on April 20, 2009, with the grand opening a month and a half later on June 12.

== Political history ==
Municipal organization began in Willow Bunch in the year 1910, when the community was formed as District #42. A meeting which was held at Philip Légaré's house, chaired by Pascal Bonneau Jr. on January 4, marked the first official act. Pascal Bonneau Jr., Dr. Arsene Godin, Alphonse Dauphinais, Amedee Beaubien, W. Ineson, James Hazlett, and A. Saunier were the first members, elected in 1910.

Amedee Beaubien replaced Pascal Bonneau Jr. as president after Bonneau died. E.P. de Laforest was elected secretary-treasurer for the year 1910 and was replaced by Alex P. Beausoleil in 1911.

The results of the elections in December 1911 were Treffle Bonneau as Reeve/Mayor, and O.A. Hainstock, B. Lowman, Alphonse Dauphinais, Peter Kabrud, Joseph Lapointe, and Alfred Lalonde were elected as councillors.

In 1912, Treffle Bonneau served as the first reeve of Willow Bunch Rural Municipality (RM) #42. This meant that he was also the mayor for the town at this time. In 1913, a committee which Treffle Bonneau served on sought provincial intervention in relation to rural municipal taxation on grazing lands.

In 1927, the first RM-owned office was built and Leopold Sylvestre, the secretary-treasurer, occupied the office from 1927 to 1958. He served 31 years, making him the longest serving secretary-treasurer of any RM in the province.

In 1961, Rachel Skinner was elected to her second term as councillor. Mrs. George Drouin also served her second term that year, and the two women were said to give stronger representation on a six-man council than any other town in the province.

In 1912, there was a redistribution of federal electoral districts, including the RM of Willow Bunch. At the time, it was decided that the redistribution was fair and provided for the just representation of the people.

However, the federal electoral district riding of Willow Bunch that was created in 1924 was abolished in 1933 when the riding was redistributed into Moose Jaw, Swift Current and Wood Mountain. Liberal Candidate Dr. Thomas Donnelly was elected to the new riding in 1925. He also won in the 1926 and 1930 elections.

During the 1928 Liberal Party nomination, Donnelly was the unanimous choice of the Liberals of the Willow Bunch provincial constituency. The other nominees were T.E. Gamble, an MLA from Ogema, J.B Swift, from Assiniboia, Thomas Gallant from Gravelbourg, and A.J. Hindle, ex-M.L.A for Willow Bunch. The Conservative candidate, nominated in 1928, was J. Gibbins, a farmer from the Assiniboia district.

A political issue of the day had to do with whether to give immigrants financial assistance. In 1928, there was a resolution that no further financial assistance would be given by the federal government. Notice of a motion on the topic was given by Dr. Donnelly in Willow Bunch in 1928. In 1929, a vote recount had to take place in Willow Bunch following the application of the unsuccessful candidate, C.W Johnson.

== Notable people ==
- Édouard Beaupré, one of the tallest men in recorded history.
- Carmen Campagne, children's entertainer.
- Hart-Rouge, folk music group

== Women's organizations ==
Through various groups and organizations that the women of Willow Bunch belong to, they often spend their time volunteering and raising money for charities and community causes. The Legion Ladies Auxiliary #287 was formed June 8, 1974 in Willow Bunch. Its curling team won first in the Legion auxiliary zone district curling bonspiel in 1982. The Catholic Women's League started on October 29, 1963 in Willow Bunch. The League says it is, "dedicated to serving the needs of the community and increasing the spiritual growth of its members as they work and share together". Its members raise money doing raffles, teas, bake sales, etc. and then donate to various organizations and charities. The Federation des Femmes Canadiennes Françaises was originally formed in 1914 in Canada to help soldiers of World War I. It came to Willow Bunch in 1967. Since the war their goal has been to help French Canadian women reach their full potential and to be proud of their heritage as a member of the minority in the community. They have carried out substantial work for different charities including distributing meals for, "Meals on Wheels". The Happy Hobby Club originated at the house of Elizabeth "Beth" Marie Louise Viala in October 1955. They enjoyed themselves meeting on a weekly basis and often worked on projects, which they sold to raise money for charities (such as quilts). They also put on social events in the Community Centre (formerly the Sharon School building). They had annual picnic for members and their families; one year, 100 people were in attendance. The Kinettes Club of Willow Bunch was formed on January 27, 1978 with Mary Eger as the formation president. Their goal was to help with Kinsmen club projects as well as to start their own projects in order to promote Willow Bunch and stimulate community interest. Their events include Ladies Night Out and the Community Birthday Calendar.

=== The Convent ===
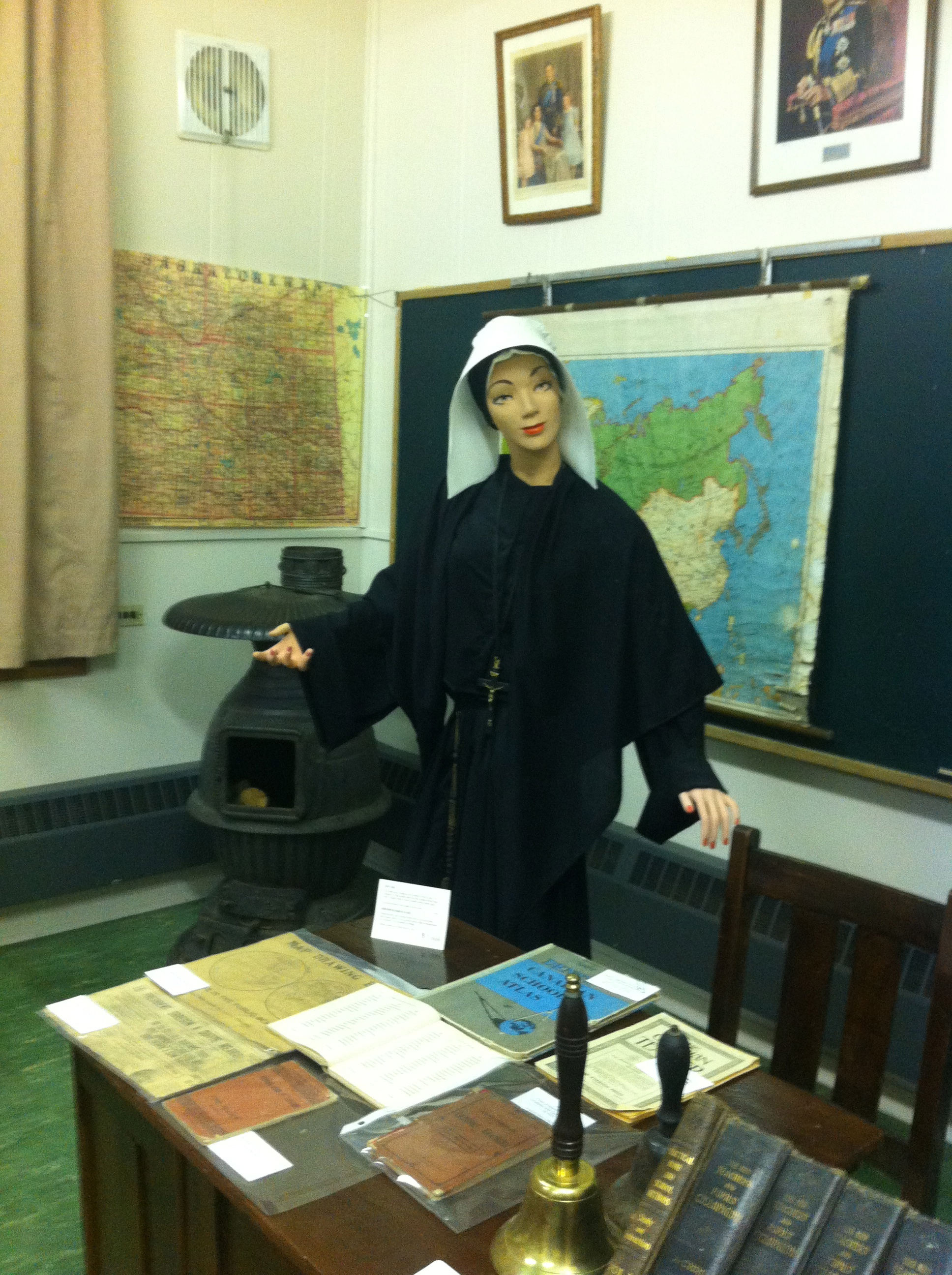
Willow Bunch Museum Mannequin- Sister

The Willow Bunch Convent was operated by the Sisters of the Cross. It was opened in 1914 for students and over 40 boarders who would live there, and the 91 Sisters who served until the closing of the school in 1983.

== Mayors and reeves ==
In 1912, Willow Bunch was recognized as a rural municipality by the Government of Saskatchewan. The first reeves were Treffle Bonneau, O.A. Hainstock, B. Lowman, Alphonse Dauphinais, Peter Kabrud, Joseph Lapointe and Alfred Lalonde.

Willow Bunch officially became a village on November 15, 1929. After this, the village nominated its first "overseer", Emmanuel Lebel.

On October 1, 1960, Willow Bunch was incorporated as a town, with overseer Marcel Ingrand as mayor.

== Geography ==
=== Climate and ecology ===
Willow Bunch sits in a small valley in southern Saskatchewan, about 740 metres above sea level.

Underground aquifers are one of the most important water sources in the area, although many are too deep to drill wells into.

=== Willow Bunch Lake ===
Willow Bunch Lake, located 7 kilometres (4.3 mi) north of the town, is 2,200 feet along the base and 1,875 feet in the north-eastern region of the lake.

=== Vegetation and soil ===
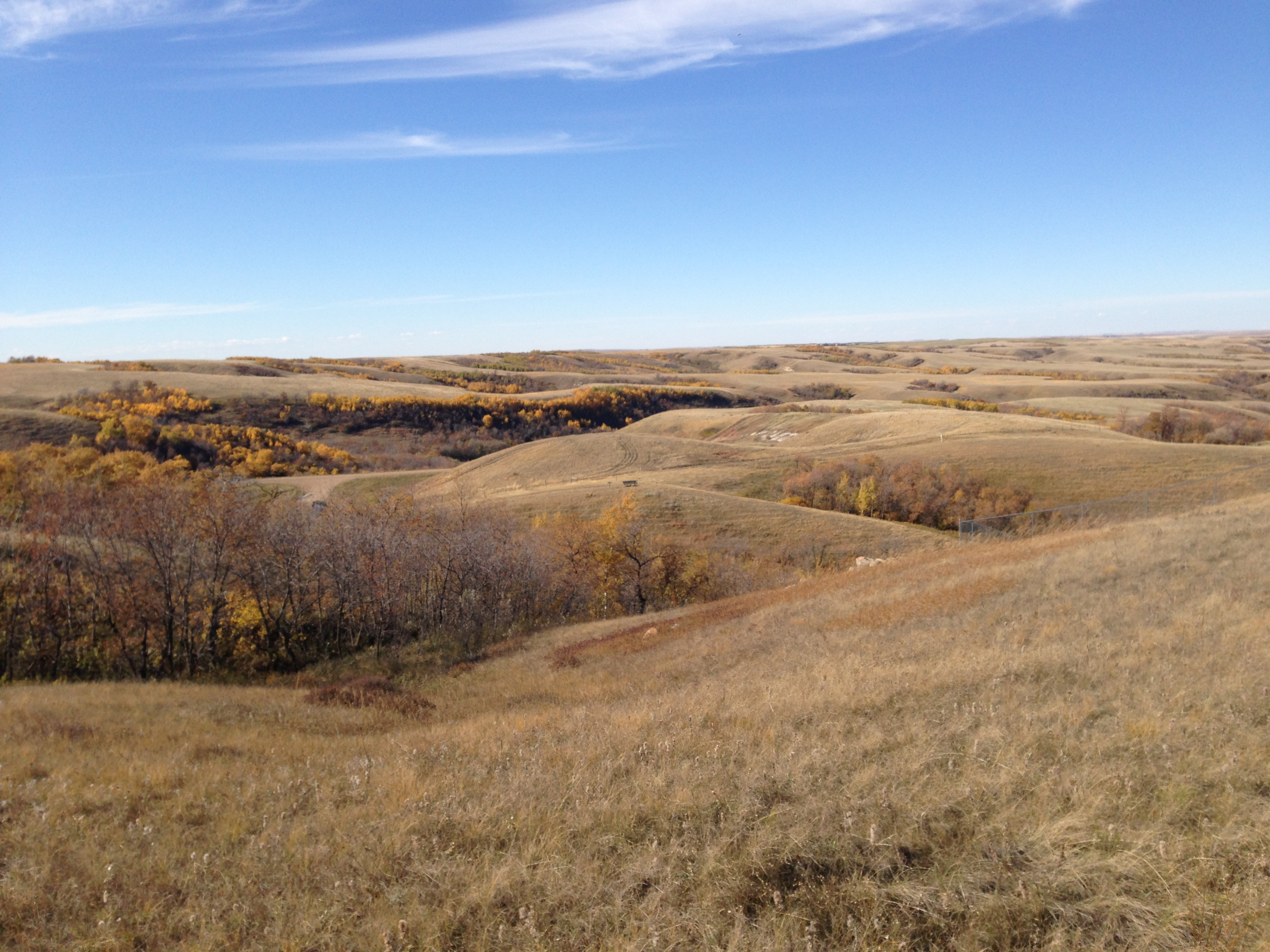
The hills in the areas surrounding Willow Bunch provided for difficult soil to farm on, however it acted as good grazing area for cattle ranchers.

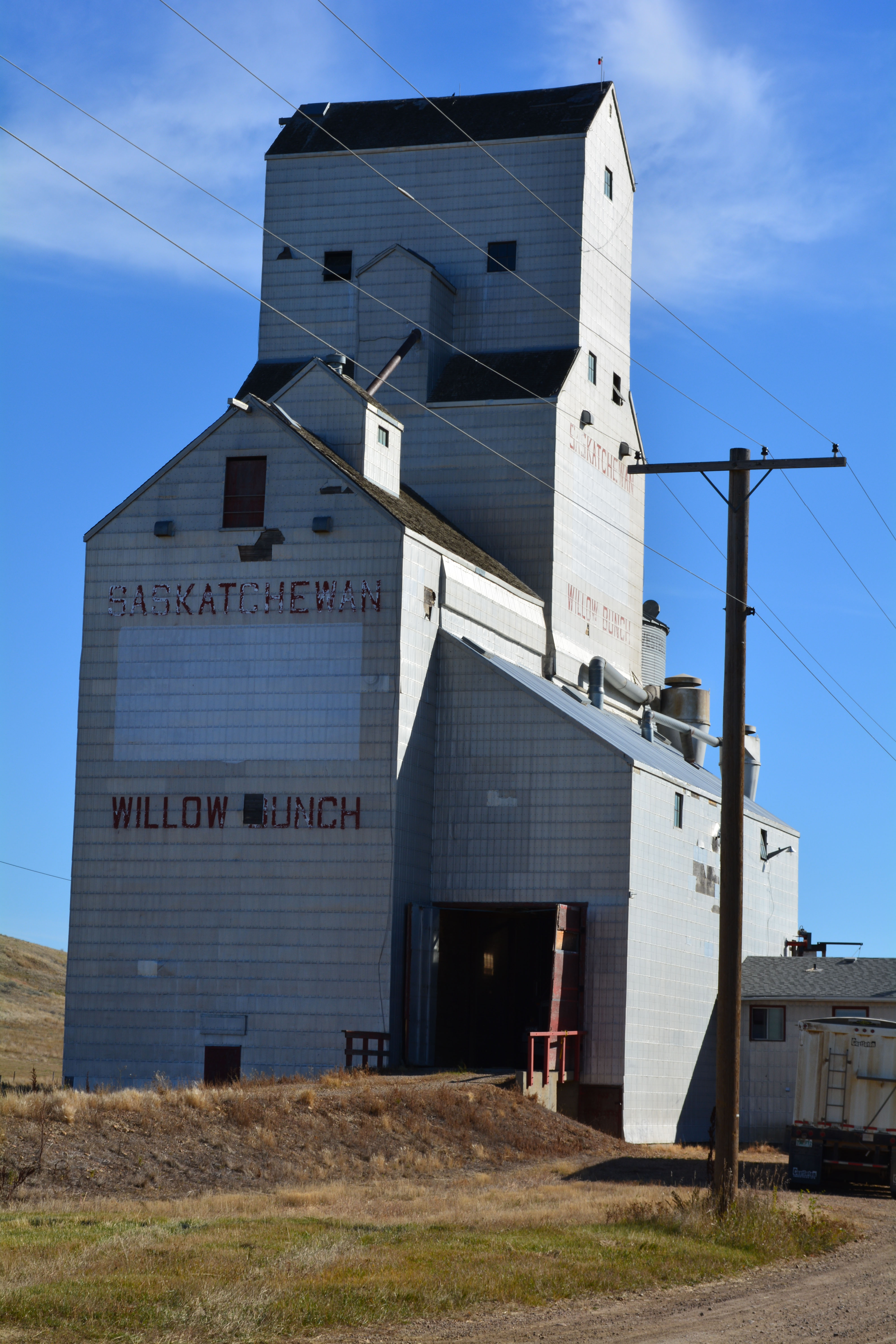
Evan Radford - WB Grain Elevator

Large scale cultivation was impractical for early settlers, as the soil contained saline flats, stony deposits, and slough areas, and the settlement lacked railway access to export markets. Livestock was preferred, particularly by the Métis, enabled by the hills and grassy pastures near Willow Bunch. The area experienced drought in the 1890s, and livestock losses were significant in 1893. By 1884, bison no longer roamed the Willow Bunch area, which affected the settlement's Métis, who were forced to focus more on farming.

=== Industry ===
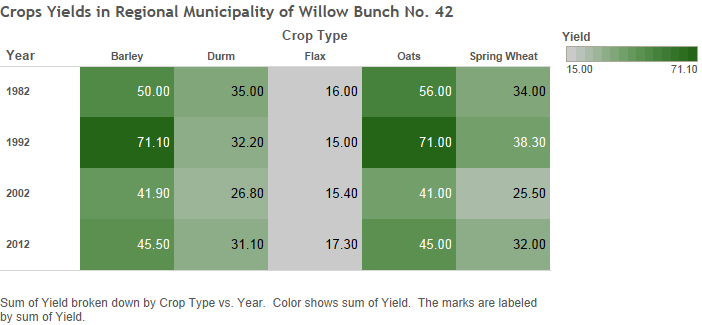
Crops Yields in Rural Municipality of Willow Bunch No. 42

Agriculture has been and continues as Willow Bunch's largest industry, with spring wheat, durum, oats, barley, and flax seeing the most consistent production over the last 30 years, since 1982. Among these top five crops, the most productive year over the past 70 was in 1993 when 71.5 bushels per acre of oats were produced. These numbers are gathered from the rural municipality of Willow Bunch, RM 42, an area spanning 1,047.8 square kilometres. As of the 2011 Canadian census, there were 102 farms in the Willow Bunch area, operated by a total of 125 farmers. The average age of farm operators in the area is 53.4, while the average farmer's age overall in Saskatchewan is 54.2. In the area, there are 16 animal production farms and 86 crop production farms.

Along with a sustainable agricultural industry, Willow Bunch has seen the trademark grain elevators and rail lines that allow the industry to thrive. In 1925, CN expanded its railway into the town, operating up until the mid-2000s. The Saskatchewan Trails Association lists the rail line between Willow Bunch and Bengough as being abandoned around 2005.

For a large portion of the 1900s, four massive grain elevators towered over Willow Bunch. They were owned by United Grain Growers Ltd., Saskatchewan Pool Elevators Ltd., McLaughlin Company Ltd., and McCabe Brothers Grain Co. Ltd. Today, only one elevator remains, built in 1983, originally owned by the Saskatchewan Wheat Pool, and now jointly owned and operated as Prairie Giant Processing Inc. It is used for grain storage and cleaning.

In days past, the mining industry was a particular boon to residents of the town and area. Immigrants who had experience with coal mining in Europe, located lignite coal in the area and developed coal mines, including open pit, shaft, and straight cut. Twenty three different mines were in operation during the early to mid-1900s, all with different owners. Frédérick Desjardins' mine stands out as the longest operating, continuing until the late 1950s. Currently, the nearest coal mine is in Coronach; the Popular River Mine employs 800 people.

=== Services ===
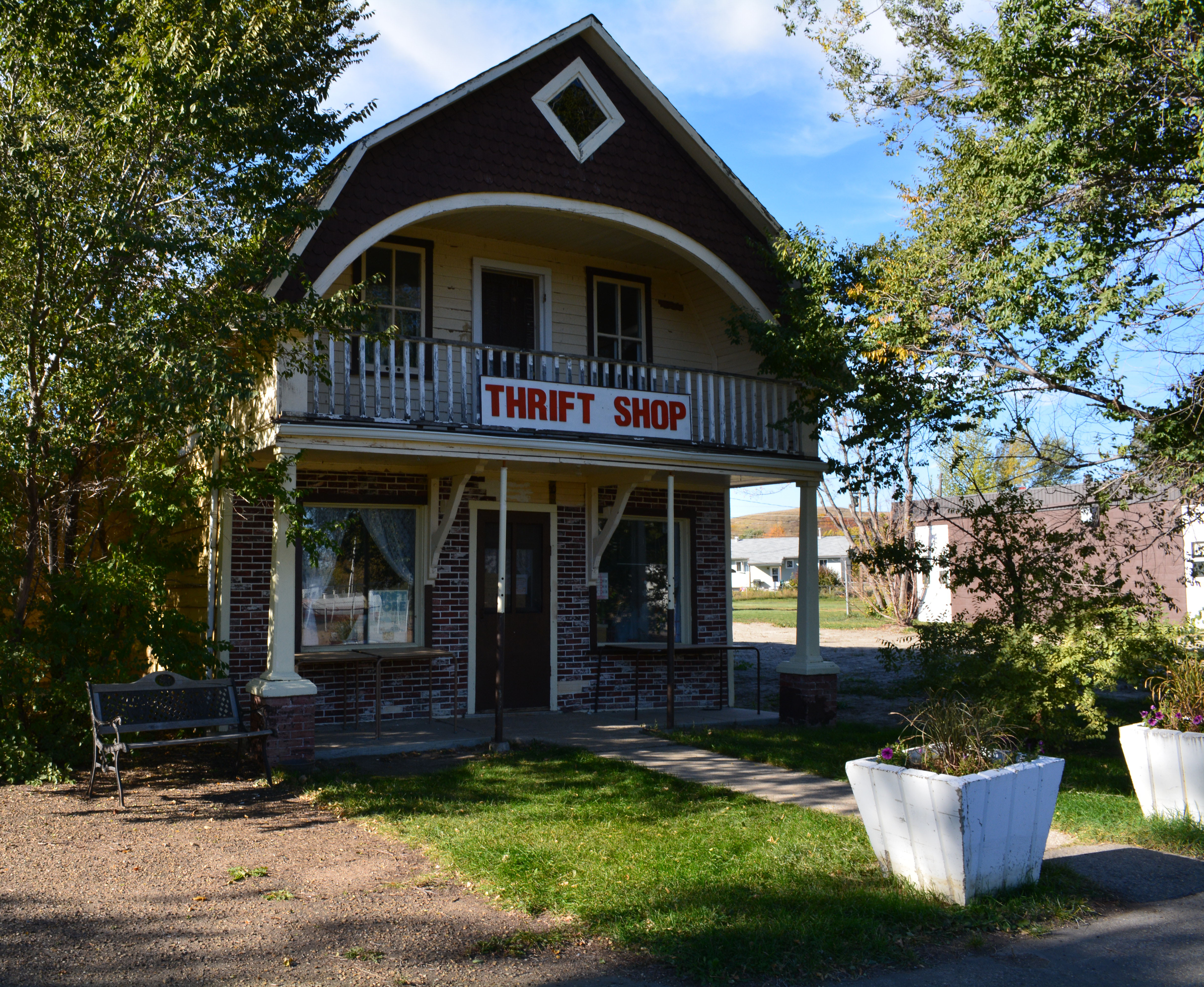
Evan Radford - WB Thrift Shop

Services include a town-owned thrift shop, a volunteer fire department; an auctioneering service; a convenience store and gas bar; a community rink, library, and swimming pool; the Hills of Home Senior Centre Club; a variety store; and the RM office for the region.

=== Transportation ===
There are two highways servicing Willow Bunch. Highway 36 runs on a north–south axis, eventually reaching the United States border at the Coronach Border station, and extending north to Highway 13. Highway 705 intersects Willow Bunch on an east–west axis, spanning 63 kilometres west to Wood Mountain, and extending more than 230 kilometres east, stopping at provincial Highway 47.

=== The "hamlet" ===
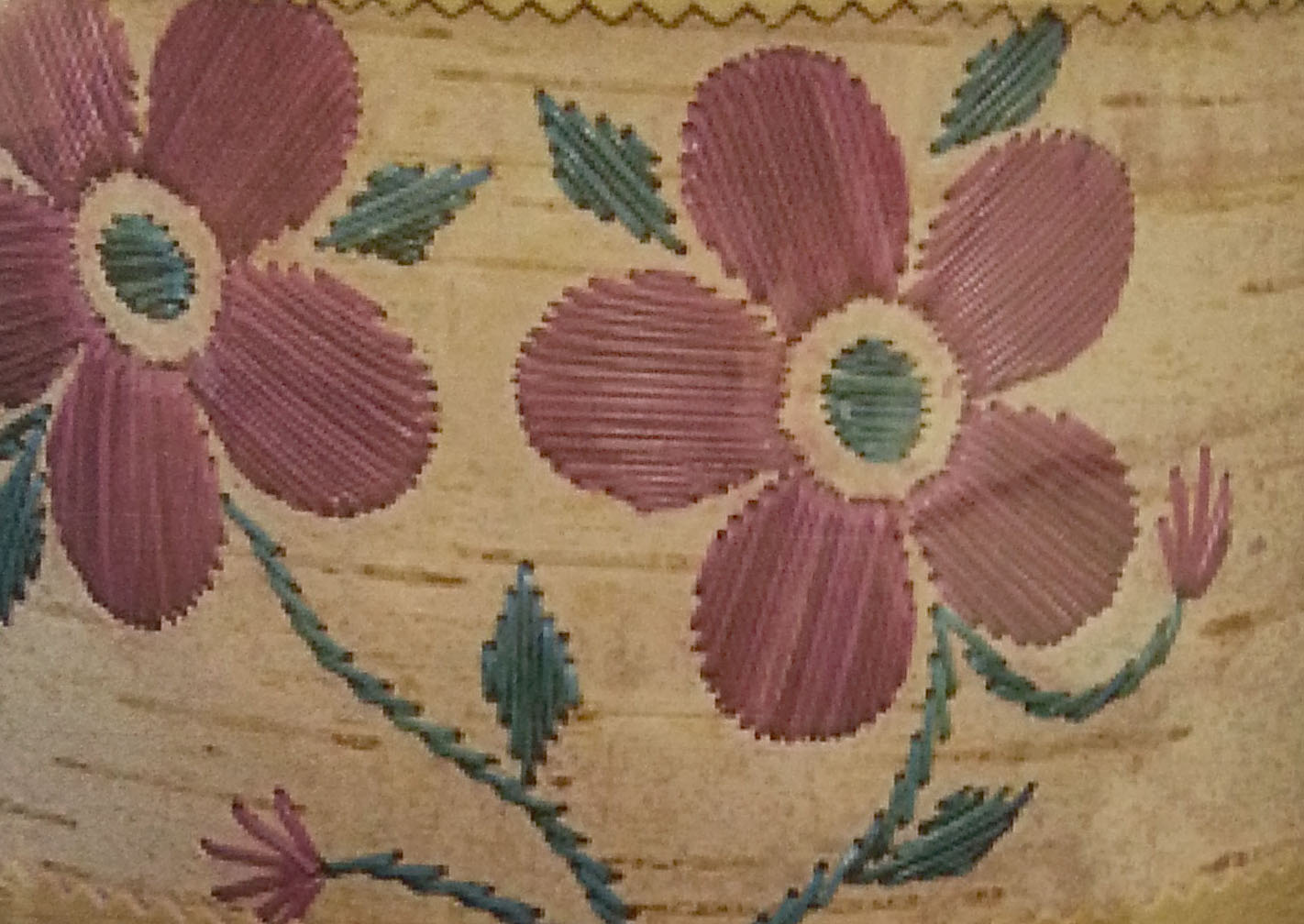
Five-Petal Rose

An area known as "the hamlet" used to divide Willow Bunch's Métis and French settlers. The old, abandoned homes of Metis families can be seen outlining a coulee south of town.

=== Dutch Hollow Art Club ===
The Dutch Hollow Art Club formed in 1954 after the country school of Dutch Hollow closed. Activities include shell craft, sewing, ceramics, and cookbook making.

== Tourism ==
=== Willow Bunch Museum ===
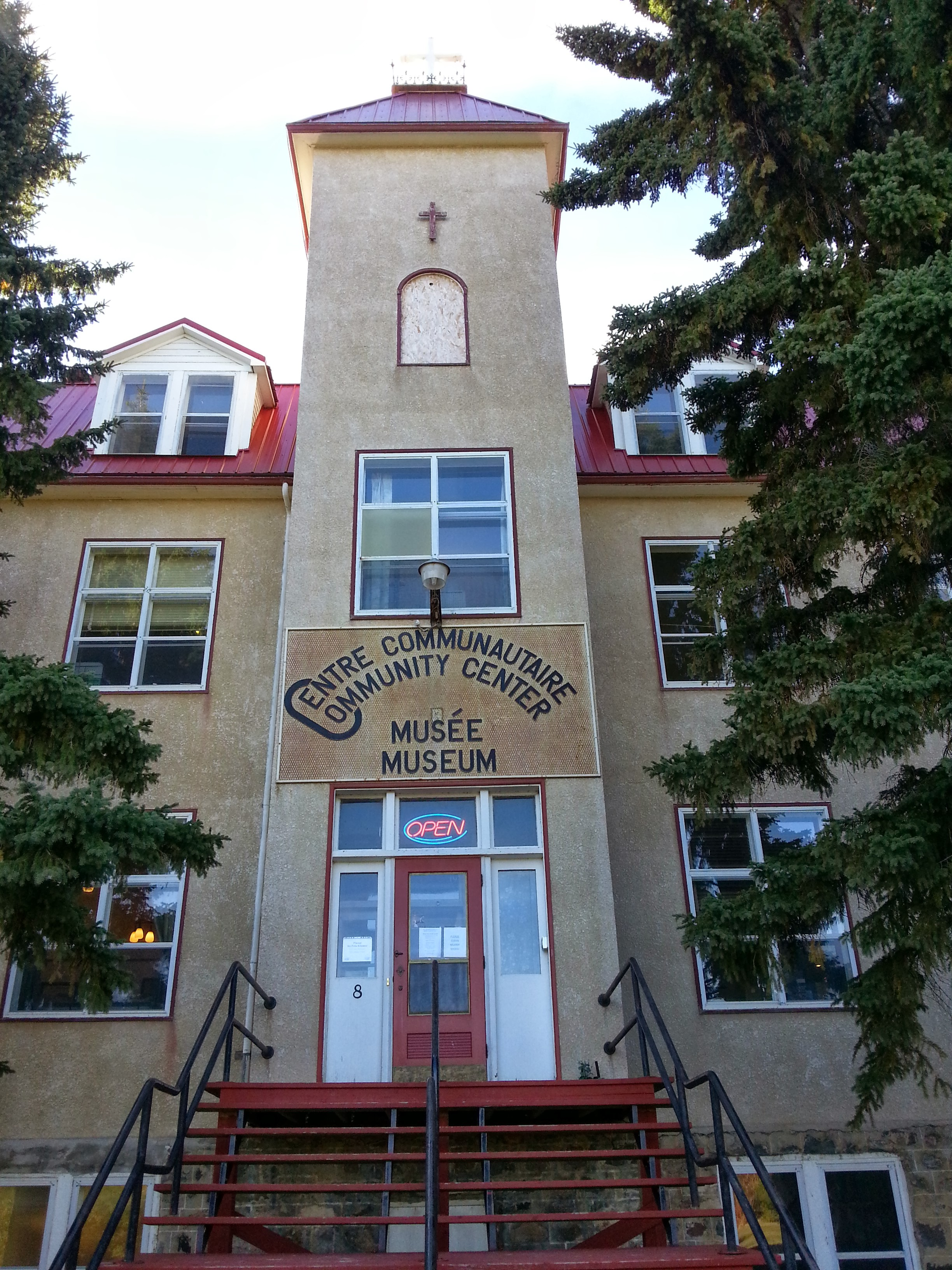
Willow Bunch Museum

The museum supplies the history of its town and surrounding area in a former convent of the Sisters of the Cross. The Museum was established in 1972 by a group of local students through a government summer employment program. It has two full floors of eight exhibits, which are individually dedicated to Édouard Beaupré, pioneers, the chapel, town archives, homemakers, Métis, North-West Mounted Police/tools and technology, and the hospital. Local and former residents donated the artifacts; however, many of them are packed in boxes that are still waiting to be displayed.

== Agriculture ==
The Willow Bunch area relies primarily on agriculture for income. There are currently 102 active farms in the area, producing grains, spring oats, winter oats, lentils, barley, nuts, berries, and livestock.

== Demographics ==
In the 2021 Census of Population conducted by Statistics Canada, Willow Bunch had a population of 299 living in 156 of its 186 total private dwellings, a change of 9.9% from its 2016 population of 272. With a land area of 0.91 km^{2} (0.35 sq mi), it had a population density of 328.6/km^{2} (851.0/sq mi) in 2021.

The average median age of the population in Willow Bunch is 50.2, with 88% of the population over the age of 15 years of age. Within Willow Bunch, males represent 55% of the population, while females account for 45%.

A majority of the population in Willow Bunch are married or living with a common law partner. This group makes up 57% of the population. Single residents account for 19% of the population and separated, divorced and widowed individuals make up 10% of the population.

There are 120 families in Willow Bunch, resulting in a total of 90 children from 0–25 years old. However the average number of children still at home according to the Canadian Census 2011 is 0.8. A majority of families are small families; two-person families represent the largest percentile (58%), while families of five or more make up the smallest section of the population (4%).

A majority of residents in Willow Bunch are of European or Métis Origins. The 2011 census reported 100% of Willow Bunch residents were not of a visible minority. All residents in Willow Bunch are Canadian citizens. A very small portion of the community identify as immigrants (3%), while the remainder are not immigrants (97%).

The 2011 Canadian Household Survey reported Willow Bunch residents are primarily Christian.

- Christianity: 85% (Catholic 51%) (United Church 34%)
- No religious affiliation: 11%
- Other religions: 0%

Most Willow Bunch residents speak English as their mother tongue (84%), a smaller percentile identify French as their first official language (17%). A large percentage of the community is bilingual speaking both French and English (21%).

In terms of occupation, the 2011 Canadian Household Survey reported that residents held the following positions:

- Management occupations: 5%
- Business, finance and administrative occupations: 12%
- Sales and Service occupations:12%
- Trades, transport and equipment operators and related occupations: 12%
- Natural resources, agriculture and related production occupations: 22%
- Occupation not applicable: 36%

The median income in Willow Bunch is $24, 252.

- Men $59,661
- Women $19,084

== Education ==
The French language is a symbol of Willow Bunch, Saskatchewan. It remains a spoken language of the Métis, francophones and various other peoples who live there today. However, French was not always a priority in the town's schools.

Before Willow Bunch became situated in its current location in the early 20th century, it was known as Bonneauville. Bonneauville was the location of the town's first school, which opened in 1886 and had no formal name. It was, however, known as a "Free Catholic School."

At the time, Bonneauville was governed by the North-West Territories, as the province of Saskatchewan had yet to be created. There was no legislative act regulating education in the area. Consequently, the school was dependent on ratepayers for funding. Having this burden enabled the residents of Bonneauville, under the North-West Territories Act of 1875, to choose which language the school would teach their children in. Because records were vague during the school's first two years of operation, it is difficult to ascertain which language they learned in. However, it is likely that they learned in French because the majority of residents were francophones in 1888.

On November 28, 1888, the school was formally established as Sitkala Roman Catholic Public (R.C.P.) # 23 by Proclamation of Lieutenant Governor Joseph Royal. Jean-Louis Legaré, Prudent Lapointe, Narcisse Lacerte and Isidore Ouellette were trustees for Sitkala R.C.P. Lapointe's brother, Joseph Lapointe was the school's only teacher until Antonia Granger was hired in 1889.

Twenty-six students from 20 families attended the school in its first term, which ended on March 31, 1889. They were taught reading, dictation, writing, arithmetic, drill, grammar, and geography, all in French. They also learned English as a second language.

In 1907, Sitkala R.C.P. relocated to what would be known as Willow Bunch. The Sisters of the Cross Convent, a private, French-English school, was built there seven years later in 1914.

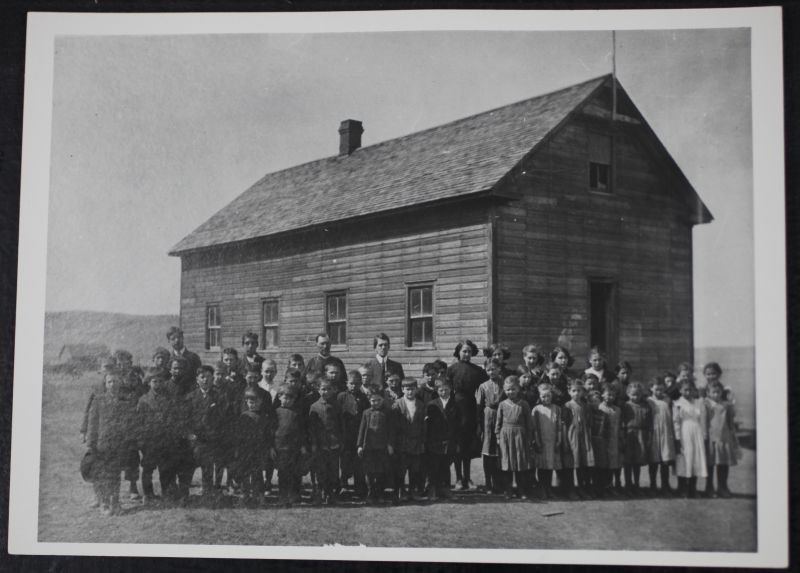
Teachers and students in front of Sitkala R.C.P.# 23, 1913

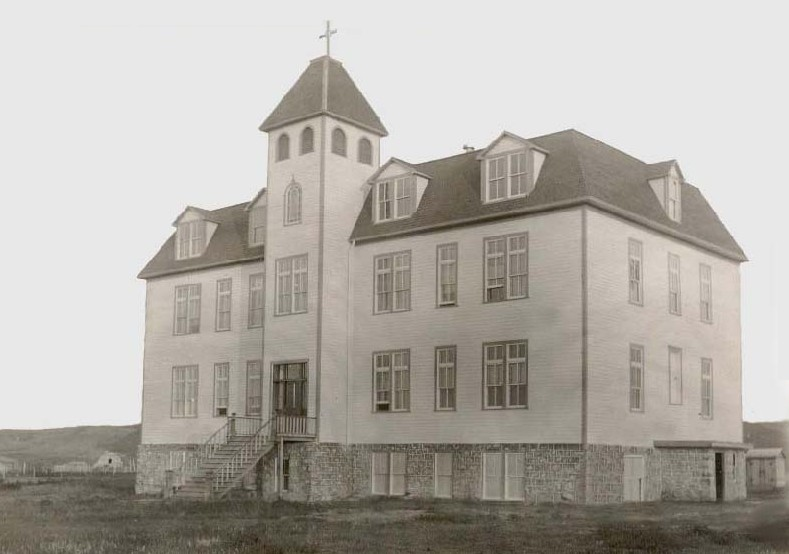
Sisters of the Cross Convent

Since Saskatchewan had been formed in 1905, both schools fell under the province's jurisdiction. In turn, they had to abide by the Saskatchewan Act. Under the Act, their right to French education was protected. Just over 25 years later, this right no longer existed.

In 1931, the School Act prohibited French as the sole language of instruction in schools. However, it allowed students to be taught solely in French from Kindergarten to Grade 1. Students in higher grades were able to learn in French for one hour each day.

Six years later, in 1937, Sitkala R.C.P. joined the public school system. Increasing enrolment rates led the Convent to follow suit, but 12 years later in 1949. The Willow Bunch School was built that same year.

With three schools in the town, minimal French education remained a part of the curriculum. Despite this, students were able to sing French songs in celebration of Saskatchewan's diamond jubilee in 1965. They also sang Polish, Irish, Czech, English and Aboriginal songs. Nonetheless, their francophone parents were not content with the curriculum being taught.

In May 1969, a Willow Bunch advisory board responded to the parents' concern and began campaigning for equal instruction in French at the Willow Bunch School. The Department of Education supported their inquiry, and proposed it to the Borderland School Unit # 4, which administered the school at the time. However, the Unit rejected their proposal for several months. After meetings October through November, the Unit's position changed.

On November 21, the Willow Bunch School officially became bilingual, making it the fifth school in the province to acquire that status. Grade 1 students received equal instruction in French or English. For higher grades, time allotments for French instruction were implemented one year at a time, over six years, until bilingual instruction was offered in all grades. Reading, writing, and mathematics were taught in English, while language instruction, social studies, health education and religious education were offered in both languages. Parents had the option of enrolling their children in the English or French program.

French-instructed classes, like social studies, provided students with a holistic understanding of the history of other peoples in the area. Students learned about the clothing, spiritual beliefs, dwellings, nutrition, languages and recreational activities of First Nations peoples. The Métis were also included in these teachings, but only regarding their participation in the 1885 North-West Rebellion

The provincial government promised to help with the school's increased costs attributed to it being bilingual. However, in 1977, the French program only had four full-time teachers. The English program had 30.

By then, French had already become less-spoken in peoples' homes. In 1961, 477 people most often spoke it at home. By 1976, there were only 235.

Since the Willow Bunch School closed in 2007, this number has dropped to 15.

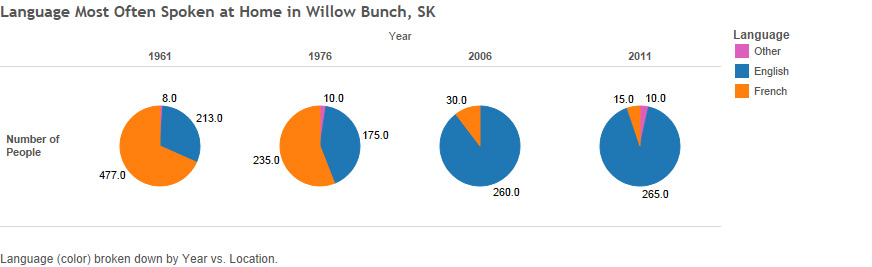
Language Most Often Spoken at Home in Willow Bunch, SK: 1961-2011

The Willow Bunch School was closed in 2007. Students are now bused to the nearby communities of Assiniboia, Bengough, and Coronach.

== Architecture and built environment ==
According to the Census of Canada, the town has 160 private dwellings with the latest of them being built in 1990.

=== Notable buildings and locations ===
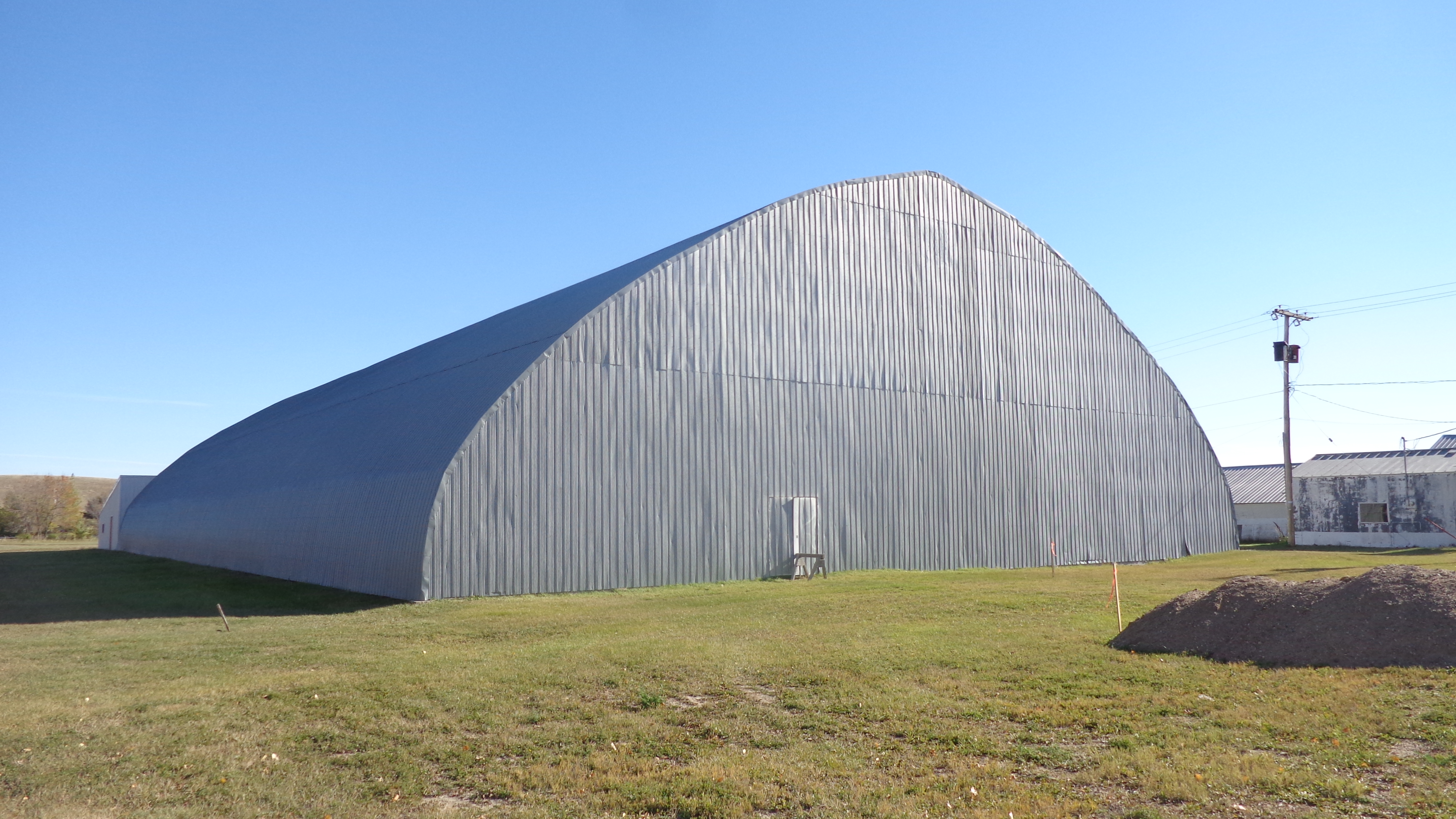
Willow Bunch Community Skating Rink

==== Skating Rink ====
Willow Bunch has had two skating rinks before the current one. The current community skating rink was built in 1957, and a lobby was added in 1959.

==== Willow Bunch Museum ====
Originally built as a convent in 1914 by the Sisters of the Cross, this three-storey mansard-roof edifice is now Willow Bunch Museum. Planning and construction of the convent began in April 1914. During the First World War construction was momentarily suspended as many of the workers who were originally from France left the town to fight in the war. Because of this, the interior of the top floor was never finished. The building also has served as a private and public school during its existence. The building was put up for sale in 1983 due to declining members of the convent, and the school division no longer renting classroom space, and was purchased by the town in 1985 to house the museum.

== See also ==
- List of francophone communities in Saskatchewan
