= Carmen Campagne =

Canadian singer and children's entertainer

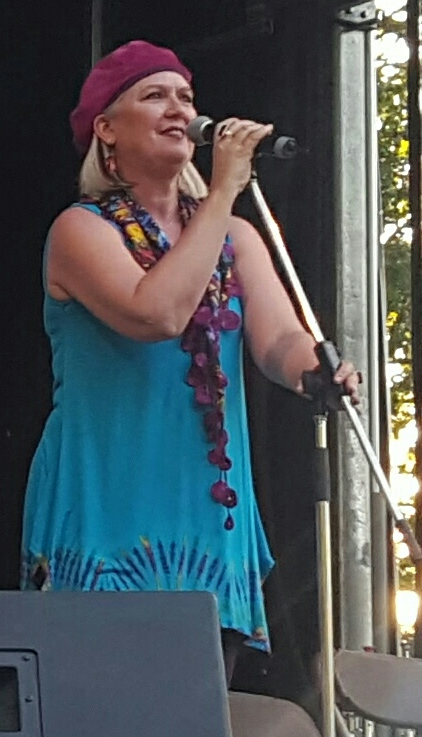
- Campagne in July 2017
- Born: September 8, 1959; Willow Bunch, Saskatchewan, Canada
- Died: July 4, 2018 (aged 58); Sainte-Agathe-des-Monts, Quebec, Canada

Carmen Campagne CM (September 8, 1959 – July 4, 2018) was a Canadian singer and children's entertainer. She, along with Connie Kaldor, received a Juno Award at the 1989 Award ceremony in the category Best Children's Album for Lullaby Berceuse. A Fransaskoise from Willow Bunch, Saskatchewan, she was a member of the folk music band Folle Avoine in the 1970s. Her brother Paul Campagne and sisters Suzanne Campagne, Michelle Campagne and Annette Campagne, her bandmates in Folle Avoine, have also continued in music with the folk band Hart-Rouge.

In 2013, she was made a Member of the Order of Canada "for her contributions as a singer, songwriter and composer enhancing music for young children and using music in French-language education".

Campagne died of cancer at age 58 on July 4, 2018, in Sainte-Agathe-des-Monts, Quebec.
