= CISM-FM =

Campus radio station of the Université de Montréal

Coordinates: 45°30′20″N 73°35′30″W

- Montreal, Quebec; Canada
- Broadcast area: Greater Montreal
- Frequency: 89.3 MHz
- Branding: CISM 89,3 FM — la marge

Programming
- Format: campus radio

Ownership
- Owner: Communication du Versant Nord inc. (non-profit organisation)

History
- First air date: March 14, 1991
- Call sign meaning: Communication Information Sur la Montagne

Technical information
- Licensing authority: CRTC
- Class: B
- ERP: 10 kW
- HAAT: 242.5 metres (796 ft)

Links
- Website: cism.umontreal.ca

CISM-FM is the official campus radio station of the Université de Montréal. It is run by student volunteers and can be heard in Montreal and its outlying regions at 89.3 FM or by Internet users around the world through online streaming. CISM broadcasts in French.

As early as 1970, Université de Montréal students developed the idea of a French college radio station. In 1980, a requested feasibility study gave place to recommendations for a potential radio broadcasting school. At noon on October 7, 1985, CISM broadcast its first radio show over the university's campus. In July 1990, CISM gained its FM broadcast permit from the Canadian Radio-television and Telecommunications Commission (CRTC). Then, on March 14, 1991, CISM's broadcasting antenna (located atop Mount Royal) was boosted to 10,000 watts. With a broadcasting radius of 70 km (40 miles), CISM is now the world's largest French-language college radio station.

The station also broadcasts a Tamil language radio format on a subsidiary communications multiplex operation frequency, branded as International Tamil Radio (ITR-FM). ITR-FM has recently been granted approval for a 50-watt station on FM 102.9 in the Ahuntsic neighbourhood.
