= David Jalbert (folk musician) =

Canadian folk musician and singer-songwriter (born 1980)

- Born: May 5, 1980 (age 45)
- Origin: Canada
- Occupations: Folk musician and Singer-songwriter

David Jalbert (born May 5, 1980) is a Canadian folk musician and singer-songwriter. He is from Mascouche, Québec. He plays guitar and sings.

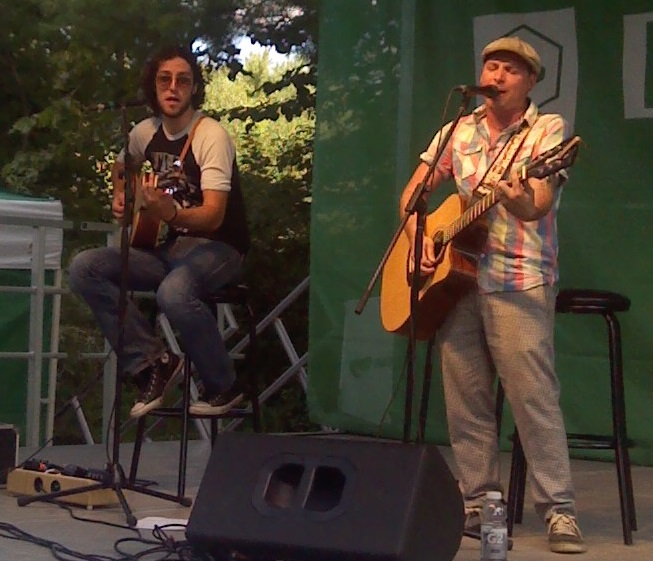
David Jalbert during an outdoor concert

== Early life ==
David Jalbert grew up in Mascouche, more precisely in the Domaine Lac Samson. His father is a guitarist. This influenced his lifestyle. Jalbert became fascinated with music when he was very young. During elementary school, his passion developed gradually. His parents put him in various competitions and he loved this artist lifestyle. When he was a child, he was inspired by The Colocs, C.C.R, The Beatles, Plume Latraverse, Jonh Mellencamp, Beau Dommage and Bob Dylan.

In 1994, Jalbert joined a band of three. The group was called Big Joe, and they played punk rock music. After that, he focused on his studies to finish school and to later be able to get a job. Meanwhile, he continued to write and compose songs.

== Music career ==
=== Des histoires ===
In 2000, Jalbert again played music in several competitions. In 2004, he played in the Mascouche competition MusiQualité, where he won two prizes. The first one was public's choice and the second one was jury's choice. Through various competitions, he had professional encounters with Yves Marchand, Charles Dubé and the producer Alain Dupuis. They helped him to prepare his first album called Des histoires. They chose thirteen titles from amongst thirty songs. The album was launched on April 15, 2008. He started playing concerts to promote the album on August 26, 2008, during the FrancoFolies of Montreal. It was followed by a tour through the Québec.

The song "Souvenir d'enfance" was the most successful song from the album. It became popular on the radio, and it was used in a McDonald's advertisement. His creative director, Mathieu Dandurand won the prize for production of the year at the gala of Terre-Neuve. Jalbert was nominated for two categories for French songwriters (he was nominated again in those categories in 2010). His second prize was for the Artiste de la relève. He got the most nomination of any artist in the year. In 2009, he played in the Studio-Théâtre de la Place des arts three times and many other times in the Cabaret juste pour rire.

The song "Raison" was the second most successful from the album. It was more successful with critics than Jalbert thought it would be. "L'aveugle" was the third radio hit. By autumn 2009, there were three music videos, forty shows and more than 15,000 albums were sold.

=== Le journal ===
On May 4, 2010, Jalbert released his second studio album Le journal. It contained the hit songs "Voyage", "Le journal", "P'tit homme", "Rendez-vous" and "Y'a pu une once". The song "Voyage" was a commercial success, and was at the top of the charts of major stations in Montreal and Québec. The song "P'tit homme" was written for Jalbert's son Félix. Later in 2010, Jalbert was invited on the TV show Salut, Bonjour! for a cultural chronic, and he played in the park Philippe-Villeneuve during the National Day festivities. In addition, he won a prize of the Socan for his popular song "Voyage", which was among the list of top ten pop songs most popular in 2010.

For the first time in his career, in 2011, he was nominated for best contemporary folk album at the ADISQ awards, for his album named Le journal. The album was critically acclaimed, and is Jalbert's most commercially successful album to date. With Des histoires and Le journal, Jalbert has sold over 25,000 albums. His tour show for Le journal was sold out. There was a second concert at the Lion d'Or in Montreal.

=== Y'a pas de bon silence ===
On September 18, 2012, Jalbert released his third album, Y'a pas de bon silence. This contained the popular song "Hey Jack!", which was song dedicated to his son Jacob. This album was the fourth best selling French album in 2012, with over 2,500 albums sold since its release.

Later in 2012, Jalbert joined a project called Fondation Dédé Fortin. His song "Ma mère disait" was part of the campaign against suicide, which is an initiative of the Quebec Association for Suicide Prevention with the support of psychologists of Quebec.

== Discography ==
Des histoires (2008)

1. "Souvenirs D'enfance" (Second radio hit heard)
2. "Elle rêve d'un homme"
3. "Raison" (Third radio hit heard)
4. "La pédagogie des amoureux"
5. "Shérif du village"
6. "Les fantômes" (First radio hit heard)
7. "Hier encore"
8. "Les vacances"
9. "L'étoffe d'un héros"
10. "Deux coquerelles"
11. "L'aveugle" (Fourth radio hit heard)
12. "Référendum"
13. "Effervescence"

Le journal (2010)

1. "Le journal" (Second radio hit heard)
2. "Rendez-vous" (Fourth radio hit heard)
3. "Voyage" (First radio hit heard)
4. "P'tit homme" (Third radio hit heard)
5. "Envoye-donc!"
6. "L'abus"
7. "Ya pu une once" (Fifth radio hit heard)
8. "CPE"
9. "En ville"
10. "No problemo"
11. "Notre histoire"
12. "Les vrais chums"
13. "L'enfer ou le paradis"
14. "Et la neige"

Y'a pas de bon silence (2012)

1. "Jour de paye"
2. "Né du bon côté"
3. "Au bout du chemin"
4. "Y'a pas de bon silence"
5. "Hey Jack" (First radio hit heard)
6. "Des victimes du temps"
7. "Ma mère disait" (Second radio hit heard)
8. "Les embûches"
9. "L'hymne à la Montérégie"
10. "Des crampes dans les orteils"
11. "Si Dieu"
12. "La ruée vers l'or"
13. "Petit à petit"
14. "Mercredi soir"

De L'amour propre (2014)

1. "Rassure-moi"
2. "À couteaux tirés"
3. "Les gladiateurs de la glace"
4. "De l'amour propre"
5. "Two d'travers"
6. "À boire à boire"
7. "Nos belles années"
8. "On a tous une bonne excuse"
9. "Deux mille ans"
10. "Nécrophile"
11. "Le logement"
12. "L'entreprise"

5 (2017)

1. "Libre de partir"
2. "Appelle-moi"
3. "Kilimandjaro"
4. "Mimi & Gaston"
5. "Les couloirs de l'école"
6. "Aly"
7. "Laisse-moé pas me sauver"
8. "Oh Jolie Lolita"
9. "Le monde n'est pas du monde"
10. "Fleurs de macadam"
11. "L'aspirateur"
12. "Qu'attendais-Tu ?"

Le doigt d'honneur (2020)

1. "Le doigt d'honneur"
2. "Y mouille en plein soleil"
3. "Avec le temps"
4. "Back to the shack"
5. "L'amour est ponctuel"
6. "Une Ballade Country"
7. "La tête sur mon épaule"
8. "Un p'tit rien"
9. "Sans larme et sans adieu"
10. "L'ombre de nous"
11. "Nashville, Tennessee"
12. "La tête sur mon épaule"

Le doigt d'honneur Tome II (2022)

1. "Battleship"
2. "Follow me"
3. "Qui sommes-nous pour juger"
4. "Sur mon wall"
5. "Le vent du nord"
6. "Le quai de New Orleans"
7. "800 KM"
8. "Ne pleurons plus"
9. "Hymne aux défunts"
10. "M. Le croque mort"
11. "Sobre, sombre et seul"

New Orleans, C'est la vie (2025)

1. "Bêtise humaine"
2. "Y'en aura pas d'facile"
3. "Alléluia"
4. "Donne-moé de l'amour"
5. "Maudit bonasse"
6. "Mon oncle Edmond"
7. "La famille s'agrandit"
8. "Jambalaya"

== Videos ==
- June 2008: Les fantômes
- November 2008: Souvenirs d'enfance and an advertising with the restaurants McDonald's.
- March 2009: Raison
- October 2010 : Le Journal
- August 2012 : Hey Jack!

== Awards and nominations ==
- 2011: Medal of National assembly.
- 2011: Price of the Socan for the song Voyage.
- 2011: Nomination in the ADISQ for folk album of the year Le journal.
- 2010: Nomination in annual gala prices of Canadian folk music – francophone songwriter.
- 2008: Nomination in annual gala prices of Canadian folk music- Artiste de la relève.
- 2008: Nomination in annual gala prices of Canadian folk music- francophone songwriter.
