= Jean-Louis Légaré =

Historical French-Canadian trader

- Born: October 25, 1841; Saint-Jacques-de-l’Achigan (Saint-Jacques), Canada East
- Died: February 1, 1918 (aged 76); Willow Bunch, Saskatchewan, Canada
- Occupations: fur trader, rancher, businessman and office holder.
- Known for: friend of Sitting Bull
- Spouse: Marie Ouellette (Died 1876-12-04)
- Children: Albert Joseph

Jean-Louis Légaré was a French-Canadian trader and one of the founding members of Willow Bunch, Saskatchewan.

He was born in Saint-Jacques, Montcalm County, Canada East on October 25, 1841, to François-Xavier Légaré and Julie Melençon. He left in 1866 to find work first in the United States and then in Minnesota. After working as a clerk and freighter around Pembina, Dakota Territory for Métis traders. In 1870, he went to Wood Mountain, Saskatchewan, then a Métis hivernant settlement and worked for a Métis merchant, Antonine Ouellette. He later became an independent trader with his own trading post in 1871 and continued working alongside the Métis. He married Marie Ouellette on April 22, 1873, at St. Florent in Lebret, Saskatchewan. Marie Ouellette was the daughter of Francois Ouellette, a Métis trader. On October 5, 1875, Marie gave birth to their only child, Albert Joseph Légaré, at Wood Mountain, Saskatchewan. A year later, in 1876, Marie died after falling off a horse while travelling to visit her father in Fort Walsh, Saskatchewan. He never remarried.

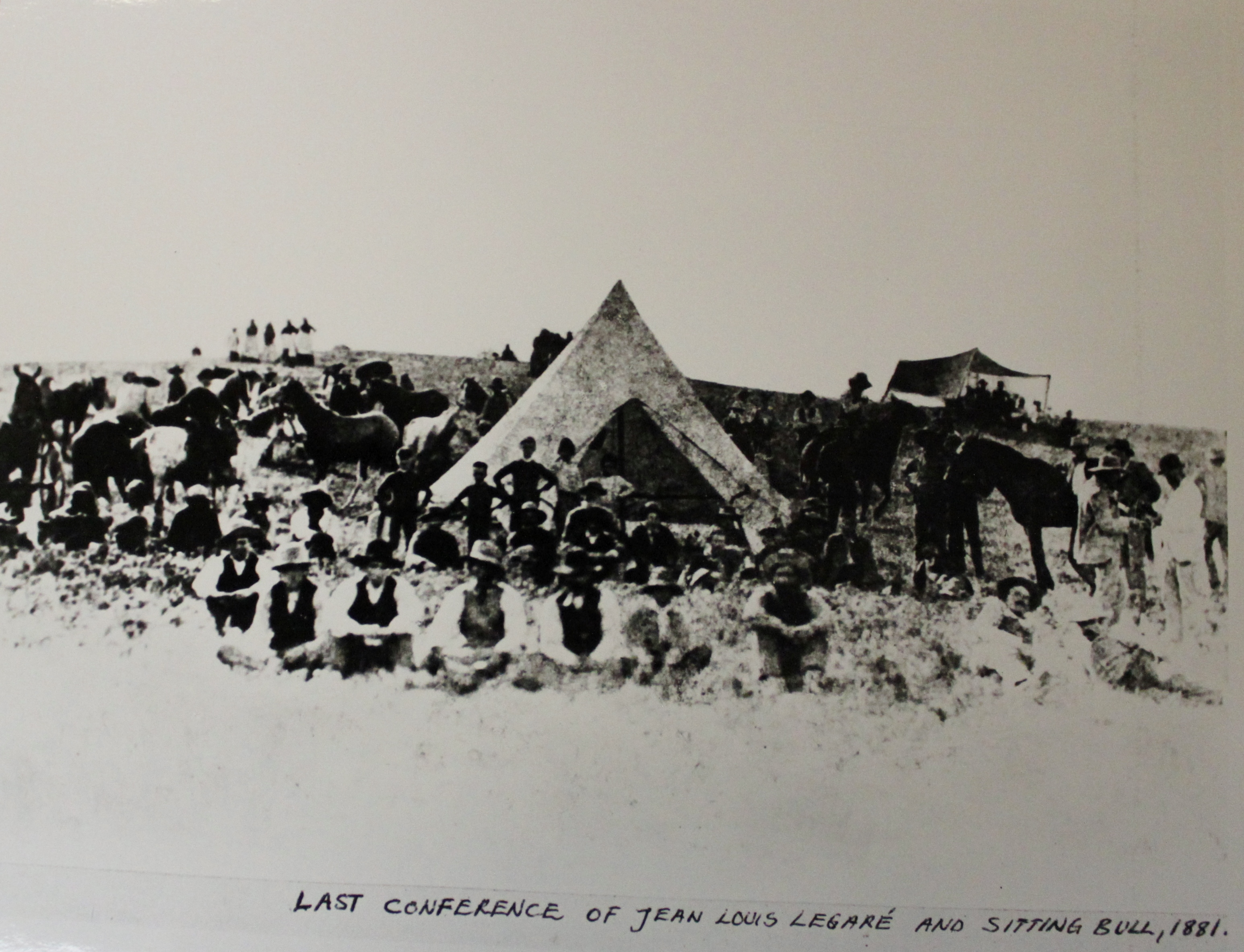
Last conference between Légaré and Sitting Bull in 1881

Between 1876 and 1881 nearly 5,000 Sioux and their chief Sitting Bull took refuge in the Wood Mountain region after the Battle of the Little Big Horn and traded at his post. By 1879 the Sioux were destitute because the buffalo had disappeared from the area. Légaré spent a great deal of effort and supplies to feed the starving Sioux. Since the U.S. government offered amnesty and supplies Légaré at the request of L.N.F. Crozier (North-West Mounted Police) persuaded them to return to the United States. He accompanied Sitting Bull to Fort Buford in 1881.

"On entering the fort, Sitting Bull is reported to have said to the American officers: "I heard that the Government want me to return, Jean Louis told me so I took his word And Came Back With my friend."

During the North-West Rebellion in 1885 he negotiated with the federal government for the employment of 40 Métis from the area. They patrolled the Canada–United States border as scouts during the Métis resistance. In the 1880s he was a cattle and horse rancher in the Willow Bunch area. Légaré became one of the first postmasters of Willow Bunch in 1898 and again in 1902 and held the position until his death on February 1, 1918.

== Legacy ==
In 1960 the Jean-Louis Légaré Regional Park was established 2 km west of Willow Bunch.

In 1969 Jean-Louis Légaré was designated by the Canadian government as being nationally significant in the history of the country. A plaque in Willow Bunch reads:

"Trader and pioneer settler of Willow Bunch, where he opened a post in 1880, Jean-Louis Légaré, a native of Quebec, had entered the fur trade at Wood Mountain in 1870. He became the trusted friend and unofficial spokesman for the Indian and Métis people. When the Sioux under Sitting Bull fled to Canada in 1876 Légaré played a key role, with the N.W.M.P., in maintaining peace and persuading the Sioux to return to the United States." Parks Canada

Jean-Louis Légaré was recognized in Saskatchewan with The Jean-Louis Légaré Act in 1993.

"The people of Saskatchewan hereby recognize the heroic efforts, humane compassion and personal financial sacrifice made by Jean-Louis Légaré with respect to Chief Sitting Bull and his people during their years of refuge in what is now the Province of Saskatchewan." (The Jean-Louis Légaré Act 1993)
