= Canadian Folk Music Award for Contemporary Singer of the Year =

Annual music award

The Canadian Folk Music Award for Contemporary Singer of the Year is an annual music award, presented by the Canadian Folk Music Awards to honour the best vocal performances in contemporary folk music by Canadian artists.

== 2000s ==
Year	Nominee	Album	Ref
2005; 1st Canadian Folk Music Awards
2005; 1st Canadian Folk Music Awards	Lynn Miles	Love Sweet Love	
2005; 1st Canadian Folk Music Awards	Dave Gunning	Two Bit World	
2005; 1st Canadian Folk Music Awards	John Wort Hannam	Dynamite and Dozers	
2005; 1st Canadian Folk Music Awards	Connie Kaldor	Sky with Nothing to Get in the Way	
2005; 1st Canadian Folk Music Awards	Gordie Sampson	Sunburn	
2006; 2nd Canadian Folk Music Awards
2006; 2nd Canadian Folk Music Awards	Jim Byrnes	House of Refuge	
2006; 2nd Canadian Folk Music Awards	Bruce Cockburn	Life Short Call Now	
2006; 2nd Canadian Folk Music Awards	Stephen Fearing	Yellowjacket	
2006; 2nd Canadian Folk Music Awards	Lennie Gallant	When We Get There	
2006; 2nd Canadian Folk Music Awards	Ron Hynes	Ron Hynes	
2007; 3rd Canadian Folk Music Awards
2007; 3rd Canadian Folk Music Awards	David Francey	Right of Passage	
2007; 3rd Canadian Folk Music Awards	Jill Barber	For All Time	
2007; 3rd Canadian Folk Music Awards	Bruce Cockburn	Life Short Call Now	
2007; 3rd Canadian Folk Music Awards	Jeremy Fisher	Goodbye Blue Monday	
2007; 3rd Canadian Folk Music Awards	T. Nile	At My Table	
2007; 3rd Canadian Folk Music Awards	Dawn Tyler Watson	En Duo	
2008; 4th Canadian Folk Music Awards
2008; 4th Canadian Folk Music Awards	Tannis Slimmon	Lucky Blue	
2008; 4th Canadian Folk Music Awards	Dave Carroll	Perfect Blue	
2008; 4th Canadian Folk Music Awards	Rita Chiarelli	Uptown Goes Downtown	
2008; 4th Canadian Folk Music Awards	Amos Garrett	Get Way Back: A Tribute to Percy Mayfield	
2008; 4th Canadian Folk Music Awards	Wyckham Porteous	3AM	
2009; 5th Canadian Folk Music Awards
2009; 5th Canadian Folk Music Awards	Jim Byrnes	My Walking Stick	
2009; 5th Canadian Folk Music Awards	Marianne Girard	Pirate Days	
2009; 5th Canadian Folk Music Awards	Melissa McClelland	Victoria Day	
2009; 5th Canadian Folk Music Awards	Jessica Rhaye	Good Things	
2009; 5th Canadian Folk Music Awards	Suzie Vinnick	Happy Here	

== 2010s ==
Year	Nominee	Album	Ref
2010; 6th Canadian Folk Music Awards
2010; 6th Canadian Folk Music Awards	Rose Cousins	The Send Off	
2010; 6th Canadian Folk Music Awards	James Keelaghan	House of Cards	
2010; 6th Canadian Folk Music Awards	Lynn Miles	Black Flowers Volume 1 & 2	
2010; 6th Canadian Folk Music Awards	Nathan Rogers	The Gauntlet	
2010; 6th Canadian Folk Music Awards	Justin Rutledge	The Early Widows	
2011; 7th Canadian Folk Music Awards
2011; 7th Canadian Folk Music Awards	Suzie Vinnick	Me 'n' Mabel	
2011; 7th Canadian Folk Music Awards	Matthew Barber	Matthew Barber	
2011; 7th Canadian Folk Music Awards	Bruce Cockburn	Small Source of Comfort	
2011; 7th Canadian Folk Music Awards	Cat Jahnke	The Stories are Taking Their Toll	
2011; 7th Canadian Folk Music Awards	David Myles	Live at the Carleton	
2012; 8th Canadian Folk Music Awards
2012; 8th Canadian Folk Music Awards	Rose Cousins	We Have Made a Spark	
2012; 8th Canadian Folk Music Awards	Craig Cardiff	Floods and Fires	
2012; 8th Canadian Folk Music Awards	Geraldine Hollett	Row Upon Row of the People They Know	
2012; 8th Canadian Folk Music Awards	Keri Latimer	Crowsfeet and Greyskull	
2012; 8th Canadian Folk Music Awards	Catherine MacLellan	Silhouette	
2013; 9th Canadian Folk Music Awards
2013; 9th Canadian Folk Music Awards	Ian Sherwood	Live at the Hive	
2013; 9th Canadian Folk Music Awards	Stephen Fearing	Between Hurricanes	
2013; 9th Canadian Folk Music Awards	John Wort Hannam	Brambles and Thorns	
2013; 9th Canadian Folk Music Awards	Old Man Luedecke	Tender Is the Night	
2013; 9th Canadian Folk Music Awards	Justin Rutledge	Valleyheart	
2014; 10th Canadian Folk Music Awards
2014; 10th Canadian Folk Music Awards	Matt Andersen	Weightless	
2014; 10th Canadian Folk Music Awards	Del Barber	Prairieography	
2014; 10th Canadian Folk Music Awards	Matthew Barber	Big Romance	
2014; 10th Canadian Folk Music Awards	James Keelaghan	History	
2014; 10th Canadian Folk Music Awards	Jadea Kelly	Clover	
2015; 11th Canadian Folk Music Awards
2015; 11th Canadian Folk Music Awards	Amelia Curran	They Promised You Mercy	
2015; 11th Canadian Folk Music Awards	Peter Katz	We Are the Reckoning	
2015; 11th Canadian Folk Music Awards	Sarah MacDougall	Grand Canyon	
2015; 11th Canadian Folk Music Awards	Catherine MacLellan	The Raven's Sun	
2015; 11th Canadian Folk Music Awards	Jory Nash	The Many Hats of Jory Nash	
2016; 12th Canadian Folk Music Awards
2016; 12th Canadian Folk Music Awards	Jadea Kelly	Love & Lust	
2016; 12th Canadian Folk Music Awards	Matt Andersen	Honest Man	
2016; 12th Canadian Folk Music Awards	Megan Bonnell	Magnolia	
2016; 12th Canadian Folk Music Awards	Danny Michel	Matadora	
2016; 12th Canadian Folk Music Awards	William Prince	Earthly Days	
2017; 13th Canadian Folk Music Awards
2017; 13th Canadian Folk Music Awards	Stephen Fearing	Every Soul's a Sailor	
2017; 13th Canadian Folk Music Awards	Coco Love Alcorn	Wonderland	
2017; 13th Canadian Folk Music Awards	Abigail Lapell	Hide Nor Hair	
2017; 13th Canadian Folk Music Awards	Lisa LeBlanc	Why You Wanna Leave, Runaway Queen?	
2017; 13th Canadian Folk Music Awards	Oh Susanna	A Girl in Teen City	
2018; 14th Canadian Folk Music Awards
2018; 14th Canadian Folk Music Awards	Rob Lutes	Walk in the Dark	
2018; 14th Canadian Folk Music Awards	Kellie Loder	Benefit of the Doubt	
2018; 14th Canadian Folk Music Awards	Catherine MacLellan	If It's Alright With You: The Songs of Gene MacLellan	
2018; 14th Canadian Folk Music Awards	Dylan Menzie	As the Clock Rewinds	
2018; 14th Canadian Folk Music Awards	Dana Wylie	The Earth That You're Made Of	

== 2020s ==
Year	Nominee	Album	Ref
2020; 15th Canadian Folk Music Awards
2020; 15th Canadian Folk Music Awards	Matt Andersen	Halfway Home By Morning	
2020; 15th Canadian Folk Music Awards	Jenn Grant	Love, Inevitable	
2020; 15th Canadian Folk Music Awards	Dave Gunning	Up Against the Sky	
2020; 15th Canadian Folk Music Awards	Lydia Persaud	Let Me Show You	
2020; 15th Canadian Folk Music Awards	Andrea Ramolo	Homage	
2021; 16th Canadian Folk Music Awards
2021; 16th Canadian Folk Music Awards	Coco Love Alcorn	Rebirth	
2021; 16th Canadian Folk Music Awards	Basia Bulat	Are You in Love?	
2021; 16th Canadian Folk Music Awards	Tim Chaisson	Yours to Break	
2021; 16th Canadian Folk Music Awards	Catherine MacLellan	Coyote	
2021; 16th Canadian Folk Music Awards	William Prince	Reliever	
2022; 17th Canadian Folk Music Awards
2022; 17th Canadian Folk Music Awards	Rob Lutes	Come Around	
2022; 17th Canadian Folk Music Awards	Kelly Bado	Hey Terre	
2022; 17th Canadian Folk Music Awards	Craig Cardiff	All This Time Running	
2022; 17th Canadian Folk Music Awards	Denise Flack	Good Water	
2022; 17th Canadian Folk Music Awards	Terra Spencer	Chasing Rabbits	
2023; 18th Canadian Folk Music Awards
2023; 18th Canadian Folk Music Awards	Kyle McKearney	Down-Home	
2023; 18th Canadian Folk Music Awards	Barney Bentall	Cosmic Dreamer	
2023; 18th Canadian Folk Music Awards	Boy Golden	Church of Better Daze	
2023; 18th Canadian Folk Music Awards	Angelique Francis	Long River	
2023; 18th Canadian Folk Music Awards	Ken Yates	Cerulean	
2024; 19th Canadian Folk Music Awards
2024; 19th Canadian Folk Music Awards	Suzie Vinnick	Fall Back Home	
2024; 19th Canadian Folk Music Awards	Kaeley Jade	Turpentine	
2024; 19th Canadian Folk Music Awards	Joe Nolan	Lost Verses	
2024; 19th Canadian Folk Music Awards	Terra Spencer	Old News	
2024; 19th Canadian Folk Music Awards	Julian Taylor	Beyond the Reservoir	
2025; 20th Canadian Folk Music Awards
2025; 20th Canadian Folk Music Awards	Jeffery Straker	Great Big Sky	
2025; 20th Canadian Folk Music Awards	Derina Harvey	Waves of Home	
2025; 20th Canadian Folk Music Awards	Camille Intson	Poems in the Ashes	
2025; 20th Canadian Folk Music Awards	Ndidi Onukwulu	Simple Songs for Complicated Times	
2025; 20th Canadian Folk Music Awards	Esther Wheaton	Foul Weather Friends	
2026; 21st Canadian Folk Music Awards
2026; 21st Canadian Folk Music Awards	Julian Taylor	Pathways	
2026; 21st Canadian Folk Music Awards	AHI	The Light Behind the Sun	
2026; 21st Canadian Folk Music Awards	Stephen Fearing	The Empathist	
2026; 21st Canadian Folk Music Awards	Mia Kelly	To Be Clear	
2026; 21st Canadian Folk Music Awards	Kyle McKearney	To the River	
