= 21st Canadian Folk Music Awards =

2026 music awards ceremony

- Date: April 9-12, 2026
- Location: Calgary, Alberta
- Country: Canada
- Website: folkawards.ca

The 21st Canadian Folk Music Awards were presented from April 9 to 12, 2026, in Calgary, Alberta, at venues including the Bella Concert Hall, the Westin Calgary Ballroom and the National Music Centre.

Nominations were announced in October 2025.

== Nominees and recipients ==
Traditional Album	Contemporary Album
Matthew Byrne, Stealing Time; The Barrel Boys, Chicken in the Window; Cassie and Maggie, Gold and Coal; Max Francis, Home; Richard Wood, Richard Wood Live! An Evening of Celtic Music	AHI, The Light Behind the Sun; Boreal, Winterbirds; The Fretless, Glasswing; Claire Morrison, Where Do You Go at Night?; Sacred Wolf Singers and Simon Walls, L’nu’k Mawiejik
Children's Album	Traditional Singer
Ginalina, All the Earth Speaks; James Culleton, Superfolk; Heather Feather, Together; Oh Clementine, One Thousand Mornings; Marky Weinstock and Friends, Here for You!	Matthew Byrne, Stealing Time; Sam Allison, Original Works for Voice and Banjo; Mathieu Baillargeon, Âmes des bois; Michael Darcy, Homemade; Maggie MacDonald, Gold and Coal
Contemporary Singer	Instrumental Solo Artist
Julian Taylor, Pathways; AHI, The Light Behind the Sun; Stephen Fearing, The Empathist; Mia Kelly, To Be Clear; Kyle McKearney, To the River	Rachel Therrien, Mi Hogar II; Olivia Barrett, Elsewhere; Yves Cloutier, Fleuve; Scott Duncan, Grandpa and Me; Max Francis, Home
Instrumental Group	English Songwriter
The Fretless, Glasswing; Amir Amiri Ensemble, Adjad/Ancestors: Echoes of Persia; Amir Eslami, Multicultural Wind Ensemble; Ladom Ensemble, Sofreh Tisch; Jocelyn Pettit and Ellen Gira, Here to Stay	Terra Spencer, Sunset; AHI, The Light Behind the Sun; Mia Kelly, To Be Clear; Shane Pendergast, Winter Grace; Suzie Ungerleider, Among the Evergreens
French Songwriter	Indigenous Songwriter
Guillaume Arsenault, Les plantes continuent de pousser même quand tu dors – Face B; Maude Carrier, Les journées grises; Fred Dionne, Eldorado; Yves Marchand, Tellement naturel; Sandie Valiquette, Forêt Marine	Aysanabee, Edge of the Earth; PIQSIQ, Legends; Asiah Holm, The Mask That You Made; Wyatt C. Louis, Chandler; Amanda Rheaume, The Truth We Hold
Vocal Group	Ensemble
PIQSIQ, Legends; The Barrel Boys, Chicken in the Window; Boreal, Winterbirds; Cassie and Maggie, Gold and Coal; Jessica Pearson and the East Wind, Live from Motel Chelsea	Cassie and Maggie, Gold and Coal; Boreal, Winterbirds; Garçons à Marier, La Dot; Jessica Pearson and the East Wind, Live from Motel Chelsea; The Southern Residents, Folk Signals
Solo Artist	Global Roots Album
Lennie Gallant, Shelter from the Storms; Duane Andrews, Duane Andrews and the Hot Club of Conception Bay; Mallory Chipman, Songs to a Wild; Heather MacIsaac, The Moon's Daughter; Terra Spencer, Sunset	Kazdoura, Ghoyoum; Amir Amiri Ensemble, Ajdad/Ancestors, Echoes of Persia; Ahmed Moneka, Kanzafula; Joaquin Nunez & Habana Safari, Ruta de la Clave; Selcuk Suna, The Space Between
Single of the Year	New/Emerging Artist
AHI, "Human Kind"; Aysanabee, "Edge of the Earth"; Rachel Cousins, "To Fail"; Irish Millie, "You Were There"; Sultans of String feat. Shannon Thunderbird, "Lost and Found"	Claire Morrison, Where Do You Go at Night?; Kazdoura, Ghoyoum; Wyatt C. Louis, Chandler; Jessica Pearson and the East Wind, Live from Motel Chelsea; Robert Thomas and the Sessionmen, The Way We Roll
Producer	Pushing the Boundaries
Ben Plotnick — Every Colour Left (Loud in the Pines); Colin Buchanan and Davy Gallant – Shelter From the Storms (Lennie Gallant); Jim Bowskill – Blissful State of Mind (Brooks & Bowskill); Liam Duncan – For Eden (Boy Golden); Rayannah – Where Do You Go at Night? (Claire Morrison	Oktoécho, Saimaniq Sivumut; AHI, The Light Behind the Sun; Calgaréal, Vanishing Points; Cassie and Maggie, Gold and Coal; Payadora, Legend of Carau
Instrumental Composer	Young Performer
Schmaltz and Pepper (Eric Abramovitz, Rebekah Wolkstein, Drew Jurecka), Schmaltz and Pepper; Max Francis, Home; The Fretless, Glasswing; Dane George, Spring Buds; Anne Lindsay, Soloworks 2	Max Francis, Home; Luka Hall, To Be Honest; Irish Millie, Between Then and Now; Ella Gunning Parker, Look Alive; Salt Beef Junkies, Unnamed Demo
Album Artwork
Ru Rose, Revival; The Arrogant Worms, Canadian Famous; Kevin Hutchings, Halcyon Days; Oktoécho, Saimaniq Sivumut; Nastasia Y, Kyiv Soul
