= 19th Canadian Folk Music Awards =

2024 music awards ceremony

- Date: April 6-7, 2024
- Location: Majestic Theatre; St. John's, Newfoundland and Labrador
- Country: Canada
- Hosted by: Tom Power, Emilia Bartellas
- Website: folkawards.ca

The 19th Canadian Folk Music Awards were presented on April 6 and 7, 2024, to honour achievements in folk music by Canadian artists in 2023. Nominations were announced in October 2023.

== Nominees and recipients ==
Traditional Album	Contemporary Album
Jocelyn Pettit and Ellen Gira, All It Brings; The Bookends with the Stratford Symphony Orchestra, A Celtic Celebration; Mary Beth Carty, Crossing the Causeway; La Déferlance, Le feu aux poudres; Meredith Moon, Constellations	William Prince, Stand in the Joy; Jill Barber, Homemaker; The East Pointers, House of Dreams; Lynn Miles, TumbleWeedyWorld; Tami Neilson, Kingmaker; NQ Arbuckle, Love Songs for the Long Game; The Sadies, Colder Streams; Terra Spencer and Ben Caplan, Old News
Children's Album	Traditional Singer
Ginalina, Going Back: Remembered and Remixed Family Fold Songs; Darrelle London, Primary; Mr. Ben, Here Comes the Train; The Relative Minors, Minor Third; The Swinging Belles, Welcome to the Flea Circus	Mary Beth Carty, Crossing the Causeway; Tianna Lefebvre, Roses; Hannah Shira Naiman, The Wheels Won't Go; François-Félix Roy, Peines perdues; La Yeni, Yarrow Under the Moon
Contemporary Singer	Instrumental Solo Artist
Suzie Vinnick, Fall Back Home; Kaeley Jade, Turpentine; Joe Nolan, Lost Verses; Terra Spencer, Old News; Julian Taylor, Beyond the Reservoir	Aaron Collis, Before Daylight in the Morning; Steve Dawson, Phantom Threshold; Joy Lapps, Girl in the Yard; Troy McLaggan, Wood, Steel & Bones; Paul Pike, Echoes of Our Ancestors; Don Ross, Water
Instrumental Group	English Songwriter
Queen Kong, Fray; Archetype Trad, Explorer; Medusa, Medusa; So Long Seven, only elephants know her name; Vinta, Beacons	Jacob Brodovsky, I Love You and I'm Sorry; Noah Derksen, Sanctity of Silence; Luke Doucet and Melissa McClelland, I'm Not Crying, You're Crying; Tim Chaisson, Koady Chaisson, Jake Charron, Colin MacDonald and Carleton Stone, House of Dreams; Dave Gunning, The Same Storm; Noah Zacharin, Points of Light
French Songwriter	Indigenous Songwriter
Aleksi Campagne and Michelle Campagne, For the Giving / Sans rien donner; Éric Dion and André Lavergne, La nouvelle saison; Catherine Durand, La maison orpheline; Catherine-Audrey Lachapelle and Léandre Joly-Pelletier, Là-bas-Veranda; Marie-Ève Laure, Reviens	Kaeley Jade Wiebe, Turpentine; Cynthia Hamar, Joint & Marrow; Kyle McKearney, A Traveler's Lament; Qattuu, Midnight Sun; Geneviève Toupin, Maison vent
Vocal Group	Ensemble
The Bombadils, Dear Friend; Basset, In the Clay; Big Little Lions, AMPM; Musique à bouches, Il est grand temps; Twin Flames, Twin Flames Unplugged Live	Genticorum, Au coeur de l'aube; The Bombadils, Dear Friend; The East Pointers, House of Dreams; Jackson Hollow, Roses; Whitehorse, I'm Not Crying, You're Crying
Solo Artist	Global Roots Album
William Prince, Stand in the Joy; Dave Gunning, The Same Storm; Barbra Lica, Imposter Syndrome; Julian Taylor, Beyond the Reservoir; Julie Title, After the Sun	Sophie Lukacs, Bamako; Empress Nyiringango, Ubuntu; Tarek Ghiri, Refugee in the Sea; Roberto López, Ritual; Taraf Syriana, Taraf Syriana
Single of the Year	New/Emerging Artist
William Prince, "When You Miss Someone"; Aruna and the Sirens, "Have You Seen My Sister?"; Big Little Lions, "Worth the Time"; The Bombadils, "Tell Me I'm Not Dreaming"; Barbra Lica, "In 40 Years"; Moira & Claire, "Delaney's Dad"; Zaac Pick, "Light Under the Door"; Julian Taylor, "Seeds"	Mia Kelly, Garden through the War; La Déferlance, Le feu aux poudres; Kaeley Jade, Turpentine; Moonfruits, Salt; Steven Taetz, Late Bloom; Youngtree and the Blooms, Youngtree and the Blooms
Producer	Pushing the Boundaries
Drew Jurecka and Dan Rosenberg, Silent Tears: The Last Yiddish Tango (Payadora Tango Ensemble); Jill Barber and Erik P. H. Nielsen, Homemaker (Jill Barber); Steve Dawson, Eyes Closed, Dreaming (Steve Dawson); Jeremy Ledbetter, Seré Libre (Eliana Cuevas with the Angel Falls Orchestra); Kaitlin Milroy, Alex Millaire, Charles Fairfield and Olivier Fairfield, Salt (Moonfruits)	Kuné, Universal Echoes; Al Qahwa, Weyn Allah; De Lònga, Codex XXI; Kyle McKearney, A Traveler's Lament; So Long Seven, only elephants know her name
Instrumental Composer	Young Performer
Nathan Smith, Emilyn Stam, John David Williams and Alan Mackie, Beacons; Steve Dawson, Phantom Threshold; Dario Montanino, Rio Lyon; Don Ross, Water; Lorie Wolf, Fray	Mia Kelly, Garden Through the War; Abigale, Different Roads; Fiddelium, Lit Up; Irish Millie, The Trilogy; La Famille LeBlanc, Perdrais-je mon temps... (Would I be losing my time...); Paige Penney, Game Changer
