= 9th Canadian Folk Music Awards =

2013 music awards ceremony

- Date: November 10, 2013
- Location: University of Calgary Theatre, Calgary, Alberta
- Country: Canada
- Hosted by: Shelagh Rogers and Benoit Bourque
- Website: folkawards.ca

The 9th Canadian Folk Music Awards were presented at the University of Calgary Theatre in Calgary, Alberta on November 10, 2013. The ceremony was hosted by the CBC's Shelagh Rogers and musician Benoit Bourque. Overall, 70 artists and groups were announced as nominees in 19 categories who hailed from eight provinces and two territories in Canada. Two additional special category award recipients were announced honouring this year's Unsung Hero and Folk Music Canada's Innovator Award.

== Nominees and recipients ==
Recipients are listed first and highlighted in boldface.

Traditional Album	Contemporary Album
**Mary Jane Lamond and Wendy MacIsaac, Seinn**; Erynn Marshall, Tune Tramp; Pharis and Jason Romero, Long Gone Out West Blues; Vishtèn, Mosaïk; The Lemon Bucket Orkestra, Lume, Lume	**Justin Rutledge, Valleyheart**; David Francey, So Say We All; Lynn Miles, Downpour; Ruth Moody, These Wilder Things; Annabelle Chvostek, Rise
Children's Album	Traditional Singer
**Helen Austin, Always Be a Unicorn**; Jennifer Gasoi, Throw a Penny in the Wishing Well; Gary Rasberry, What's the Big Idea?!?; Madame Diva, Viva la Diva; The Funky Mamas, Pickin' in the Garden	**Pharis Romero, Long Gone Out West Blues**; Mary Jane Lamond, Seinn; Ken Whiteley, The Light of Christmas; Ian Bell, Forget Me Not, When Far Away; The Blue Warblers, Birds
Contemporary Singer	Instrumental Solo Artist
**Ian Sherwood, Live at the Hive**; Justin Rutledge, Valleyheart; Old Man Luedecke, Tender Is the Night; John Wort Hannam, Brambles and Thorns; Stephen Fearing, Between Hurricanes	**Chrissy Crowley, Last Night's Fun**; Rachel Davis, Turns; Stephanie Cadman, Foggy New Year; Maxim Cormier, Maxim Cormier; Jorge Miguel, Guitarra Flamenca/Flamenco Guitar
Instrumental Group	English Songwriter
**Jaron Freeman-Fox & The Opposite of Everything, Jaron Freeman-Fox & The Opposite of Everything**; The Log Drivers, The Log Drivers; The Boxcar Boys, Rye Whiskey; The Lemon Bucket Orkestra, Lume, Lume; Gordon Grdina's Haram, Her Eyes Illuminate	**David Francey, So Say We All**; Justin Rutledge, Valleyheart; Lynn Miles, Downpour; Old Man Luedecke, Tender Is the Night; John Wort Hannam, Brambles and Thorns
French Songwriter	Aboriginal Songwriter
**Dany Placard, Démon vert**; Louis-Jean Cormier, Le treizième étage; Chantal Archambault, Les Élans; Alexis Normand, Mirador; Catherine Durand, Les murs blancs du Nord	**Nancy Mike of The Jerry Cans, Nunavuttitut**; Kristi Lane Sinclair, The Sea Alone; Don Amero, Heart on My Sleeve; Diem Lafortune, Beauty and Hard Times; Vince Fontaine of Indian City, Supernation
Vocal Group	Ensemble
**Good Lovelies, Live at Revolution**; The Wilderness of Manitoba, Island of Echoes; The Sweet Lowdown, May; Dawn and Marra, Teaspoons and Tablespoons; Trent Severn, Trent Severn	**Good Lovelies, Live at Revolution**; Mary Jane Lamond and Wendy MacIsaac, Seinn; Genticorum, Enregistré Live; Corin Raymond and the Sundowners, Paper Nickels; Vishtèn, Mosaïk
Solo Artist	World Solo Artist
**Lynn Miles, Downpour**; David Francey, So Say We All; Maria Dunn, Piece by Piece; John Wort Hannam, Brambles and Thorns; Stephen Fearing, Between Hurricanes	**Jorge Miguel, Guitarra Flamenca/Flamenco Guitar**; Lenka Lichtenberg, Embrace; Sora, Scorpion Moon; Aviva Chernick, When I Arrived You Were Already There; Alex Cuba, Ruido en el Sistema
World Group	New/Emerging Artist
**Jaffa Road, Where the Light Gets In**; Njacko Backo & Kalimba Kalimba, Ici bas, rien n'est impossible (Here Below, Nothing is Impossible); Jaron Freeman-Fox & The Opposite of Everything, Jaron Freeman-Fox & The Opposite of Everything; The Lemon Bucket Orkestra, Lume, Lume; David Buchbinder & Odessa/Havana, Walk to the Sea	**Mo Kenney, Mo Kenney**; Ashley Condon, This Great Compromise; Ten Strings and a Goat Skin, Corbeau; Trent Severn, Trent Severn; The Lemon Bucket Orkestra, Lume, Lume
Producer	Pushing the Boundaries
**David Travers-Smith, These Wilder Things (Ruth Moody) and Jaron Freeman-Fox and The Opposite of Everything**; David Francey, Mark Westberg, Ken Friesen, So Say We All (David Francey); Jory Nash & Chris Stringer, Little Pilgrim (Jory Nash); Steve Dawson, Brother Sinner & the Whale (Kelly Joe Phelps), I Hear the Wind in the Wires (Jim Byrnes); Valley Hennell, The Great Gazzoon: A Tall Tale With Tunes & Turbulence (Rick Scott)	**Jaron Freeman-Fox & The Opposite of Everything, Jaron Freeman-Fox & The Opposite of Everything**; The Wilderness of Manitoba, Island of Echoes; Kevin Breit, Field Recording; Orchid Ensemble, Life Death Tears Dream; New Country Rehab, Ghost of Your Charms
Young Performer	
**Kierah, Stonemason's Daughter**; Ten Strings and a Goat Skin, Corbeau; Rebecca Lappa, Avant Garden; Sydney Delong, My Vow to You; Keiffer Mclean, Keiffer Mclean	

== Other special awards ==
Two special awards were handed out during the gala. Manitoba-based industry stalwart Mitch Podolak was honoured by his folk community peers as this year's Unsung Hero, a special award that highlights the exceptional contributions of an individual, group, or organization to the Canadian folk music scene. Victoria's Daniel Lapp is the recipient of the Folk Music Canada's Innovator Award for his work as a teacher, leader and song collector.
