= Juno Award for Contemporary Roots Album of the Year =

Canadian music award

The Juno Award for Contemporary Roots Album of the Year is presented annually at Canada's Juno Awards to honour the best album of the year in the contemporary roots and folk genre. Prior to 2016, awards for this genre were awarded in two categories: Roots & Traditional - Solo and Roots & Traditional - Group. Beginning with the 2016 ceremony, the solo and group categories were replaced with contemporary and traditional roots categories, to "ensure two genres of music are not competing against each other in the same category".

== Winners and nominees ==
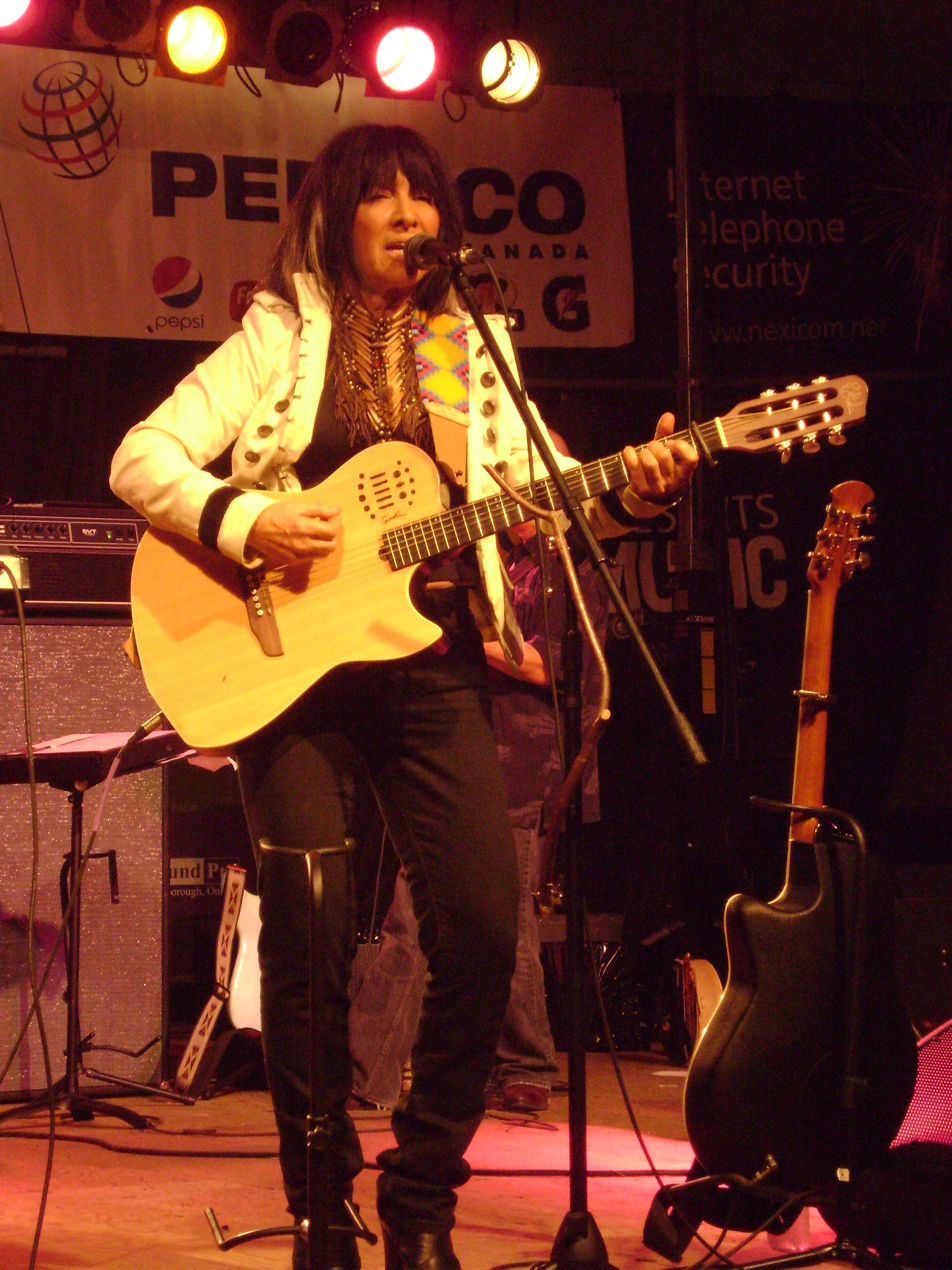
Inaugural award recipient Buffy Sainte-Marie

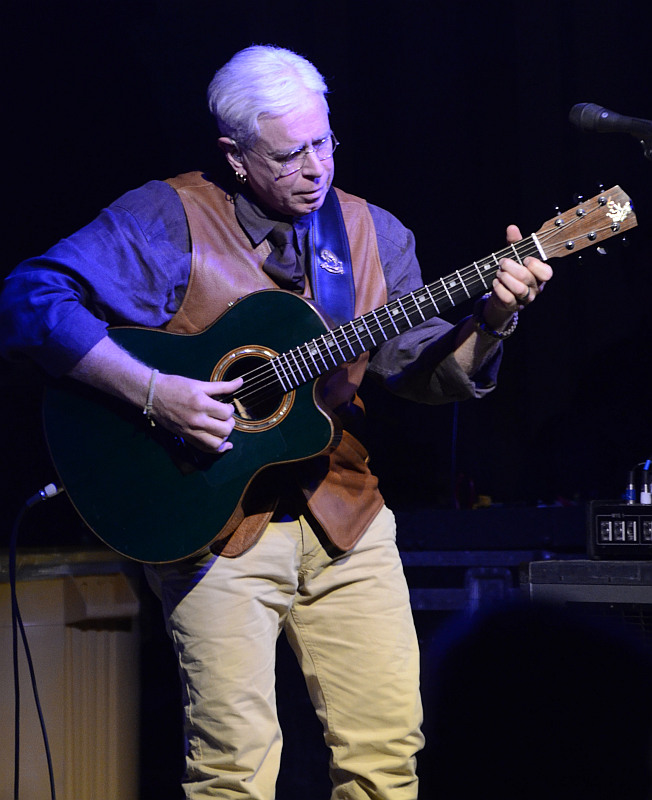
Bruce Cockburn won the award in 2018

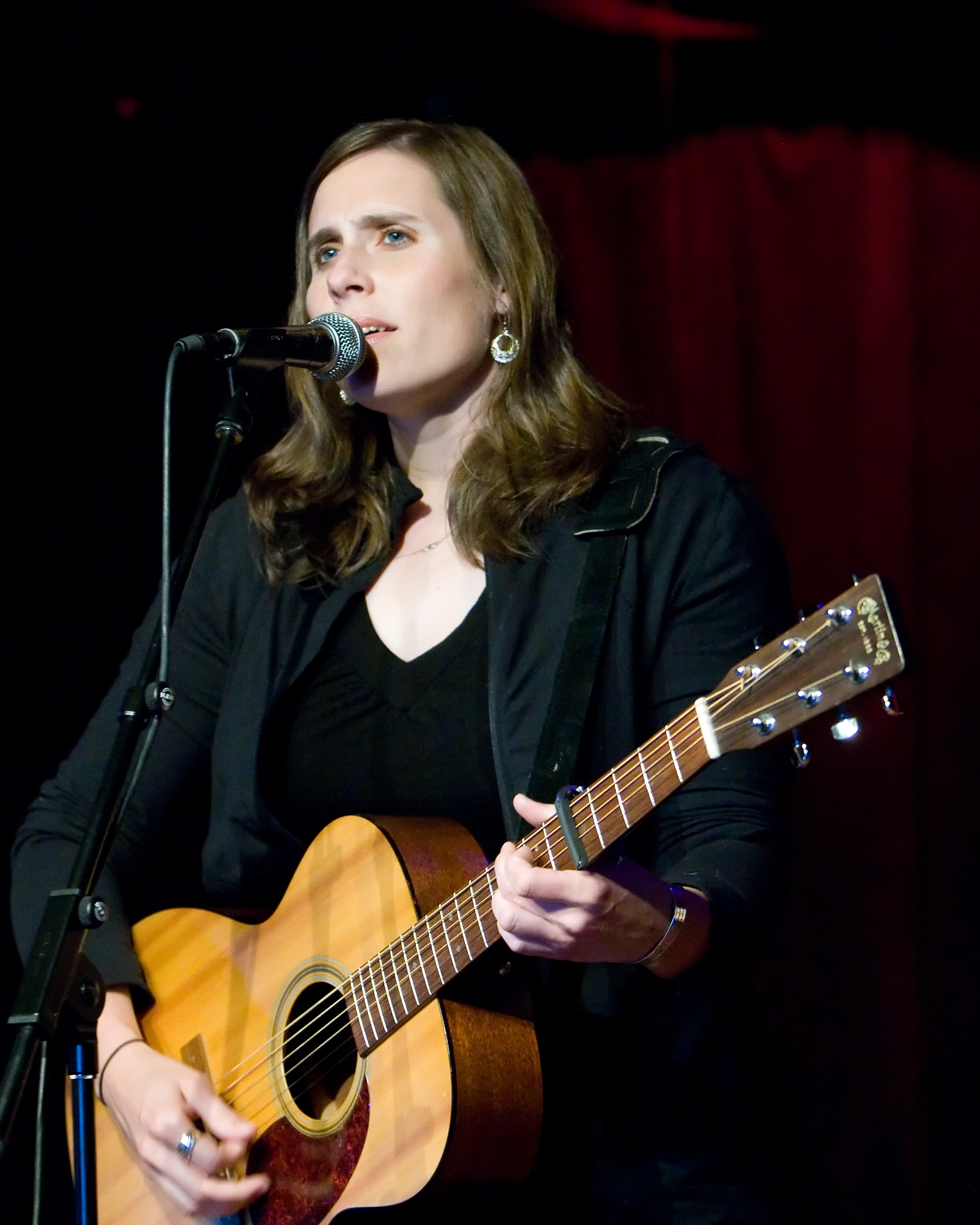
2021 honoree Rose Cousins

Year	Winner(s)	Album	Nominees	Ref.
2016	Buffy Sainte-Marie	Power in the Blood	Alan Doyle, So Let's Go; Frazey Ford, Indian Ocean; Fortunate Ones, The Bliss; Lee Harvey Osmond, Beautiful Scars	
2017	William Prince	Earthly Days	Matthew Barber & Jill Barber, The Family Album; Lisa LeBlanc, Why You Wanna Leave, Runaway Queen?; Corin Raymond, Hobo Jungle Fever Dreams; Kacy & Clayton, Strange Country	
2018	Bruce Cockburn	Bone on Bone	Amelia Curran, Watershed; Buffy Sainte-Marie, Medicine Songs; The Jerry Cans, Inuusiq; The Weather Station, The Weather Station	
2019	Donovan Woods	Both Ways	AHI, In Our Time; The Deep Dark Woods, Yarrow; Kaia Kater, Grenades; Megan Nash, Seeker	
2020	Lee Harvey Osmond	Mohawk	Del Barber, Easy Keeper; Irish Mythen, Little Bones; Catherine MacLellan, Coyote; Justin Rutledge, Passages	
2021	Rose Cousins	Bravado	Leela Gilday, North Star Calling; Tami Neilson, Chickaboom!; William Prince, Reliever; Julian Taylor, The Ridge	
2022	Allison Russell	Outside Child	AHI, Prospect; The Fretless, Open House; Suzie Ungerleider, My Name Is Suzie Ungerleider; Donovan Woods, Without People	
2023	The Bros. Landreth	Come Morning	Blackie and the Rodeo Kings, O Glory; The East Pointers, House of Dreams; Fortunate Ones, That Was You and Me; Shakura S'Aida, Hold On to Love	
2024	William Prince	Stand in the Joy	The Good Lovelies, We Will Never Be the Same; Allison Russell, The Returner; Logan Staats, A Light in the Attic; Julian Taylor, Beyond the Reservoir	
2025	Kaia Kater	Strange Medicine	Boy Golden, For Eden; Abigail Lapell, Anniversary; Julian Taylor, Pathways; Donovan Woods, Things Were Never Good if They're Not Good Now	
2026	Mariel Buckley	Strange Trip Ahead	Matt Andersen, The Hammer and the Rose; Noeline Hofmann, Purple Gas; William Prince, Further from the Country; The Young Novelists, These Dark Canyons	
