= Andrew James O'Brien =

Andrew James O'Brien may refer to:

- Andrew James O'Brien, musician in the Canadian band Fortunate Ones
- Andy O'Brien (footballer)
