= Pharis and Jason Romero =

Canadian folk music duo

- Origin: Horsefly, British Columbia, Canada
- Genres: folk, bluegrass
- Years active: 2007–present
- Members: Pharis Romero; Jason Romero
- Website: Official website

Pharis and Jason Romero are a Canadian folk music duo, most noted as four-time Juno Award winners for Traditional Roots Album of the Year. They won at the 2023 Juno Awards for their album Tell 'Em You Were Gold, at the Juno Awards of 2021 for their album Bet On Love, the Juno Awards of 2016 for their album A Wanderer I'll Stay, and at the Juno Awards of 2018 for Sweet Old Religion.

A husband and wife duo from Horsefly, British Columbia, they write, record and perform folk music. They also build handcrafted banjos under the business name J. Romero Banjos.

== History ==
The pair met at an old-time fiddle jam and later married. They have released five albums as a duo, one with the short-lived project Haints Oldtime String Band, and one collaborative album with guest fiddlers. Their duo records, and live band shows, have included guest musicians John Reischman, Marc Jenkins, Patrick Metzger, Trent Freeman, and others.

Pharis and Jason have performed and taught across Canada, the US and Europe, often touring with their two children. Performance highlights include Celtic Connections in Scotland, two appearances on A Prairie Home Companion, and a tour with Stuart MacLean's The Vinyl Cafe.

Their first record, A Passing Glimpse, won a Canadian Folk Music Award for New/Emerging Artist of the Year at the 8th Canadian Folk Music Awards in 2012.

Long Gone Out West Blues was a shortlisted nominee for Traditional Album of the Year, and Pharis Romero won the award for Traditional Singer of the Year at the 9th Canadian Folk Music Awards in 2013.

A Wanderer I'll Stay was recorded at the couple's banjo workshop, in Horsefly, British Columbia, with engineer David Travers-Smith. At the 11th Canadian Folk Music Awards in 2015 they garnered four nominations for Wanderer, including Traditional Album of the Year, Traditional Singer of the Year, Vocal Group of the Year, and Producer of the Year. They won the Juno Award for Traditional Roots Album of the Year at the 2016 Juno Awards, and Songwriter of the Year at the 2016 Western Canadian Music Awards.

In 2016, the couple's workshop caught fire, destroying the entire banjo business and many of their musical instruments. The workshop was rebuilt, and used as a studio for the recording of their 2018 album, Sweet Old Religion, and 2020 album, Bet On Love. Both combine folk, blues and country.

Sweet Old Religion, released in 2018, received two Canadian Folk Music Awards at the 14th Canadian Folk Music Awards, for Vocal Group and Traditional Singer of the Year, and won the Juno Award for Traditional Roots Album of the Year at the Juno Awards of 2019.

Bet On Love, released in 2020, received three Canadian Folk Music Awards at the 16th Canadian Folk Music Awards, for Vocal Group, Ensemble and Traditional Singer of the Year, and won the Juno Award for Traditional Roots Album of the Year at the Juno Awards of 2021.

Tell 'Em You Were Gold was released in 2022 on Smithsonian Folkways Recordings. The duo's first album where Jason plays only banjos, with Pharis on guitar and guests on fiddle, mandolin, bass, and pedal steel, it won the Traditional Roots Album Juno in 2023.

== Discography ==
- Shout Monah (2009, with Haints Oldtime String Band)
- Back Up and Push (2010, as Jason & Pharis Romero and Friends)
- A Passing Glimpse (2011)
- Long Gone Out West Blues (2013)
- A Wanderer I'll Stay (2015)
- Sweet Old Religion (2018)
- Bet on Love (2020)
- Tell ’em You Were Gold (2022)
