= Mia Kelly =

Canadian singer-songwriter

Mia Kelly is a Canadian folk singer-songwriter from Gatineau, Quebec.

Kelly recorded her debut EP Cardboard Box as a class assignment while in high school, and released it independently in 2018.

Her full-length debut album, Garden Through the War, was released in 2022, and was produced by Jim Bryson. The album included the song "Kitchissippi", written about the hobby of river surfing that she took up during the COVID-19 pandemic. Fluently bilingual, she writes and performs songs in both English and French.

Her second album, To Be Clear, was released in 2024, and was again produced by Bryson.

She followed up in 2026 with Big Time Roller Coaster Feeling.

== Discography ==
- Cardboard Box - 2018
- Garden Through the War - 2022
- To Be Clear - 2024
- Big Time Roller Coaster Feeling - 2026

== Awards ==
Award	Year	Category	Nominee / work	Result	Ref
Canadian Folk Music Awards	2024	New/Emerging Artist of the Year	Garden Through the War	Won	
Canadian Folk Music Awards	2024	Young Performer of the Year	Garden Through the War	Won	
Canadian Folk Music Awards	2025	Single of the Year	"Meaning Well"	Nominated	
Canadian Folk Music Awards	2026	Contemporary Singer of the Year	To Be Clear	Nominated	
Canadian Folk Music Awards	2026	English Songwriter of the Year	To Be Clear	Nominated	
