= Reliever (album) =

Studio album by William Prince
- Released: February 7, 2020
- Recorded: 2019
- Studios: RCA Studio A, Nashville; The Song Shop, Winnipeg
- Genres: Folk, Country, Americana
- Length: 43:38
- Label: Six Shooter Records
- Producers: Dave Cobb, Scott Nolan

William Prince chronology
Earthly Days (2015)	Reliever (2020)	Gospel First Nation (2020)

Reliever is the second studio album from Canadian singer-songwriter William Prince, released on February 7, 2020, on Six Shooter Records.

Prince has described the album as about emotional transitions, encompassing the span between the death of his father prior to the release of his debut album Earthly Days and Prince himself becoming father to his own first child a couple of years later. He has stated that while the songs were written during a difficult period in his life, he "borrowed from his future happiness" to make an album that was more hopeful and optimistic than he was feeling at the time.

The album was recorded at RCA Studio A in Nashville, Tennessee, and in Winnipeg, Manitoba. It was produced by Dave Cobb and Scott Nolan.

== Critical reception ==
Sarah Bea Milner of Exclaim! rated the album 8/10, writing that "Reliever is a happier, more hopeful and optimistic listening journey than Earthly Days. It's casually upbeat — a laidback conversation with an artist who's wise beyond his years. Prince still has stories to tell, but he's switched gears. Previously, the artist found strength in his vulnerability; here, Prince offers himself as an anchor for those feeling rudderless. This is the artist at his most inspirational, thankful and powerful."

== Awards ==
The single "The Spark" was the winner of the 2020 SOCAN Songwriting Prize.

The album was longlisted for the 2020 Polaris Music Prize.

The album was a Juno Award nominee for Contemporary Roots Album of the Year at the Juno Awards of 2021. For the Juno ceremony, which was conducted from a variety of remote locations due to the COVID-19 pandemic in Canada, Prince and Serena Ryder performed "The Spark" at Toronto's Church of the Holy Trinity.

Prince won two Canadian Folk Music Awards at the 16th Canadian Folk Music Awards in 2021, for Contemporary Album of the Year and English Songwriter of the Year. Prince was also nominated for Contemporary Singer of the Year and Solo Artist of the Year.

== Track listing ==
All tracks are written by William Prince.

No.	Title	Length
1.	"The Spark"	3:59
2.	"Wasted"	2:44
3.	"Reliever"	4:13
4.	"Always Have What We Had"	5:10
5.	"Old Souls"	4:13
6.	"That's All I'll Ever Become"	3:37
7.	"Leave It by the Sea"	3:46
8.	"Lighthouse"	3:24
9.	"The Gun"	3:50
10.	"Heaven and Hell"	4:38
11.	"Great Wide Open"	3:59
Total length:		43:38
