= John Alcorn (singer) =

Canadian jazz singer

- Born: Toronto, Ontario, Canada
- Genres: Jazz; Pop Standards
- Occupations: Singer; Pianist; Songwriter
- Instruments: Vocals; Piano
- Years active: 1990–present
- Website: JohnAlcorn.com

John Alcorn is a Canadian jazz singer who is active in the Toronto jazz scene.

== Biography ==
Born in Toronto, Ontario and raised in Trinidad, Nova Scotia, New Brunswick and New Hampshire, Alcorn returned to Toronto as an adult and began performing in jazz clubs. He released his first album in 1999, and was named Male Vocalist of the Year by the Jazz Report Awards. He also earned a Dora Award in 1997 as music director and composer for Theresa Tova's play Still the Night.

Alcorn has also acted in a number of television films, including Must Be Santa and The Piano Man's Daughter.

Alcorn is the partner of puppeteer and dramatist Ronnie Burkett. His daughter, Coco Love Alcorn, is also a noted Canadian jazz and pop singer.

== 2017 ==
In January 2017 John Alcorn began a weekly presentation of his "Songbook Series" at the 120 Diner in downtown Toronto.

== Discography ==
- Haunted (1999)
- Quiet Night (2003)
- Flying Without Wings (2015)
