= Quin with One N =

Canadian fiddler from British Columbia

Quin with One N is the stage name of Quin Etheridge-Pedden, a Canadian fiddler from Lantzville, British Columbia. He is most noted as a two-time Canadian Folk Music Award nominee for Young Performer of the Year, receiving nods at the 13th Canadian Folk Music Awards in 2017 for his album Embark and at the 16th Canadian Folk Music Awards in 2021 for his album Out of the Blue.

He has been a member of the Nanaimo-based string ensemble Fiddelium. Embark, his debut album, was released in 2017 when he was just 15 years old, and was supported in part by a regional tour of Vancouver Island.

Out of the Blue, his first album of entirely original material, was released in 2020.
