= Burnstick =

Canadian folk music group

Burnstick is a Canadian folk music group, consisting of married couple Jason Burnstick and Nadia Gaudet. They are most noted for their albums Dream Big, Little One / Fais de beaux rêves, petit ange (2015), for which they received a Canadian Folk Music Award nomination for Aboriginal Songwriter of the Year at the 12th Canadian Folk Music Awards in 2016, and Kîyânaw (2019), for which they were nominated for Indigenous Songwriter of the Year at the 16th Canadian Folk Music Awards in 2020.

Burnstick is a member of the Plains Cree nation, while Gaudet is of Franco-Manitoban and Métis heritage, and the duo perform music in the English, French and Cree languages.

Prior to launching the duo, Jason Burnstick was active as a solo artist, and received a Juno Award nomination for Aboriginal Recording of the Year at the Juno Awards of 2007.
