= Wyatt C. Louis =

Cree singer-songwriter

Wyatt Chandler Louis, who performs as Wyatt C. Louis, is a Cree singer-songwriter based in Calgary, Alberta, whose debut album Chandler was released in 2024 on Royal Mountain Records.

Louis is queer, and uses they/them pronouns.

== Career ==
After studying music at Red Deer College, Louis began performing on the Calgary music scene. They released their debut single "Dancing with Sue" in 2020. It was promoted as the lead single from a debut album forthcoming later the same year, although the album was not released at that time.

They signed with Royal Mountain Records in 2023, releasing the single "Bobtail Road" to mark Indigenous Peoples' Day. In early 2024, Louis was invited to curate an indigenous music playlist for Spotify, in which they highlighted artists such as William Prince, Julian Taylor, Logan Staats, Sebastian Gaskin, Aysanabee, Anachnid and Snotty Nose Rez Kids.

Chandler, which took its title from Louis's middle name, was released in May 2024. The album was supported with a tour as an opening act for Noah Reid.

Chandler was longlisted for the 2025 Polaris Music Prize, and Erik M. Grice and Vanessa Elizabeth Heins received a Juno Award nomination for Album Artwork of the Year at the Juno Awards of 2025. It was also nominated for Alternative Country Album of the Year at the 2025 Canadian Country Music Association Awards.
