= Earle and Coffin =

Canadian blues and folk music duo

Earle and Coffin were a Canadian blues and folk music duo from Newfoundland and Labrador, consisting of Nick Earle and Joe Coffin. They are most noted as two-time winners of the Canadian Folk Music Award for Young Performer of the Year, winning at the 12th Canadian Folk Music Awards in 2016 for their album Live at the Citadel House and at the 14th Canadian Folk Music Awards in 2018 for their EP A Day in July.

The duo first met at a MusicNL conference in 2013, bonding over their shared interest in blues music. They both performed with the electric blues band Stompbox, and as the acoustic-oriented side project Earle and Coffin.

Live at the Citadel House, their debut album, was released in 2016. They followed up in February 2017 with their second album, Wood Wire Blood & Bone, and in September 2017 with the A Day in July EP.

The duo separated in 2019 with the departure of Joe Coffin.
