= Ten Strings and a Goat Skin =

Canadian folk music group

- Origin: Rustico, Prince Edward Island, Canada
- Genres: Folk music
- Years active: 2010–2018
- Members: Rowen Gallant; Jesse Périard; Caleb Gallant
- Website: none

Ten Strings and a Goat Skin was a Canadian folk music group from Rustico, Prince Edward Island, who performed traditional Celtic and Acadian folk music, in English and French.

The band's members were Rowen Gallant (vocals, fiddle, tenor banjo, and viola), Jesse Périard (guitar, vocals, and pump organ), and Caleb Gallant (bodhran, foot percussion, snare, cajon, vocals, clawhammer banjo).

== History ==
The band was formed when the members were in high school. Rowen and Caleb Gallant are the nephews of folk musician Lennie Gallant.

They released their debut album, TRI, in 2011. The album won the Music PEI Award for Roots Traditional Recording of the Year, and was an East Coast Music Award nominee for Roots and Traditional Group Recording of the Year, in 2012.

In 2013, they followed up with Corbeau. The album won the East Coast Music Award for World Music Recording of the Year, and received a Canadian Folk Music Award nomination for Young Performer of the Year at the 9th Canadian Folk Music Awards.

Their third album, Auprès du poêle, was released in 2016. The album won the East Coast Music Award for Roots/Traditional Recording of the Year, received several Canadian Folk Music Award nominations at the 12th Canadian Folk Music Awards including Traditional Album of the Year, Traditional Singer of the Year (Rowen Gallant) and Pushing the Boundaries, and was a Juno Award nominee for Traditional Roots Album of the Year at the Juno Awards of 2017.

They toured extensively throughout their career, including performances in Canada, the United States, Europe and Australia. In 2018, they announced that following tour dates in Australia and Louisiana, the band would be going on hiatus.

== Recordings ==
- 2011 – TRI
- 2013 – Corbeau
- 2016 – Auprès du poêle
