= Earthly Days =

Studio album by William Prince
- Released: December 11, 2015
- Genres: Folk, country, Americana
- Length: 45:06
- Producer: Scott Nolan

William Prince chronology
Earthly Days (2015)	Reliever (2020)

Earthly Days is the debut album from the Canadian singer-songwriter William Prince, released December 11, 2015. The album was originally released independently, before receiving wider commercial rerelease in 2018 on Glassnote Records in the United States and Six Shooter Records in Canada.

Prince has said that the album took ten years to make. According to him, "I was trying to put out a record since I was about 20 years old, and it wasn't until I was 29 that it actually happened. I ran into a lot of a lot of things on the way, personally and financially; the things that stop you from wanting to put your art out. You name it, it was there. I worked with a bad producer in the beginning who took all my money, and it ended with my father passing away six months before the record was supposed to come out. I believe in everything happening at the right time. I think all that suffering and wondering would have been for nothing if I didn't put out a record. If you don't put anything out how do you know you're getting any better, or growing, or changing, or evolving in any way? I got the money together and I was able to finally record some songs in Winnipeg."

The album was produced by Scott Nolan, and includes contributions from Lynn Miles. The 2018 reissue featured a new rerecording of "Breathless" produced by Dave Cobb, which reached #22 on the Billboard Adult Contemporary charts in 2018.

== Critical reception ==
Michael Elves of The Manitoban praised the album, writing that "on this, his debut record, Prince demonstrates why some of the city’s best roots musicians are admirers and cements his place among them. Consider album opener 'You Got Me' – it somehow deftly avoids the ‘we’ve got each other and that’s enough’ trope while still being essentially about that. Certainly, the honeyed voice singing the tune helps – Prince's supple baritone feels like it could keep you warm on a Manitoba winter's night – and the foot-stomp percussion provides an insistent push to the tune."

John Kendle of the Winnipeg Free Press wrote that "while the record kicks off with a jig, its inclusion seems like an homage to Prince's musical heritage. The real heart of Earthly Days is in storytelling tunes such as The Carny, Breathless and Eddy Boy -- songs in which Prince runs his measured eye and rich baritone over life's shortcomings yet still finds warmth and hope. Indeed, there's a real gospel tone to several of these songs, especially the title track and album-closer Grace."

== Awards ==
Prince won the Western Canadian Music Award for Aboriginal Artist of the Year in 2016.

He received Canadian Folk Music Award nominations for Contemporary Singer of the Year and Aboriginal Songwriter of the Year at the 12th Canadian Folk Music Awards.

Prince won the Juno Award for Contemporary Roots Album of the Year at the Juno Awards of 2017, and was a finalist for Indigenous Music Album of the Year.

== Track listing ==
All tracks are written by William Prince.

No.	Title	Length
1.	"You Got Me"	3:33
2.	"Little Things"	4:19
3.	"The Carny"	3:20
4.	"Breathless"	4:09
5.	"Eddy Boy"	4:28
6.	"Mama"	3:17
7.	"Earthly Days"	4:19
8.	"Bloom"	3:56
9.	"The Bodyguard and the Beer Girl"	4:13
10.	"All I Know"	4:25
11.	"Grace"	5:00
Total length:		45:06
