= Stand in the Joy =

Studio album by William Prince
- Released: April 14, 2023
- Studio: Low Country South
- Genres: Folk, country, Americana
- Length: 35:30
- Label: Six Shooter Records
- Producer: Dave Cobb

William Prince chronology
Gospel First Nation (2020)	Stand in the Joy (2023)

Stand in the Joy is the fourth album from the Canadian singer-songwriter William Prince. The album was produced by Dave Cobb and recorded at Cobb's studio in Savannah, Georgia, in May 2022 and released by Six Shooter Records.

The album was described by Prince as a declaration of "love, peace and strength" and a departure from the singer's more solemn previous albums.

The album was preceded in February 2023 by Prince performing at the Grand Ole Opry in Nashville, Tennessee, his first time playing the legendary venue.

== Music and composition ==
William Prince is listed as the sole songwriter for the entire album, in keeping with his previous albums.

In an interview with Nashville's WSMV-TV, Prince said the album was an "opportunity" to explore joy. "It’s just about acknowledging the good in your life, the people that bring that good, the love that surrounds you, and standing in what you have rather than sitting in what we may have lost over time," Prince said.

== Critical reception ==
The album was received positively, with a high album review score from Exclaim! AP News complimented Prince's "disarmingly warm, gentle delivery" and Folk Alley said that the new songs "refresh, restore, and rejuvenate."

The album won the Juno Award for Contemporary Roots Album of the Year at the Juno Awards of 2024, and Prince was nominated for Songwriter of the Year for the songs "Broken Heart of Mine", "Easier and Harder" and "When You Miss Someone".

At the 19th Canadian Folk Music Awards, Prince won Solo Artist of the Year and the album won Contemporary Album of the Year. The album was nominated for Alternative Country Album of the Year at the 2024 Canadian Country Music Awards.

== Track listing ==
1. When You Miss Someone
2. Only Thing We Need
3. Tanqueray
4. Young
5. Broken Heart of Mine
6. Pasadena
7. Goldie Hawn
8. Easier and Harder
9. Peace of Mind
10. Take a Look Around
