= Durham County Poets =

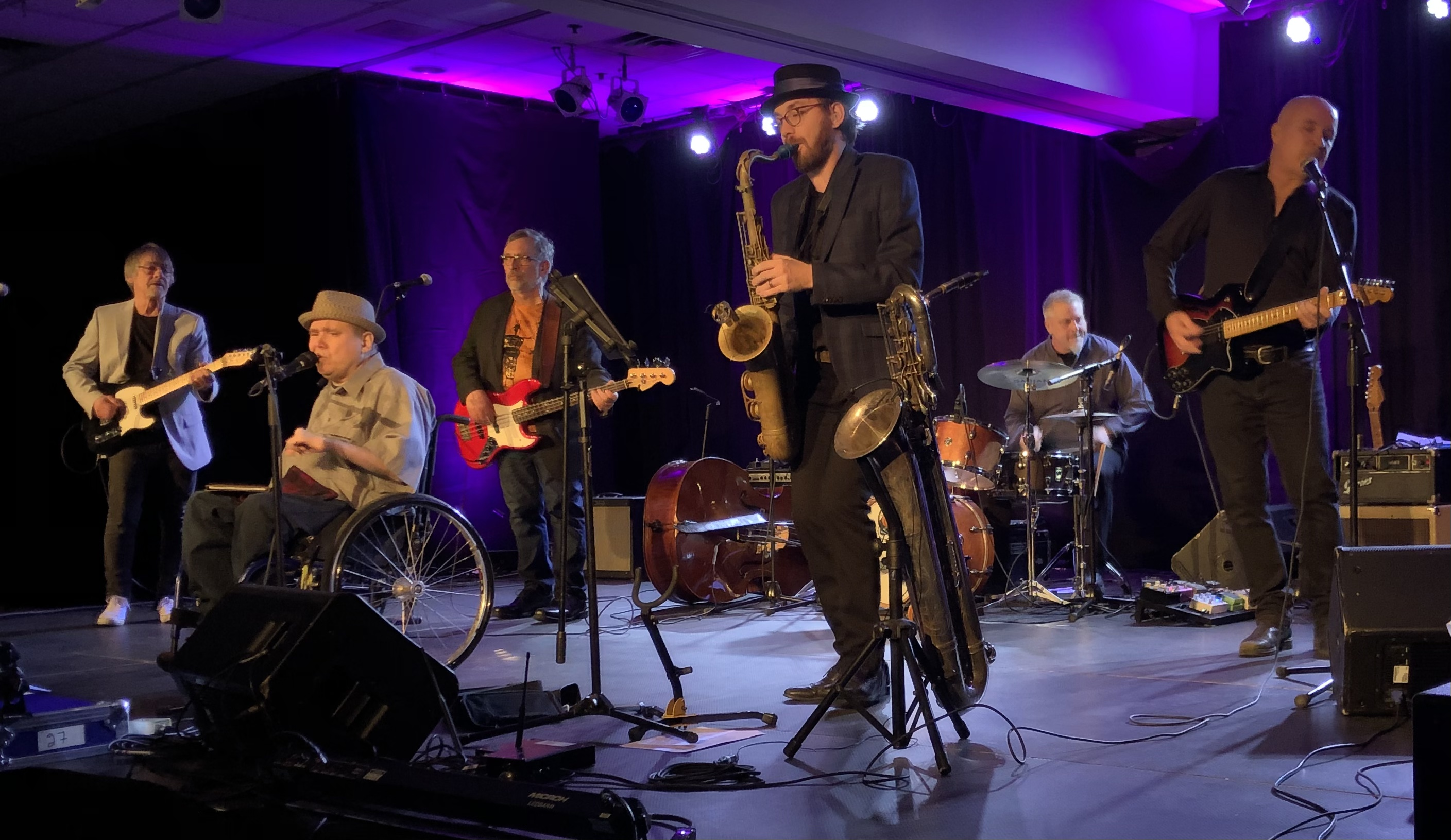
- Durham County Poets performing 2022

Background information
- Genres: Blues

Durham County Poets are a Canadian blues band from Ormstown, Quebec. They are most noted for their 2019 album Hand Me Down Blues, which was a Juno Award nominee for Blues Album of the Year at the Juno Awards of 2020.

The band consists of singer Kevin Harvey, guitarists David Whyte and Neil Elsmore, double bassist Carl Rufh and drummer Rob Couture.

In addition to the Juno Award nomination, Harvey also received a Canadian Folk Music Award nomination for Traditional Singer of the Year at the 16th Canadian Folk Music Awards for Hand Me Down Blues.

== Discography ==
- Where the River Flows (2012)
- Chikkaboodah Stew (2014)
- Grimshaw Road (2017)
- Hand Me Down Blues (2019)
- Out of the Woods (2022)
