= 11th Canadian Folk Music Awards =

2015 music awards ceremony

- Date: November 8, 2015
- Location: Citadel Theatre, Edmonton, Alberta
- Country: Canada
- Website: folkawards.ca

The 11th Canadian Folk Music Awards were presented in Edmonton, Alberta on November 8, 2015.

== Nominees and recipients ==
Recipients are listed first and highlighted in boldface.

Traditional Album	Contemporary Album
**Matthew Byrne, Hearts & Heroes**; Le Vent du Nord, Têtu; Natalie MacMaster and Donnell Leahy, One; Pharis and Jason Romero, A Wanderer I'll Stay; Jayme Stone, Jayme Stone's Lomax Project	**Catherine MacLellan, The Raven's Sun**; Jon Brooks, The Smiling and Beautiful Countryside; Jenn Grant, Compostela; The Once, Departures; Gabrielle Papillon, The Tempest of Old
Children's Album	Traditional Singer
**The Swinging Belles, More Sheep, Less Sleep**; Ginalina, Forest Friends' Nature Club Album; Henri Godon, La vie rêvée!; Hilary Grist, Tomorrow Is a Chance to Start Over; Stella Swanson, I'm Not a Bunny	**Michael Jerome Browne, Sliding Delta**; Matthew Byrne, Hearts & Heroes; Tamar Ilana, Arrelumbre (Ventanas); Annie Lou, Tried and True; Pharis Romero, A Wanderer I'll Stay (Pharis and Jason Romero)
Contemporary Singer	Instrumental Solo Artist
**Amelia Curran, They Promised You Mercy**; Peter Katz, We Are the Reckoning; Sarah MacDougall, Grand Canyon; Catherine MacLellan, The Raven's Sun; Jory Nash, The Many Hats of Jory Nash	**Adrianna Ciccone, The Back of Winter**; Jean-François Bélanger, Les vents orfèvres; Nick Hornbuckle, 12x2(+/-1); Patti Kusturok, Milestone; Wendy MacIsaac, Off the Floor
Instrumental Group	English Songwriter
**Natalie MacMaster and Donnell Leahy, One**; Coastline, Coastline; Shane Cook and Jake Charron, Head to Head; Lemon Bucket Orkestra, Moorka; Monsoon, Mandala	**Amelia Curran, They Promised You Mercy**; Catherine Allan and Andrew James O'Brien (Fortunate Ones), The Bliss; Jon Brooks, The Smiling and Beautiful Countryside; Luke Doucet and Melissa McClelland (Whitehorse), Leave No Bridge Unburned; Jenn Grant, Compostela
French Songwriter	Aboriginal Songwriter
**Louis-Jean Cormier, Les grandes artères**; Jocelyne Baribeau, Entre toi et moi; Benoit Pinette (Tire le coyote), Panorama; Dany Placard, Santa Maria; Geneviève Toupin, Willows	**Raven Kanatakta and ShoShona Kish (Digging Roots), For the Light**; Miranda Currie, Up in the Air; The Jerry Cans, Aakuluk; Buffy Sainte-Marie, Power in the Blood; Laura Vinson and Free Spirit, Warrior
Vocal Group	Ensemble
**Fortunate Ones, The Bliss**; The Good Lovelies, Burn the Plan; The Lucky Sisters, So Lucky; Pharis and Jason Romero, A Wanderer I'll Stay; The Young Novelists, Made Us Strangers	**Big Little Lions, A Little Frayed, a Little Torn**; The Once, Departures; Jayme Stone, Jayme Stone's Lomax Project; The Sweet Lowdown, Chasing the Sun; Whitehorse, Leave No Bridge Unburned
Solo Artist	World Solo Artist
**Catherine MacLellan, The Raven's Sun**; Michael Jerome Browne, Sliding Delta; Amelia Curran, They Promised You Mercy; Lizzy Hoyt, New Lady on the Prairie; Oh Susanna, Namedropper	**Kiran Ahluwalia, Sanata: Stillness**; Jean-François Bélanger, Les vents orfèvres; Elage, Diame; Emmanuel Jal, The Key; Wagner Petrilli, Confissão
World Group	New/Emerging Artist
**Lemon Bucket Orkestra, Moorka**; Ayrad, Ayrad; Alex Cuba, Healer; Monsoon, Mandala; Ventanas, Arrelumbre	**The Young Novelists, Made Us Strangers**; Crooked Brothers, Thank You I'm Sorry; Fortunate Ones, The Bliss; The Harpoonist and the Axe Murderer, A Real Fine Mess; The River and the Road, Headlights
Producer	Pushing the Boundaries
**Daniel Ledwell, Compostela (Jenn Grant)**; Jory Nash and Chris Stringer, The Many Hats of Jory Nash; Les Cooper, Burn the Plan (The Good Lovelies); Murray Pulver, Dave Zeglinski and Steve Bell, Pilgrimage (Steve Bell); Pharis Romero, Jason Romero and David Travers-Smith, A Wanderer I'll Stay (Pharis and Jason Romero)	**Kevin Breit, Ernesto and Delilah**; The Jerry Cans, Aakuluk; The Shoeless, The Shoeless; Dana Sipos, Roll Up the Night Sky; Whitehorse, Leave No Bridge Unburned
Young Performer	
**Rebecca Lappa, Tattered Rose**; Robbie Bankes, Through February Snow; Coastline, Coastline; Mira Meikle, Mira; Benjamin Dakota Rogers, Strong Man's Address to the Circus Crowd	
