= The Wilderness of Manitoba =

Canadian indie folk band

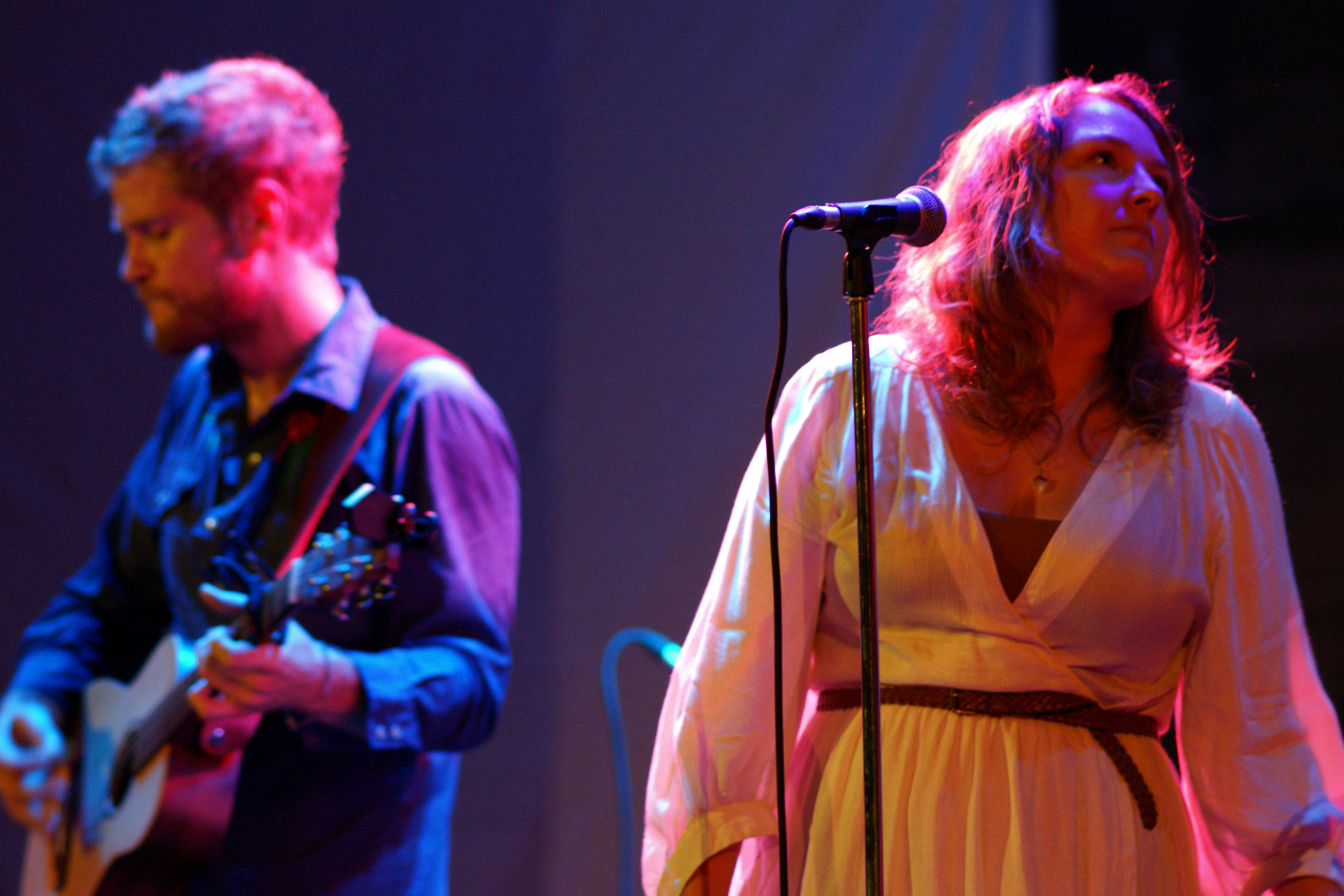
- The Wilderness of Manitoba, August 2011

Background information
- Origin: Toronto, Ontario, Canada
- Genres: Folk, Rock
- Years active: 2009–present
- Members: Will Whitwham; Raven Shields; Tavo Diez de Bonilla.

The Wilderness of Manitoba are a Canadian indie folk band who formed in 2009 in Toronto. They have released five albums.

The band's membership has changed multiple times, and has shifted from a quintet to a quartet. The constant member has been lead vocalist, guitarist and keyboardist Will Whitwham. Current recording and touring members of the band include Victoria Carr (vocals/guitar), Tavo Diez de Bonilla (bass/vocals). In 2018, drummer and vocalist Mike Brushey was succeeded by Adam Balsam who died on the October 29, 2021 release date of Farewell To Cathedral.

Alex Lifeson from the band Rush is a guest guitarist on the track "Shift" from the album Between Colours.

== Discography ==
- 2009: Hymns of Love & Spirits (re-issued in 2011)
- 2010: When You Left the Fire
- 2012: DelawareHouse (EP)
- 2012: Island of Echoes
- 2013: The Leslieville Sessions (EP)
- 2014: Between Colours
- 2017: Across the Dark
- 2018: The Tin Shop (EP)
- 2021: Farewell To Cathedral
