= 16th Canadian Folk Music Awards =

2021 music awards ceremony

- Country: Canada
- Website: folkawards.ca

The 16th Canadian Folk Music Awards were presented on April 9 and 10, 2021, to honour achievements in folk music by Canadian artists in 2020. Due to the ongoing COVID-19 pandemic in Canada, the awards were presented in a virtual livestream rather than a physical gala.

Nominations were announced December 1, 2020.

== Nominees and recipients ==
Recipients are listed first and highlighted in boldface.

Traditional Album	Contemporary Album
**Beòlach, All Hands**; Bruce Cockburn, Crowing Ignites; Le Diable à Cinq, Debout!; Ian and Sylvia, The Lost Tapes; Pharis and Jason Romero, Bet on Love	**William Prince, Reliever**; Basia Bulat, Are You in Love?; The Dead South, Sugar & Joy; The East Pointers, Yours to Break; Stephen Fearing, The Unconquerable Past; Catherine MacLellan, Coyote; Mike McKenna Jr., At the Edge of the World; Joe Nolan, Drifters
Children's Album	Traditional Singer
**Claire Ness, Broccoli Farm**; Spencer Burton, The Mountain Man; Ginalina, Small But Mighty; Henri Godon, Tous musiciens; Charlie Hope, Goodnight to You All	**Pharis Romero, Bet on Love**; Mike Bravener, Depends Upon the Pay; Kevin Harvey, Hand Me Down Blues; Mark Manning, The Thing About Fish; Lou Natale, Workin' the Mystery
Contemporary Singer	Instrumental Solo Artist
**Coco Love Alcorn, Rebirth**; Basia Bulat, Are You in Love?; Tim Chaisson, Yours to Break (The East Pointers); Catherine MacLellan, Coyote; William Prince, Reliever	**Marc Atkinson, Solo**; Benjamin Barrile, Esperando el Alba; Gordon Grdina, Prior Street; Nick Hornbuckle, 13 or So; Natalie MacMaster, Sketches
Instrumental Group	English Songwriter
**Beòlach, All Hands**; Emilyn Stam and John David Williams, Honeywood; Gordon Grdina's The Marrow, Safar-E-Daroon; Jessica Deutsch and Ozere, Traces; Rhizome, Double capture	**William Prince, Reliever**; Coco Love Alcorn, Rebirth; Basia Bulat, Are You in Love?; Pharis and Jason Romero, Bet on Love; Sarah Jane Scouten, Confessions; Julian Taylor, The Ridge
French Songwriter	Indigenous Songwriter
**Marie-Ève Lapierre-Lemoyne, Onze**; Guillaume Arsenault, La partie de moi qui tremble; Raphaël Delahaye, Le sens de la dérive; Flavie Léger-Roy, Ce chapeau est trop grand pour moi; Alexandre Poulin, Nature humaine	**Leela Gilday, North Star Calling**; Jason and Nadia Burnstick, Kîyânaw; A. W. Cardinal, Bare Knuckles & Brawn; Riit, ataataga; Crystal Shawanda, Church House Blues
Vocal Group	Ensemble
**Pharis and Jason Romero, Bet on Love**; The Barrel Boys, Mainline; Beauséjour, Beauséjour; Big Little Lions, Inside Voice; Kennedy Road, A Little Fight Left Yet	**Pharis and Jason Romero, Bet on Love**; OKAN, Sombras; Sultans of String, Refuge; Sussex, The Ocean Wide; The Dead South, Sugar & Joy
Solo Artist	World Album
**Julian Taylor, The Ridge**; Catherine MacLellan, Coyote; Lynn Miles, We'll Look For Stars; William Prince, Reliever; Riit, ataataga	**Zal Sissokho, Kora flamenca**; Aviva Chernick, La Serena; Okavango African Orchestra, Africa Without Borders; Mazacote, Patria; OKAN, Sombras
Single of the Year	New/Emerging Artist
**Burnstick, "Some Kind of Hell"**; Craig Cardiff, "Yellowknife"; The East Pointers, "Wintergreen"; Leela Gilday, "K'eintah Natse Ju"; William Prince, "The Spark"	**Noah Derksen, America, Dreaming**; Marie-Ève Laure, Onze; Maya Rae, Can You See Me?; Emily Rockarts, Little Flower; Rum Ragged, The Thing About Fish; Emily Triggs, Middletown
Producer	Pushing the Boundaries
**Chris McKhool and John "Beetle" Bailey, Refuge (Sultans of String)**; Dave Clarke and Bill Garrett, Coming Home (Steel Rail); Roy Forbes, Edge of Blue (Roy Forbes); Marc Jenkins, Bet on Love (Pharis and Jason Romero); Dayna Manning, Morning Light (Dayna Manning)	**Aerialists, Dear Sienna**; The East Pointers, Yours to Break; The Henrys, Paydirt; Mélisande (électrotrad), Les myriades; Riit, ataataga
Young Performer
**The Gilberts, The Gilberts: One**; Moscow Apartment, Better Daughter; Paige Penney, Watch Out for Your Step; Quin with One N, Out of the Blue; Maya Rae, Can You See Me?
