= The Young Novelists =

- Origin: Toronto, Ontario, Canada
- Genres: Folk, Roots
- Years active: 2009–present
- Members: Graydon James; Laura Spink
- Past members: Noel DiTosto; Alex Dodd; Shawn Jurek; John Law; Myke Mazzei; Michael Paddags
- Website: theyoungnovelists.com

The Young Novelists are a Canadian folk-roots band, formed in Toronto, Ontario in August 2009. They play and tour as a five or six-piece band, or as a duo. Their second full-length studio album, made us strangers, was released in April 2015 and won the Canadian Folk Music Award for New/Emerging Artist, as well as being nominated for the Canadian Folk Music Award for Vocal Group. It remained nine weeks on the Top 10 Folk/Roots/Blues !earshot radio charts in Canada.

The Young Novelists received the award for New/Emerging Artist of the Year at the 11th Canadian Folk Music Awards. They were also the winners of the 2015 Grassy Hills Songwriting competition at the Connecticut Folk Festival. Songwriter Graydon James also received the 2015 Colleen Peterson Songwriting Award, presented by the Ontario Arts Council. Previously, they were the 2010 recipients of the Galaxie (now called Stingray Music) Rising Star award.

Festival appearances include Mariposa Folk Festival, Summerfolk, and Falcon Ridge Folk Festival.

Their song “It Takes All Kinds” has been described as being "[for] fans of Blue Rodeo, The Band, and pre-weirdness Wilco".

== Discography ==
- a small town eulogy, (April 2011)
- live at dublin st. church, (November 2011)
- in the year you were born, (September 2012)
- made us strangers, (April 2015)
- in city & country, (May 2018)
- these dark canyons, (October 2025)
