= Corin Raymond =

Canadian singer-songwriter

Corin Sean Hillier Raymond (DOB November 23, 1972) is a Canadian folk rock and alternative country singer-songwriter. He is most noted for receiving a Juno Award nomination for Contemporary Roots Album of the Year for his album Hobo Jungle Fever Dreams at the Juno Awards of 2017.

Raymond was originally a member of the duo The Undesirables alongside Sean Cotton, with whom he released a number of albums in the 1990s and 2000s. He released his solo debut Record Lonesome Night in 2004, and followed up with There Will Always Be a Small Time in 2009.

In 2012 Raymond announced a fundraising campaign to have his forthcoming album Paper Nickels funded by audience and fan donations of Canadian Tire money. The campaign was inspired by the fact that fans had started spontaneously giving him Canadian Tire money at live shows, after he mentioned it in the lyrics to his song "Don't Spend It Honey". The album was released in 2013.

Hobo Jungle Fever Dreams, his fourth album, was released in 2016. In addition to his Juno Award nomination, he received a Canadian Folk Music Award nomination for Contemporary Album of the Year, and David Gillis won the CFMA for Producer of the Year for his work on the album, at the 12th Canadian Folk Music Awards. His fifth album Dirty Mansions was released in 2019.
