= Megan Bonnell =

- Born: Caledon, Ontario, Canada
- Genres: Folk
- Instruments: Guitar; Piano; Vocals
- Website: meganbonnellmusic.com

Megan Bonnell is a Canadian folk musician.

== Early life ==
Bonnell was born in Caledon, Ontario Between the ages of four and twelve, she taught herself to play piano by ear. Bonnell attended Mayfield Secondary School, where she studied voice. She performed her first gig as part of "Caledon Idol" at the Caledon Inn. In her late teens, Bonnell moved to Toronto. She later pursued a degree in English and political science at the University of Toronto.

== Career ==
Before graduating high school, Bonnel formed the indie-pop band, Reily, with friends. While in university, Bonnel toured Canada with the band.

Bonnell's first full-length solo album, Hunt and Chase, was released by Toronto's Nevado Records in 2013. It was produced by Chris Stringer and Joshua Van Tassel, whom Bonnell met while working as a barista at Ella's Uncle Café in Toronto. She released Magnolia on April 15, 2016, with Cadence Music. In 2016, she toured Canada as a supporting act for the Great Lake Swimmers. She toured with them again in 2018. Bonnell's third album, Separate Rooms, was released on April 6, 2018. The lead single and title track of Separate Rooms, which was co-written with Donovan Wood, reached number one on the CBC Music Top 20. The single "Your Voice" reached number 4 on the list. As part of the 2019 Juno Awards' Juno's 365, Bonnell covered Blue Rodeo's "Try".

== Discography ==
- Maps (EP)
- Hunt and Chase (2013)
- Magnolia (2016)
- Separate Rooms (2018)

== Awards and nominations ==
Year	Award	Category	Result	Notes	Ref.
2016	Canadian Folk Music Awards	Solo Artist	Nominated	for Magnolia	
2016	Canadian Folk Music Awards	Contemporary Singer	Nominated	for Magnolia	
2018	SOCAN No. 1 Song Award	n/a	Won	for "Separate Rooms"	
