= Kazdoura =

- Origin: Toronto, Canada
- Genres: Arabic music; Psychedelic; Funk; Soul
- Years active: 2020–present
- Label: August 4th Records
- Website: www.kazdouramusic.com

Kazdoura is a Canada-based band that bridges modern and traditional Arabic music with elements of psychedelia, funk and soul. The band was founded in Toronto by Syrian vocalist Leen Hamo and Lebanese multi-instrumentalist John Abou Chacra in 2020. The name Kazdoura means “a short, spontaneous trip” or simply ”to stroll or walk” in Levantine Arabic.

Hamo left her hometown of Aleppo in 2014 during the Syrian civil war and spend two years as refugee in Turkey before settling in Canada. She cites taarab, classical Arabic and Egyptian music as influences, particularly Rima Khcheich, Ziad Rahbani and Oum Kulthum.

Chacra grew up in Kuwait and was more strongly influenced by rock, jazz and funk. He has described his approach to arranging music as being naturally shaped by Western genres. He first met Hamo at a fundraiser in Toronto following the 2020 Beirut explosion.

Their music has been described as "[...] drawing from Levantine maqams and classical Arabic phrasing while weaving in jazz improvisation, funk rhythm, disco sparkle and electro-pop detail."

== Awards ==
In 2025, the song “Khayal“ won the Folk Music Ontario Award (FMO) for Best Music Video. In 2026, Kazdoura received the Canadian Folk Music Award "Global Roots Album of the Year". The same year, they won the Juno Award for Global Music Album of the Year. Both for the album Ghoyoum.

== Discography ==
=== Albums ===
- Wain, EP (2022)
- Ghoyoum (2025)

=== Singles ===
- Wain (2022)
- 7issar (2024)
- Gulli MetaShoofak (2024)
- Mili (2024)
- Marhaba Ahlen (2024)
- Khayal (2024)
- Bala Wda3 (2025)
- and then? (2025)
- Taa (2026)
