= Fiddelium =

Musical group from British Columbia

- Origin: Nanaimo, BC, Canada
- Genres: Contemporary folk; International folk
- Instruments: violin, viola, cello, guitar, piano, bass
- Years active: 2011–present
- Members: 18
- Past members: Quin Etheridge-Pedden

Fiddelium (/fɪˈdɛli.əm/) is a youth fiddle group from Nanaimo, British Columbia, founded in 2011. There are two tiers in the group; senior and junior. The senior group consists of 14 members between the ages of 12 and 18, and an accompanist who acts as co-director alongside the director. The junior group is made up of 3 members who play with the senior group on certain songs. The group as a whole is primarily composed of violin players, with three viola players (one member plays both violin and viola) and one or two cello players. In some recordings, there are other folk instruments featured including the pennywhistle, concertina, and nyckelharpa. The accompanist plays piano and guitar and the director occasionally plays the double bass. As of September 2024, Fiddelium was joined by a new guitar accompanist and a drummer. The group was founded by director Trish Horrocks and accompanist Geoff Horrocks, wife and husband. The group has released four albums, Fiddelium, Lit Up, Bloom, and Tenuto. The former won a Canadian Folk Music Award in 2023 in the Young Performers of the Year category, and Bloom was nominated for the same in the 2024 awards. The group has also won two CBC Music Class Challenges in 2020 and 2021, respectively.

The membership of Fiddelium has changed over the years, with members often leaving the group after graduating from high-school, and various younger members replacing them. Some years there is a junior program and other years all members are senior. Junior players often graduate to the senior group after one year as a junior.

== See also ==
- Quin with One N
- 18th Canadian Folk Music Awards
- West Coast Youth Fiddle Summit
