= James Culleton =

- Education: University of Manitoba
- Known for: blind-contour drawing and sculpture
- Website: http://jamesculleton.com

James Culleton is a Canadian contemporary multimedia artist and designer based in Saint Boniface, a city ward of Winnipeg, Manitoba. He specializes in blind-contour drawing and sculpture, and his work has been exhibited across Canada and into the United States.

== Education ==
Culleton received a BFA (Honours) from the University of Manitoba in 1997. His teachers included Diana Thorneycroft and Diane Whitehouse, among others.

== Work ==
Culleton produces mural art, oils and acrylics on canvas, blind contour drawings in ink and watercolor, as well as steel sculpture and multi-media installations. As a furniture designer, Culleton has created large furniture pieces for Lazyboy, American Leather, Palliser Furniture, Jaymar, EQ3, and The Pinnacle Seating Studio.. He has also recorded twelve albums as a roots-based singer-songwriter, released two volumes of themed line drawings, and is active as a public speaker, writer, and teacher.

=== Projects ===
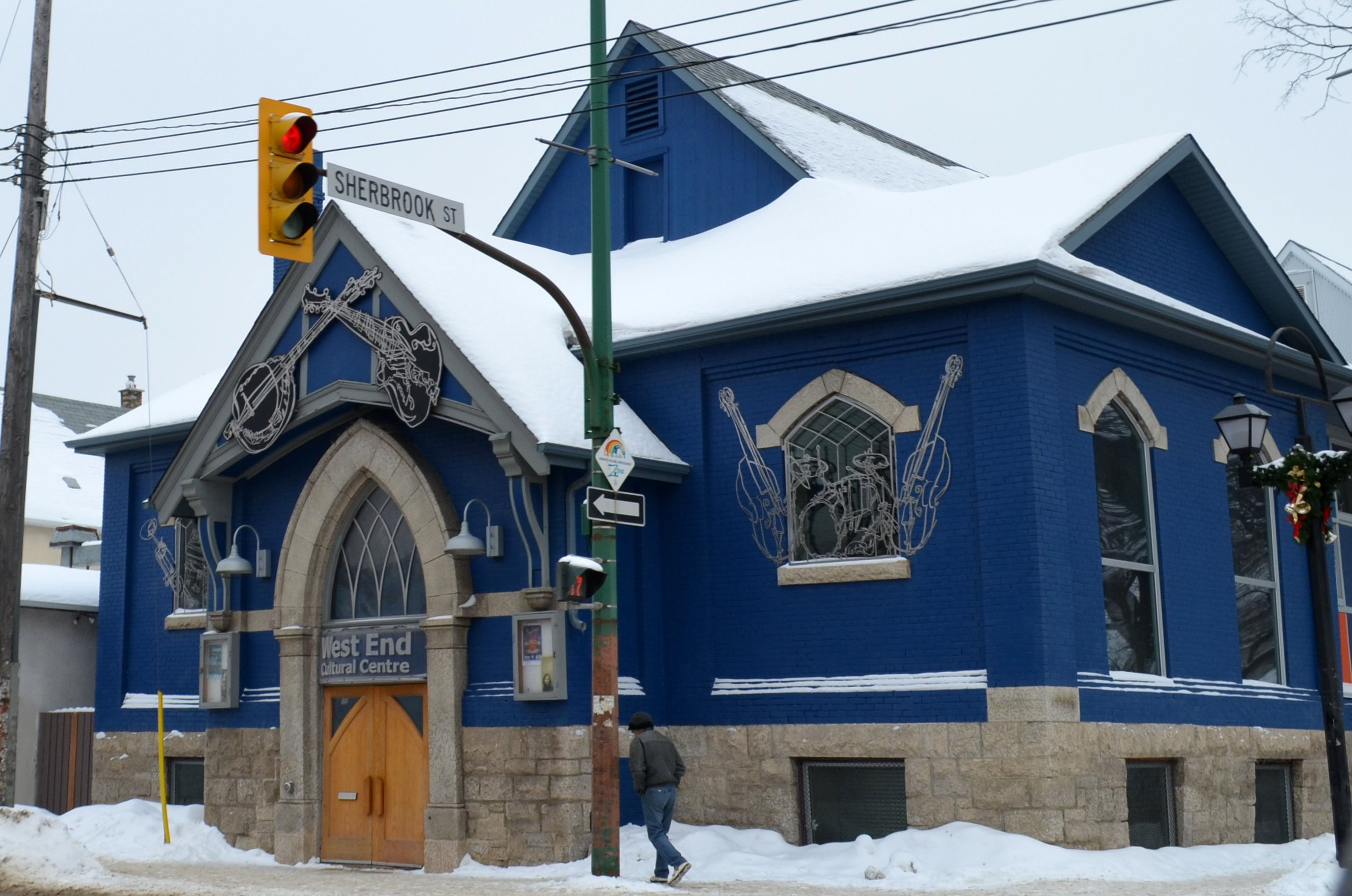
facade of West End Cultural Centre, showing Culleton's water-jet steel musical instrument sculptures

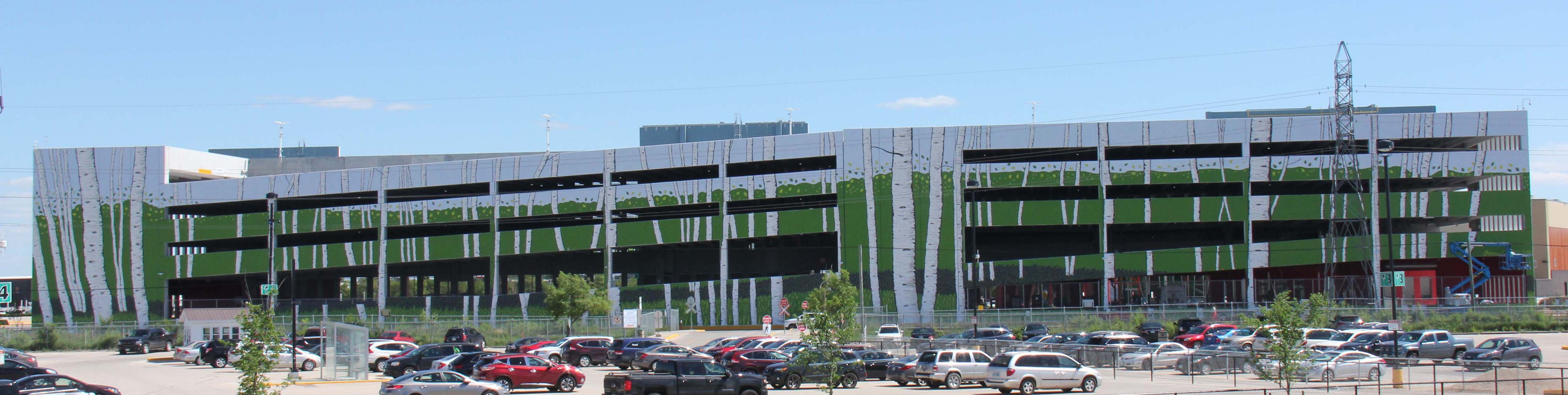
Birch tree mural, Club Regent Casino, Winnipeg, MB

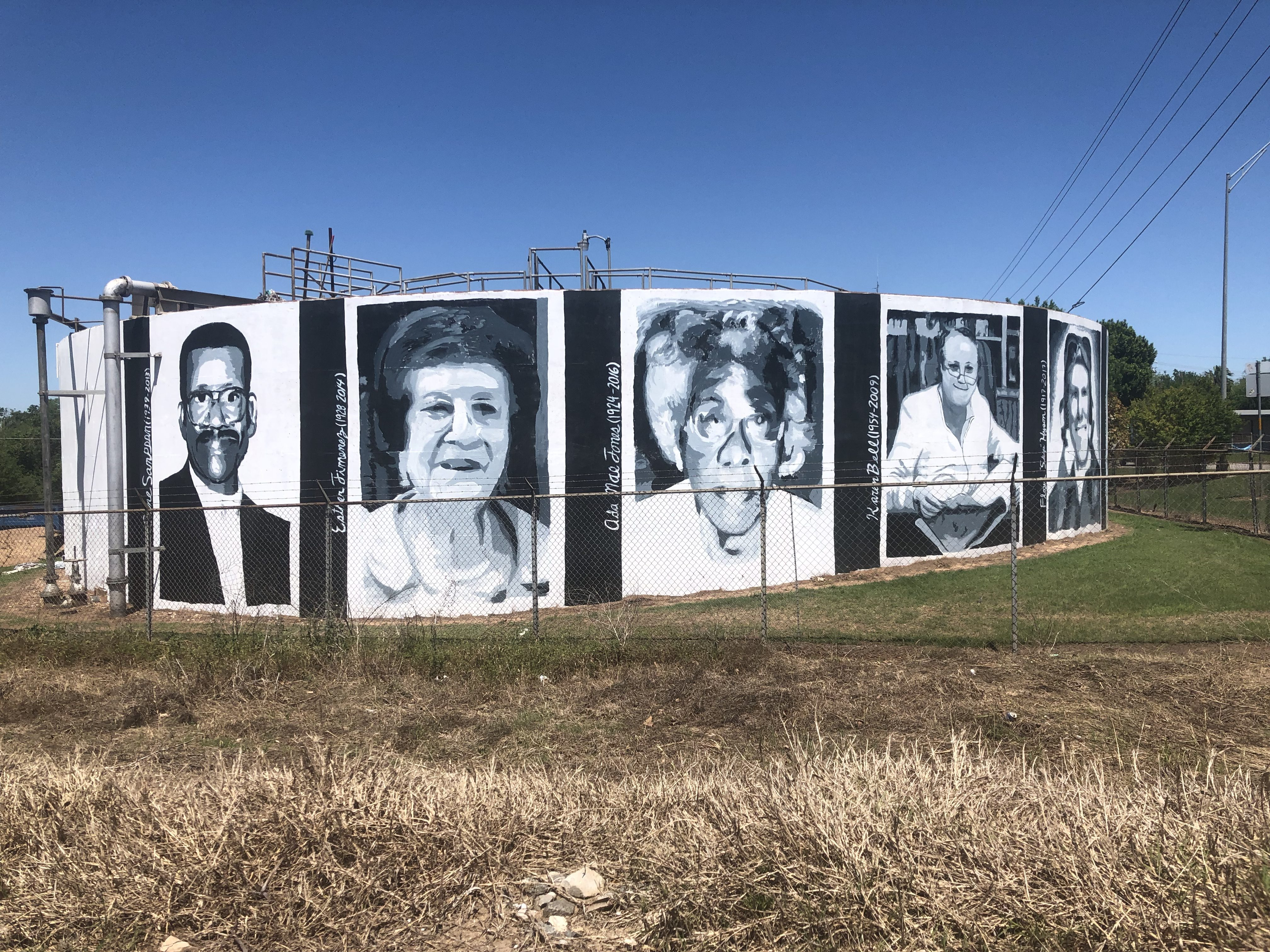
Smithville Legacy Portraits, Smithville, TX

- West End Cultural Centre facade: Large-scale steel sculptures of musical instruments featured on the facade of the West End Cultural Centre in Winnipeg, a commission completed in 2010.
- Winnipeg Folk Festival Labyrinths: Mowed grass labyrinths on the grounds of the Winnipeg Folk Festival in Bird's Hill Park, MB, produced annually since 2007.
- McCanna House Residency Project: Multimedia exhibit at the North Dakota Museum of Art that included drawings, paintings, photos, a nine-track album featuring music and performances by the artist, and a series of music videos starring Uncle Charlie, a life-sized puppet produced through collaboration with puppeteer Curtis Wiebe. Grand Forks, ND. 2015.
- Crokicurl: painted ice installation combining the sport of curling with the board game crokinole, at The Forks, Winnipeg, MB. Feb. 2017.
- Canada Day Viking Ship: floating barge of recycled materials and animated LED light, built in partnership with Gimli High School for Canada 150 celebrations. Gimli, MB. July 2017.
- Tiny House on the Prairie Art Residency: Kelwood, MB. Aug. 2017.
- Aviary 3.0: sound and sculpture installation of wooden birds paired with motion sensor-activated bird calls, one of six winners in the Art Gallery of Southwestern Manitoba's 2018 Winter Garden project. Brandon, MB. 2018. Another version of this installation, Aviary 4.0, created by Culleton and artist Michael Koch-Schulte using electro-luminescent birds and sound houses focused on crow and raven calls, was included at the North Dakota Museum of Art's bi-annual auction. Grand Forks, ND. Feb. 2018.
- Snowplaces: snow-sculptured winter living room installations featuring "snofas," log end tables, and other furnishings constructed to evoke the idea of home in the outdoors. Created as part of Riding Mountain National Park's Winter Adventure Weekend. Wasagaming, MB. Feb. 2018.

Birch Tree Mural: birch tree forest-inspired mural on north-facing side of Club Regent Casino. At 60 feet (18 m) tall and 500 feet (150 m) wide, the mural is the largest in Manitoba. Winnipeg, MB. July 2018.

- Smithville Legacy Portraits: large-scale mural of historical community leaders. A commission from the City of Smithville upon receipt of a grant from the National Endowment for the Arts. Smithville, TX. Nov. 2018. Part II of this project was completed in Apr. 2019, via a grant from the Texas Commission on the Arts.
- conFluENCE, with Michael Koch-Schulte: water-jet cut steel fence with internal lighting. On-site installation at Hargrave Place, Winnipeg, MB. Dec. 2018.
- There's Snowplace Like Home, with Chris Pancoe and Jakobi Heinrichs: snow sculptures highlighting selected species at risk within Riding Mountain National Park. Wasagaming, MB. Feb. 2019.
- Sun Spectrums: rainbow-themed mural commissioned by Brandon Downtown Development Corporation, Brandon Neighbourhood Renewal Corporation, and City of Brandon. Brandon, MB. May 2019.
- Transcona Welcome Mats: three sidewalk murals commissioned by Transcona Biz Improvement Zone. Winnipeg, MB. July 2019.
- Zoo Lights Festival, with Mike Friesen and Michael Koch-Schulte: animal-themed light installations at Assiniboine Park Zoo. Winnipeg, MB. Jan. 2020.
- The Jeep!: Styrofoam replica of World War II jeep commissioned by Princess Auto. Winnipeg, MB. Jan. 2020.
- The Wheel: large-scale metal art sculpture erected as part of the Dawson Trail Art and Heritage Tour in southern Manitoba, Nov. 2022

=== Collections ===
James Culleton Designs produces large and small-scale textile and fabric pieces based on Culleton's art.

== Awards and distinctions ==
- 2021: Support - Adapt Grant for Media Arts; Music; Visual arts, Manitoba Arts Council
- 2021: Individual Artist Grant for Artists Working in All Artistic Disciplines, Winnipeg Arts Council
- 2018: W. Cliff Packer Memorial Award at the Open Juried Competition and Exhibition of the Manitoba Society of Artists for the piece "Forks River Trail."
- 2015: Pinnacle Award from the American Society of Furniture Designers in the category of motion furniture for his M1 series, designed for Palliser Furniture.
- 2015: EQ3 Generation Art award for textile design, used to produce limited-edition pillows, ottomans, and napkins sold in support of the Michaëlle Jean Foundation.
- 2005: Bourse en Arts Visuels from the Conseil des Arts et des Lettres du Québec, awarded for research and creation in architecture, media arts, visual arts, and craftsmanship.

== Exhibitions ==
- Je suis ici/I Am Here: La Maison des Artistes, St. Boniface, MB. Oct. 8 - 20, 2020
- Vanished Days: Prairie Fusion Arts & Entertainment Centre, Portage la Prairie, MB. Feb. 18 - Mar. 28, 2020
- Lyrical Lines: Drawings by James Culleton: Wayne Arthur Gallery, St. Boniface, MB. Feb. 5 - 20, 2020
- Drawings and Watercolours of Transcona: Transcona Funeral Chapel, Winnipeg, MB. June 8, 2019
- Dear Margery: North Dakota Museum of Art, Grand Forks, ND. Sept. 24, 2016 - Jan. 15, 2017
- Perjinkities: Sketchbook Drawing Exhibition: Art City, Inc., Winnipeg, MB. Sept. 20 - Oct. 20, 2007
- Contouring Quebec: Portage and District Arts Centre, Portage la Prairie, MB. June 2008

== Workshops and classes ==
- 2018–present: Instructor at Winnipeg Art Gallery
- 2017–present: Instructor at Forum Art Centre, Winnipeg, MB
- 2016-2021: Instructor in Graphic Design and Manual Writing and Design, Continuing Education Department, Red River College, Winnipeg, MB

== Publications ==
=== Books ===
- Contouring Quebec, c2009.
- Lyrical Lines, c2011
- McCanna House c2016

=== Albums ===
- The Minglers [self-titled] c2001
- Brokenhead c2003
- Ca va bien, today? c2009
- Memento, c2012
- Vanished Days, c2016
- At Christmas Time, c2018<
- Spooky Songs (with the Coffin Bangers, featuring Al Simmons), c2019
- Unusual Friendships, c2020
- Superfun, c2022
- Big Songs for a Small World, c2022
- Superfun Too! c2024
- Superfolk c2025
