= Zaac Pick =

Canadian singer-songwriter

- Born: Medicine Hat, Alberta, Canada
- Occupation: Singer-songwriter
- Instrument: Guitar
- Formerly of: Doubting Paris
- Website: www.zaacpick.com

Zaac Pick is a Canadian singer-songwriter. Born in Medicine Hat, Alberta, he currently resides in Vancouver, British Columbia. Formerly part of the Vancouver based band Doubting Paris as a guitarist, Pick began his solo project and released his debut EP Fierce Wind in 2009. The record was produced by producer and friend Daniel Mendez who has also worked on Dashboard Confessional and Duran Duran albums. Pick's music was featured in a few television shows, including CW network drama One Tree Hill and CBS'sThe Ghost Whisperer. His former band Doubting Paris has also earned spots on MTV hits Joan of Arcadia, The Real World, and America's Next Top Model. The band has also opened for Pilot Speed, Keane, and David Usher. Recently, Pick was selected as the winner of the 104.3 Shore FM competition with a grand prize of $20,000. In October 2010, he played a show to help raise funds for flood victims in Pakistan. Pick has performed extensively in Western Canada and will be performing in the Canadian Music Fest in Toronto in 2011. He can be heard with a band that consists of drums, bass, electric guitar, cello, and violin in addition to solo performances. He is a frequent collaborator with composer and violinist Caleb Chan and cellist Brian Chan. According to an interview with Scout Magazine, Pick was a former league bowler.
