= Rachel Therrien =

Canadian jazz trumpeter, composer and bandleader

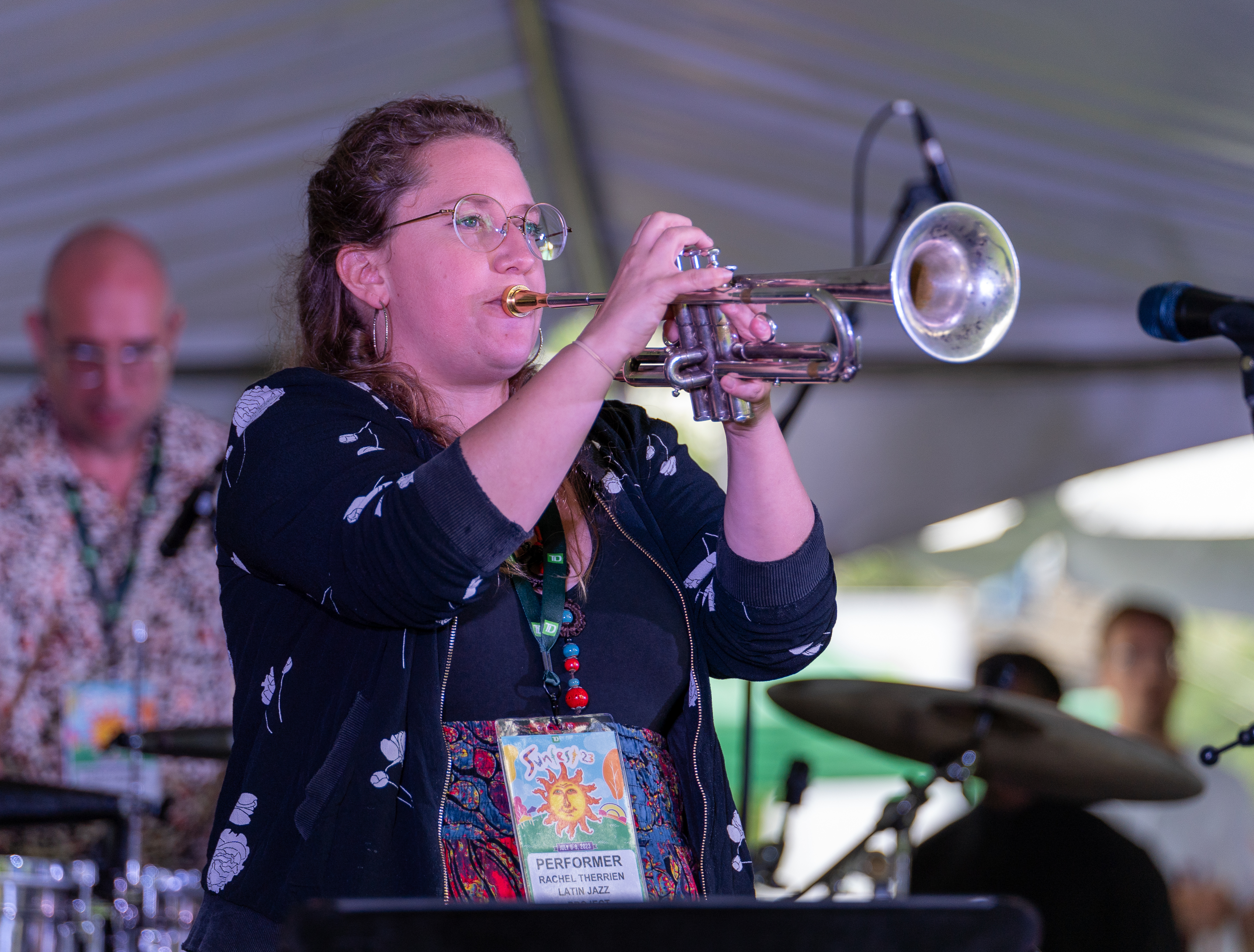
- Rachel Therrien performing at the 2023 Sunfest festival

Background information
- Born: Rimouski, Quebec, Canada
- Genres: Jazz; Latin jazz; World music
- Occupations: musician; composer; record producer
- Instruments: Trumpet; Flugelhorn
- Years active: 2009–present
- Labels: Truth Revolution Records; Multiple Chords Music; Bonsaï Music
- Website: racheltherrien.com

Rachel Therrien is a French-Canadian jazz trumpeter, composer and bandleader. Three-time Grammy-nominated trumpeter, composer, producer, and bandleader. Known for her emotionally charged sound and fearless improvisation, Therrien crafts bold music at the intersection of contemporary jazz and Afro-diasporic traditions, blending Afro-Caribbean and Latin American rhythmic forms into a powerful, modern language. Based between New York City, Montreal, and Havana, her artistry is shaped by deep cultural immersion — and a mission: using jazz as a space for community, belonging, and dialogue.

A winner of the TD Grand Prize Jazz Award (Montreal International Jazz Festival) and the Stingray Rising Star Award, Therrien is also a multiple JUNO and ADISQ nominee. Her work has received international recognition through GRAMMY-nominated projects including Virtual Birdland with Arturo O’Farrill and the Afro Latin Jazz Orchestra, Mundo Agua – Celebrating Carla Bley, and The Original Influencers: Dizzy, Chano & Chico.

As a leader, she has released ten albums, including her Latin Jazz Project (Mi Hogar / Mi Hogar II) which is a musical home built through collaboration and collective rhythm. She also explores intimacy and musical conversation through Dialogue Vol. I (2025) and Dialogue Vol. II (2026), her duo with Spanish pianist Albert Marqués (Chronograph Records). A sought-after artist worldwide, she has performed at Blue Note NYC, SFJAZZ, Birdland, Duc des Lombards, Lincoln Center SummerStage, and the Hollywood Bowl, while continuing to mentor the next generation teaching at NJCU and Christian McBride’s Jazz House Kids.

== Discography ==
Band Leader:

- Dialogue Vol II Rachel Therrien & Albert Marques (Chronograph Records, 2025)
- Dialogue Rachel Therrien & Albert Marques (Chronograph Record, 2025)
- Mi Hogar II Rachel Therrien (LulaWorld Records,, 2025)
- CAPI – Les poèmes de Charles Lebel Therrien en Musique Rachel Therrien (Corne de brume, 2024)
- Mi Hogar Rachel Therrien (Outside In Music, 2023)
- Vena Rachel Therrien (Bonsai Music, 2020)
- Carol of the Bells Rachel Therrien & Adam Goulet – Single (2021)
- Why Don’t You Try Rachel Therrien (Multiple Chord Music, 2017)
- Pensamiento: Proyecto Colombia Rachel Therrien (One RPM, 2016)
- Home Inspiration Rachel Therrien (Multiple Chord Music, 2014)
- On Track Rachel Therrien (Fair Jazz, 2011)

Music Producer:

- Stories – Manon Mullener (2025)
- Ramas Lejanas – Anamaria Oramas (2023)
- AGente – Anamaria Oramas (2023)
- Fandango Frio – Anamaria Oramas (2023)
- Caídas– La Peluda (2022)
- Impulso – Danza Descalza (2022)
- Rindete – Noe Lira (2021)
- Latiendo la Tierra – Noe Lira (2021)

Guest & Features Artist:

- Ostara Roots – The Ostara Project (2025)
- Stories – Manon Mullener (2025)
- Mundoagua – Arturo O’Farrill & The Afro Latin Jazz Orchestra (2025)
- Marimbissimo: A Latin American Suite for Marimba and Big Band – Juan Álamo (2024)
- Mother Flower en Nueva York – Flor de Toloache (2024)
- The Head of a Mouse – Audrey Ochoa (2024)
- Duality – Sanah Kadoura (2023)
- Santiago Brooklyn Santiago – Santiago Big Band feat. Marcos Fernandez, *Afro Latin Jazz Orchestra & Arturo O’Farrill (2023)
- A Gente – Anamaria Oramas (2023)
- The Diva Jazz Orchestra “30” (Live at Dizzy’s Club) – The Diva Jazz Orchestra (2023)
- Compass – Will Clements (2023)
- Typuhthâng – Vivienne Aerts (2023)
- TBC – Jean Phi Dary (2023)
- Spark Bird – Emilie-Claire Barlow (2023)
- Blue in Green Remix – Eugene Marlow & Grace Schulman (2023)
- The Ostara Project – The Ostara Project (2022)
- Caidas – LaPeluda (2022)
- Diva Swings Broadway – The Diva Jazz Orchestra (2022)
- Gare du Sud – Pablo Murgier Ensemble (2022)
- Please Only Tell Me Good News – 360° Jazz Initiative (2022)
- Son Divas y Sus Invitadas Internacionales – Son Divas (2022)
- Bogota Suena, Vol. 4 – Compilation (2022)
- Virtual Birdland – Arturo O’Farrill & Afro Latin Jazz Orchestra (2021) (Grammy Nomination)
- Together Again – Truth Revolution Recording Collective (2021)
- Latiendo la tierra – Noé Lira (2021) (Nomination ADISQ)
- Open World – Chad LB (2021)
- Cool Jazz Party – Compilation (2021)
- Bogota Suena – Compilation (2020)
- Montreal – Elizabeth Shepherd (2020)
- Ocean Avenue – Juana Luna (2019)
- Deshojares – Catalina Avila (2019)
- Muntu – Anamaria Oramas (2019)
- DIVA + The Boys – The Diva Jazz Orchestra (2019)
- Post Bop Pawn Shop – Annam Nguyen (2019)
- Calliari Bang Bang! – Marco Calliari (2019)
- Le Grand Voyage – Karine Ste-Marie (2018)
- 25th Anniversary – The Diva Jazz Orchestra (2018)
- 75th Anniversary – Orchestre Septentrional d’Haïti (2018)
- What It Takes – Shannon Gunn (2017)
- Home: Montreal – Beth McKenna Jazz Orchestra (2016)
- Une Belle Poire, Mûre à Point, Prête à donner sa vie à un grand appétit – *Emile Gruff (2016)
- Début – BEA Box (2016)
- Revuelta Danza Party – Gypsy Kumbia Orchestra (2015)
- Immigrand – Wesli (2014)
- Enfant de la Terre – Samian (2014)
- Au Coeur du Rythme – Véronique Boucher (2014)
- Start – Beth McKenna Jazz Orchestra (2014)
- Pa’l Monte – Ramon y su Son (2012)
- Liberté dans le noir – Wesli (2012)
- Les années Waverly – Patrick Hamilton (2012)
- Rire aux larmes – Julie Massicotte (2011)
- Now Where is Now Here – Trusted Waters (2011)
- Kouraj – Wesli (2009)
- Au blanc des Jours – Mathieu Thioly (2009)
- Volume 1 – Big Band de l’Université de Montréal (2008)
- Cuttin’ Loose – Kevin Mark (2007)
- Popus – La Baroque Machine (2006)
- Volume 1 – Gogo Jungle (2006)

== Honours ==
Wins:

- 2019 50e Prix LOJIQ (CA), Les Offices Jeunesses Internationales de Québec
- 2016 Stingray Rising Star Award (CA), Halifax Jazz Festival
- 2015 TD Grand Prize Jazz Award (CA), Montreal International Jazz Festival

Nominations:

- 2021 Juno Awards (CA), Best Jazz Album: Solo (VENA)
- 2020 ADISQ Awards (CA), Best Jazz Album (VENA)
- 2018 Independent Music Awards (US), Best Jazz Record Producer (Why Don't You Try?)
