= Charles Fairfield =

English painter

Charles Fairfield (1761? – 1805) was an English painter, best known as a copyist. He died in Brompton, London in 1805.

== Life ==
Fairfield was described in his obituary in the Gentleman's Magazine as "a painter of extraordinary merit and knowledge in his profession, but of so modest and diffident a disposition, that, notwithstanding his acknowledged talents, he rarely ventured to paint from the impulse of his own mind, and would not do it at all unless urged thereto by the importunity of friends." His obituarist also claimed that Fairfield was exploited by dealers, who made large profits by passing off his copies of old masters, which he had painted with no intention of deceit, as originals, and described him as "never easy in his circumstances" and having lived "a very chequered and uncomfortable life."

He died in Brompton, London in 1805, aged about 45.

== Works ==
Fairfield is best known as a copyist of the works of the Dutch and Flemish masters of the 17th century. His copy of Teniers's Le Bonnet Rouge was, according to a manuscript note in James Hughes Anderdon's Collectanea Biographica, "of the most striking perfection of finish and tone, capable of deceiving any one could it have but age".

He also made a few etchings, including one of a Cavalier at the Door of an Inn, after Gabriël Metsu.

== Sources ==
This article incorporates text from a publication now in the public domain: "Fairfield, Charles". Dictionary of National Biography. London: Smith, Elder & Co. 1885–1900.
