= Fortunate Ones =

Canadian indie folk duo

- Origin: St. John's, Newfoundland and Labrador, Canada
- Genres: Indie folk
- Years active: 2010–present
- Label: Old Farm Pony Records
- Members: Andrew James O'Brien; Catherine Allan
- Website: fortunateones.ca

Fortunate Ones is a Canadian indie folk duo from St. John's, Newfoundland, consisting of Andrew James O'Brien and Catherine Allan.

Their debut album, The Bliss, was released in 2015 on Old Farm Pony Records, the label founded by singer-songwriter Rose Cousins. The Bliss was produced by Daniel Ledwell, and recorded at his studio in Lake Echo, Nova Scotia.

O'Brien and Allan are a romantic couple as well as bandmates. O'Brien was previously a solo artist, having released the album Songs for Searchers in 2011, with Allan a part of his backing band. That album won him three Music Newfoundland and Labrador Awards. Allan has a degree in French studies from Memorial University and has also worked as a flight attendant. Both sing lead vocals, while O'Brien plays guitar, and Allan plays accordion and keyboards.

Two songs from the album, "Lay Me Down" and the title track "The Bliss", reached #1 on CBC Radio 2's The Radio 2 Top 20 in 2015.

Their album The Bliss was a shortlisted Juno Award nominee for Contemporary Roots Album of the Year at the Juno Awards of 2016, and won the Canadian Folk Music Award for Vocal Group of the Year at the 11th Canadian Folk Music Awards.

The duo's most recent album That Was You and Me won the East Coast Music Award for Folk Recording of the Year and was nominated for Contemporary Roots Album at the 2023 Juno Awards.
