= Coco Love Alcorn =

Canadian pop and jazz singer

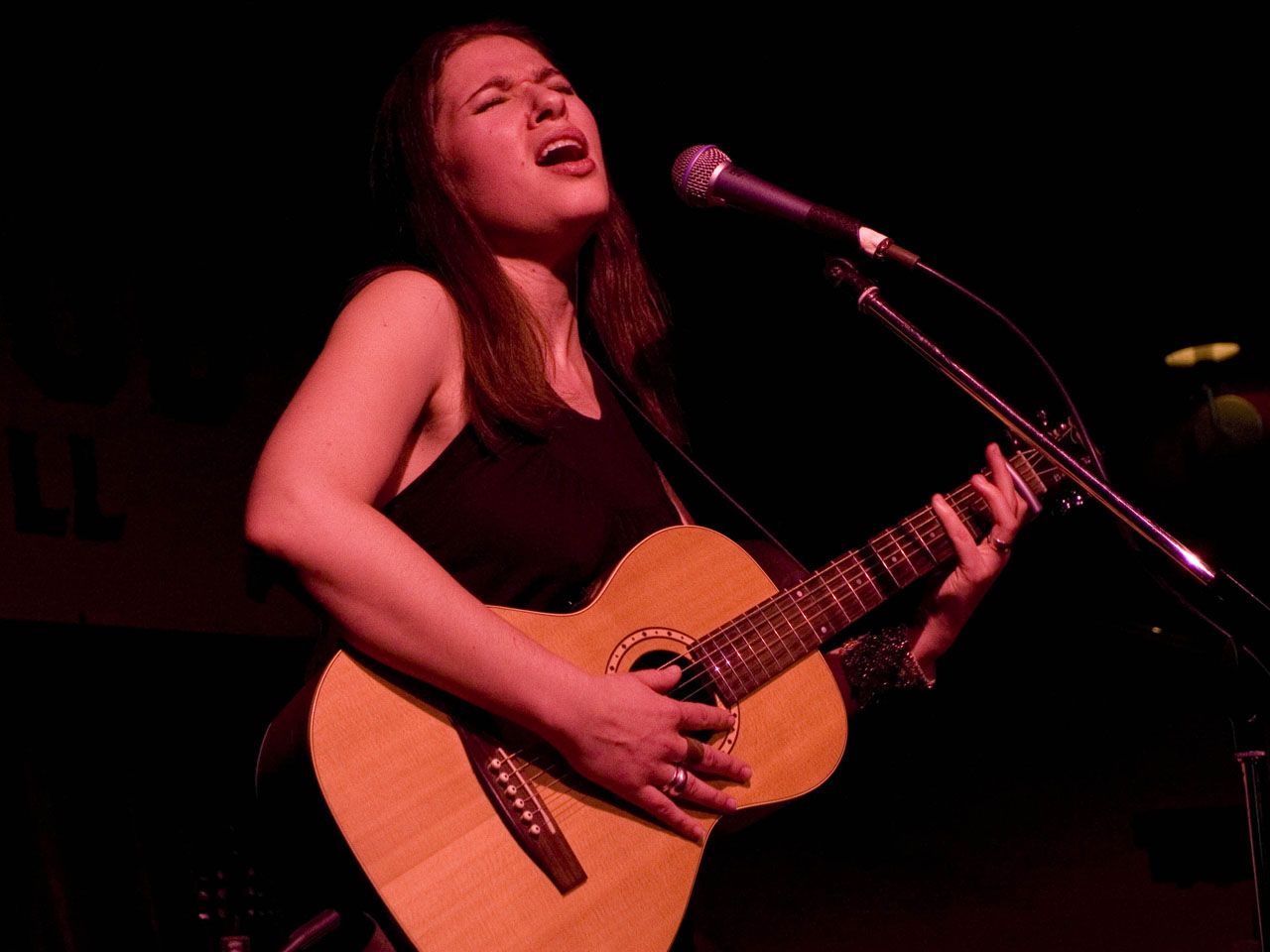
- Alcorn in 2007

Background information
- Born: Antigonish, Nova Scotia, Canada
- Genres: Pop, jazz,
- Occupation: Singer
- Instrument: Guitar
- Website: cocolovealcorn.com

Coco Love Alcorn is a Canadian pop and jazz singer. The daughter of jazz singer John Alcorn, she released her debut album in 1995. She toured as an opening act for Burton Cummings, Chantal Kreviazuk, Jesse Cook, and Ani DiFranco and performed on some Lilith Fair dates. She is a backing vocalist for 54-40, and her music has appeared on the television programs The Dead Zone and The L Word.

Alcorn is an avid cyclist who has written songs inspired by cycling and her bicycles.

Alcorn and Simon Farla became the parents of Eloise on 14 September 2010. After spending several years raising her daughter, she returned to music and released the album Wonderland in 2016. Alcorn was born in Antigonish, Nova Scotia, and moved several times with her family, living also in Toronto and Vancouver. She attended Berklee College of Music in Boston for one semester, then moved to Vancouver and began performing. She released her debut album in 1995. She moved to Toronto, then went on tour as the opening act for Ani DiFranco and as a backup singer for the Canadian rock band 54 40.

She won the Canadian Folk Music Award for Contemporary Singer of the Year at the 16th Canadian Folk Music Awards in 2021, for her album Rebirth.

== Discography ==
- We Speak Jazzenesse (1993 cassette)
- Coco Love Alcorn (1995)
- Happy Pockets (1997)
- 7 Coco Songs (2005)
- Sugar (Black Hen, 2006)
- Coco Love Solo (2007)
- Joyful (Sound of Pop, 2009)
- Play (2011)
- Wonderland (2016)
- Rebirth (2019)
