= 12th Canadian Folk Music Awards =

2016 music awards ceremony

- Date: December 3, 2016
- Location: Isabel Bader Theatre, Toronto, Ontario
- Country: Canada
- Website: folkawards.ca

The 12th Canadian Folk Music Awards were presented in Toronto, Ontario on December 3, 2016.

== Nominees and recipients ==
Recipients are listed first and highlighted in boldface.

Traditional Album	Contemporary Album
**Yann Falquet and Pascal Gemme, Princes et habitants**; Ten Strings and a Goat Skin, Auprès du poêle; The Slocan Ramblers, Coffee Creek; Vishtèn, Terre rouge; Fásta, Un Canadien errant	**David Francey, Empty Train**; Corin Raymond, Hobo Jungle Fever Dreams; The Strumbellas, Hope; Big Little Lions, Just Keep Moving; Donovan Woods, Hard Settle, Ain't Troubled
Children's Album	Traditional Singer
**The Kerplunks, Pants & Mammals**; Kattam, De Tombouctou à Bombay; Kathy Reid-Naiman, Welcome Summer; Charlie Hope, Songs, Stories and Friends 2: Where the Path Will Wind; Nadia Gaudet and Jason Burnstick, Dream Big, Little One / Fais de beaux rêves, petit ange	**Chaim Tannenbaum, Chaim Tannenbaum**; Rowen Gallant, Auprès du poêle; Shannon Quinn, If All the Young Ladies; Yves Lambert, Laissez courir les chiens; Sophie Lavoie (Fásta), Un Canadien errant
Contemporary Singer	Instrumental Solo Artist
**Jadea Kelly, Love & Lust**; William Prince, Earthly Days; Matt Andersen, Honest Man; Megan Bonnell, Magnolia; Danny Michel, Matadora	**Duane Andrews, Conception Bay**; Don Alder, Armed & Dangerous; Daniel Koulack, Frailing to Succeed; Arnie Naiman, My Lucky Stars; Lotus Wight, Ode to the Banjo
Instrumental Group	English Songwriter
**The Andrew Collins Trio, And It Was Good**; Tio Chorinho, Chora Brazil; NUA, Flow; Beppe Gambetta & Tony McManus, Round Trip; The East Pointers, Secret Victory	**Donovan Woods, Hard Settle, Ain't Troubled**; The Strumbellas, Hope; Royal Wood, Ghost Light; Danny Michel, Matadora; Cara Luft and J. D. Edwards (The Small Glories), Wondrous Traveler
French Songwriter	Aboriginal Songwriter
**Les soeurs Boulay, 4488 de l'Amour**; Richard Séguin, Les horizons nouveaux; Safia Nolin, Limoilou; Philippe Brach, Portraits de famine; Mara Tremblay, Michel Rivard, Luc De Larochellière, Éric Goulet, Gilles Bélanger, Ariane Ouellet and Carl Prévost, Sept jours en mai	**Twin Flames, Jaaji and Chelsey June**; Nadia Gaudet and Jason Burnstick, Dream Big, Little One / Fais de beaux rêves, petit ange; William Prince, Earthly Days; Digawolf, Great Northern Man; Amanda Rheaume, Holding Patterns
Vocal Group	Ensemble
**Musique à bouches, Jusqu'aux oreilles**; Rosie and the Riveters, Good Clean Fun!; Hillsburn, In the Battle Years; Big Little Lions, Just Keep Moving; Sweet Alibi, Walking in the Dark	**The East Pointers, Secret Victory**; Yves Lambert Trio, Laissez courir les chiens; Les Frères Berthiaume, Le temps des fêtes est terminé; Ten Strings and a Goat Skin, Auprès du poêle; Whitehorse, The Northern South, Vol. 1
Solo Artist	World Solo Artist
**David Francey, Empty Train**; Megan Bonnell, Magnolia; Shannon Quinn, If All the Young Ladies; Matt Andersen, Honest Man; Old Man Luedecke, Domestic Eccentric	**Willy Rios, Para ti**; Jocelyn Pettit, Caravan; Kattam, De Tombouctou à Bombay; Élage Diouf, Melokáane; Karim Saada, Mon frère
World Group	New/Emerging Artist
**Sultans of String, Subcontinental Drift**; Tio Chorinho, Chora Brazil; Nomadica, Dance of the Infidels; Lenka Lichtenberg & Fray, Live in America; Beppe Gambetta & Tony McManus, Round Trip	**Hillsburn, In the Battle Years**; Ben Caplan, Birds With Broken Wings; Evening Hymns, Quiet Energies; Old Whiskey Road, Under the Neon Lights; The Small Glories, Wondrous Traveler
Producer	Pushing the Boundaries
**David Gillis, Hobo Jungle Fever Dreams (Corin Raymond)**; Steve Dawson, I Was So Fond of You (Matt Patershuk); Matthew Barber and Jill Barber, The Family Album (Matthew Barber and Jill Barber); Andrew Collins and David Travers-Smith, And It Was Good (The Andrew Collins Trio); Royal Wood and Bill Leflr, Ghost Light (Royal Wood)	**Kaia Kater, Nine Pin**; Ten Strings and a Goat Skin, Auprès du poêle; Ozere, Finding Anyplace; Jim Bryson, Somewhere We Will Find Our Place; Whitehorse, The Northern South, Vol. 1
Young Performer	
**Earle and Coffin, Live at the Citadel House**; Jake Vance, Eden; Jessica Wedden, Fiddling Is My Passion; Chanelle Albert, How Beautiful We Are; Keltie Monaghan, Someone Tell Her	
