= William Prince (musician) =

Canadian musician (born 1986)

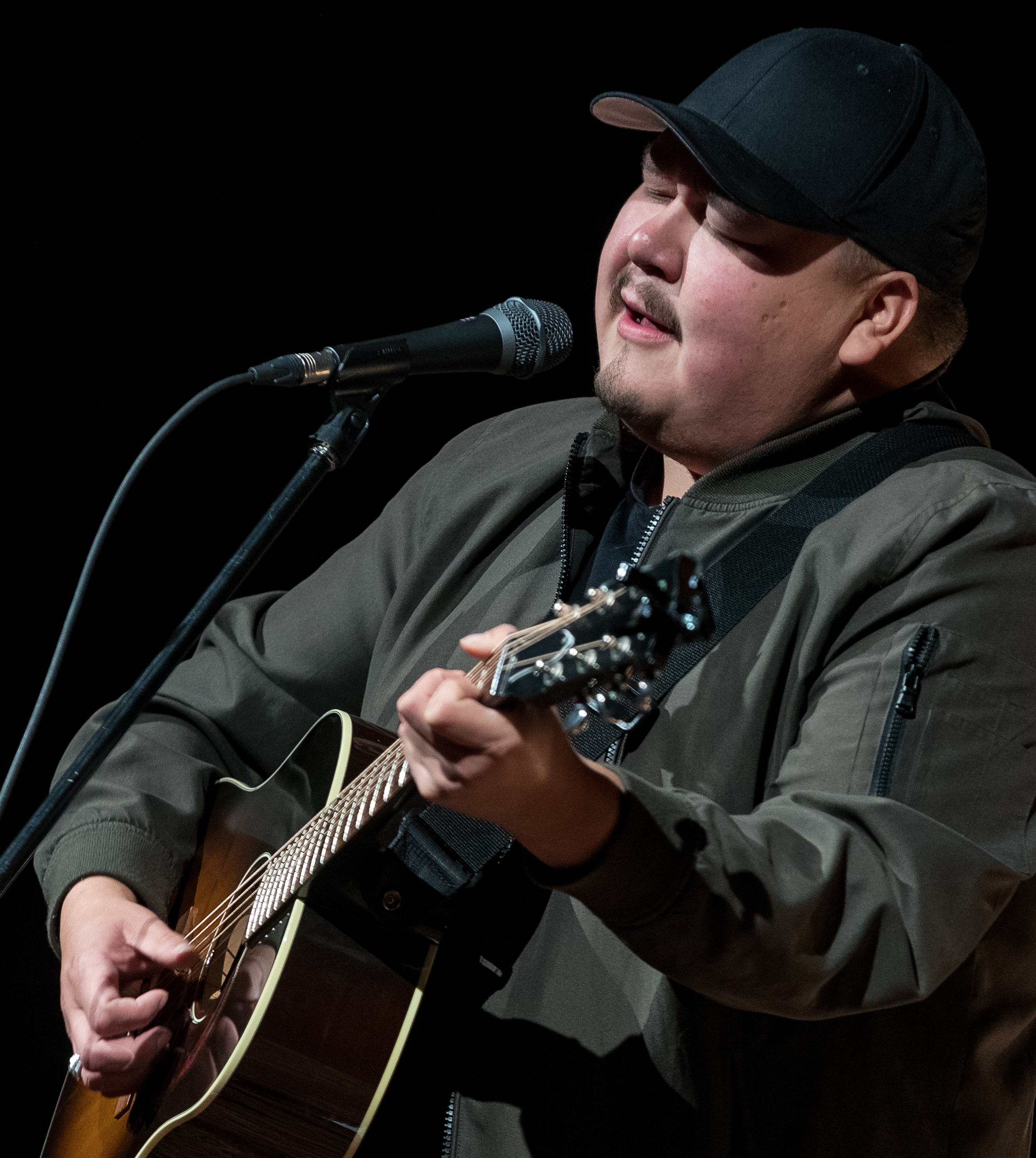

Background information
- Born: Selkirk, Manitoba
- Origin: Winnipeg, Manitoba
- Genres: Folk, country
- Occupations: Singer, songwriter
- Years active: 2012–present
- Labels: Six Shooter Records, Glassnote Records
- Formerly of: Indian City
- Website: williamprincemusic.com

William Prince (born 1986) is a Canadian folk and country singer-songwriter based in Winnipeg, Manitoba.

== Life and career ==
Prince was born in Selkirk, Manitoba, in 1986. He moved with his family to Peguis First Nation as a boy. Prince is a direct descendant of Peguis, a prominent First Nations leader in the 1800s.

Prince's father, Edward, was also a musician and preacher, who recorded a number of albums, and Prince travelled with his father playing gigs in northern Manitoba.

Prince released his solo debut album, Earthly Days, on December 11, 2015. The song "Breathless" reached No. 22 on the Billboard Adult Contemporary charts in 2018. Prince's second album, Reliever, was released on February 7, 2020. In October 2020, Prince released his third studio album, an album of country gospel songs called Gospel First Nation. The album included a mixture of new original songs, songs written by his father, and traditional gospel songs.

Prince also performed alongside Vince Fontaine and Don Amero in the band Indian City.

In 2022, he appeared at the Buffy Sainte-Marie tribute concert Buffy Sainte-Marie: Starwalker, performing both "Up Where We Belong" as a duet with Marie-Mai and "Now That the Buffalo's Gone" with the surviving members of The Tragically Hip. On February 18, 2023, he played at the Grand Ole Opry in Nashville, Tennessee, to great acclaim.

His fourth album, Stand in the Joy, was released on April 14, 2023, on Six Shooter Records. It was preceded in February by the preview tracks "When You Miss Someone" and "Tanqueray".

Ahead of the scheduled release of his fifth album, Further from the Country, in October 2025, Prince was the support act for Midland on their UK tour.

On June 12, 2026, Prince performed at the second opening ceremony of the 2026 FIFA World Cup in Toronto, Canada.

== Awards and accolades ==
Prince won the Western Canadian Music Award for Aboriginal Artist of the Year in 2016. He received a Canadian Folk Music Award nomination for Aboriginal Songwriter of the Year at the 12th Canadian Folk Music Awards. Prince won the Juno Award for Contemporary Roots Album of the Year at the Juno Awards of 2017 for his debut album, Earthly Days, and was a finalist for Indigenous Music Album of the Year.

His song "The Spark" won the 2020 SOCAN Songwriting Prize.

His 2020 album Reliever received a nomination for Contemporary Roots Album of the Year at the Juno Awards of 2021. He won two Canadian Folk Music Awards at the 16th Canadian Folk Music Awards in 2021, for Contemporary Album of the Year and English Songwriter of the Year.

At the 2021 Juno ceremony, Prince and Serena Ryder performed "The Spark" at Toronto's Church of the Holy Trinity. In 2022, Prince and Ryder also released the standalone singles "Sing Me a Song" and "River of Tears".

Stand in the Joy won the Juno Award for Contemporary Roots Album of the Year at the Juno Awards of 2024, and Prince was nominated for Songwriter of the Year for the songs "Broken Heart of Mine", "Easier and Harder" and "When You Miss Someone". At the 19th Canadian Folk Music Awards, he won Contemporary Album of the Year for Stand in the Joy, Solo Artist of the Year, and Single of the Year for "When You Miss Someone". Prince's album Stand in the Joy was nominated for Alternative Country Album of the Year at the 2024 Canadian Country Music Awards.

William Prince, was awarded an honorary Doctor of Letters degree from Nipissing University in June 2025. This was to recognize his work for as an award-winning singer-songwriter, a proud member of Peguis First Nation, and for using his music to build understanding within all of Canada.

== Discography ==
=== Studio albums ===
- Earthly Days (2015)
- Reliever (2020)
- Gospel First Nation (2020)
- Stand in the Joy (2023)
- Further from the Country (2025)

=== Singles ===
- "7" (2016)
- "You Can't Judge a Book by the Cover" (2018)
- "Breathless (Acoustic)" (2018)
- "The Spark" (2019)
- "Always Have What We Had" (2020)
- "Sing Me a Song" (2022, with Serena Ryder)
- "River of Tears" (2022, with Serena Ryder)
- "When You Miss Someone" (2023)
- "Tanqueray" (2023)
- "Lighthearted" (2026)
