= AHI (musician) =

Canadian singer-songwriter

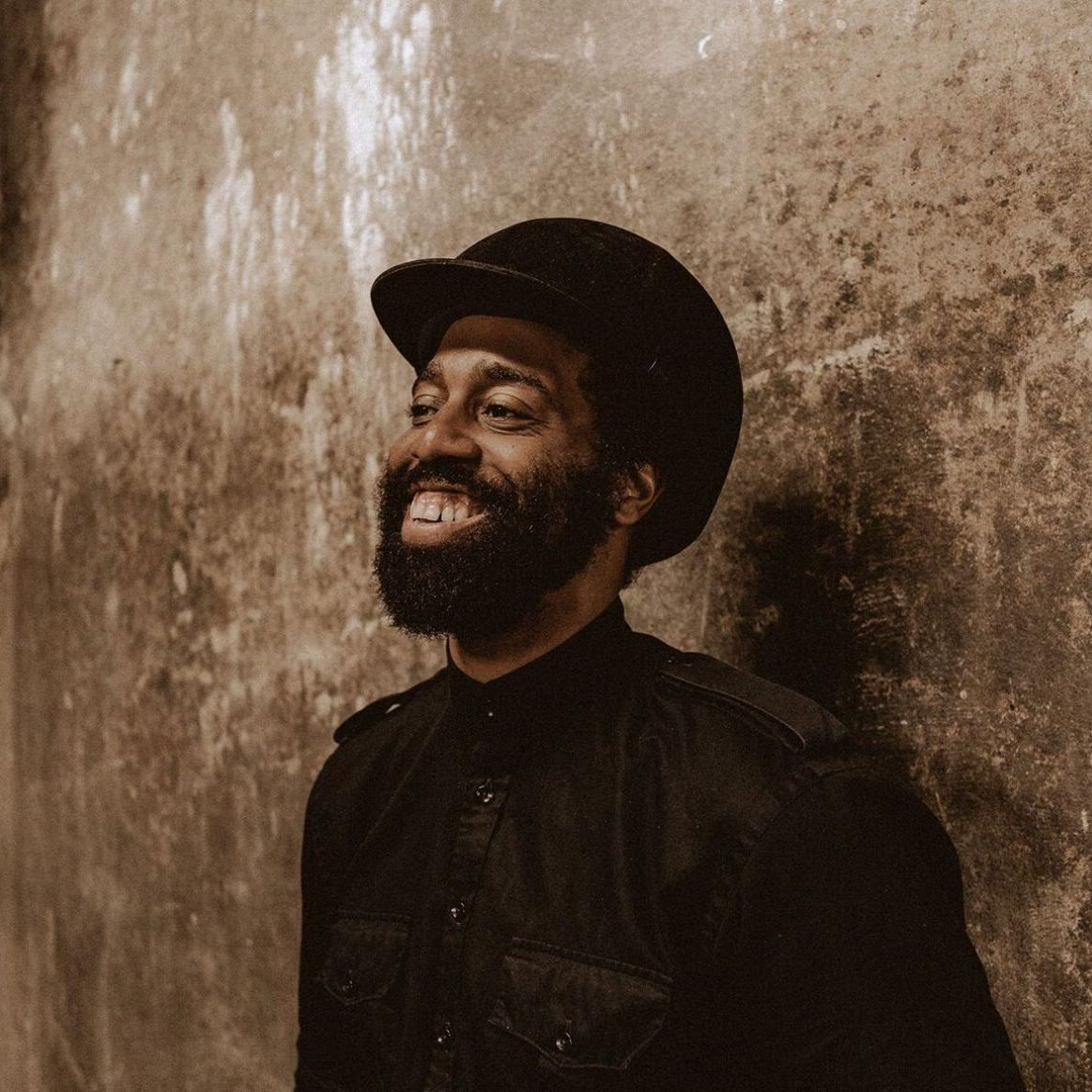
- AHI in 2023

Background information
- Born: Ahkinoah Habah Izarh
- Genres: Folk Singer

Ahkinoah Habah Izarh, better known by the stage name AHI (pronounced “eye”), is a Canadian singer-songwriter. He has been a two-time Juno Award nominee for Contemporary Roots Album of the Year, receiving nods at the Juno Awards of 2019 for his album In Our Time and at the Juno Awards of 2022 for his album Prospect.

Originally from Brampton, Ontario and based primarily in Toronto, he released his debut album We Made It Through the Wreckage in 2016. In 2017, he won the Canadian Songwriting Competition in the folk category, as well as the Stingray Rising Star Award at the Folk Music Ontario conference. He then signed to Thirty Tigers, which released his sophomore album In Our Time in 2018 and Prospect in 2021. The latter was longlisted for the 2022 Polaris Music Prize.

== Discography ==
=== Albums ===
- 2016: We Made It Through the Wreckage
- 2018: In Our Time
- 2021: Prospect
- 2021: Unarchived
- 2022: Prospect (Deluxe)
- 2025: The Light Behind the Sun

=== EP ===
- 2014: Indie Soul
- 2025: Call on Me
- 2026: Köln (Lost in Time)
- 2026: Human Kind feat. Tenille Townes
- 2026: House of Mirrors

=== Singles ===
- 2014: "Indie Soul"
- 2015: "Goldenous"
- 2016: "Drought"
- 2021: "Until You"
- 2022: "Until You (Lost Version)"
- 2023: "Your Song (Vapor IKEA Commercial)
- 2024: "Black Monday"
- 2024: "My People"
- 2024: "Plans"
- 2024: "Where I'm Coming From"
- 2025: "Human Kind - Acoustic"
- 2025: "No Woman, No Cry"
- 2025: "This Winter, This Christmas"
- 2026: "Way Home"

=== Featured on ===
- 2021: "Hold on to Me (feat. AHI)"
- 2021: "Hold on to Me (feat. AHI) [LIVE]"
- 2014: The Sound EP
