= Jory Nash =

- Born: Jory Kevin Nash
- Genres: Indie, folk
- Occupation: Singer-songwriter
- Instruments: Vocals, guitar
- Years active: N/A – present
- Label: Thin Man Records
- Website: www.jorynash.com

Jory Nash is a folk music-oriented Canadian singer-songwriter and musician based in Cobourg, Ontario, Canada.

Nash blends elements of folk, jazz, blues, soul and pop into an original stew of sound. He plays primarily acoustic guitar and piano, and occasionally plays the 5 string banjo.

Jory Nash has begun pre-production of his 10th album, to be recorded in Fall 2024 and released in April 2025.

== Albums ==
- One Way Down (1998)
- Tangle With the Ghost (2000)
- Lo-Fi Northern Blues (2002)
- Spaz Loves Weezie (2004)
- Folk, Jazz, Blues & Soul (2007)
- New Blue Day (2009)
- Little Pilgrim (2012)
- The Many Hats of Jory Nash (2015)
- Wilderness Years (2018)
- The Light Still Shines On The Main (2025)

== Awards ==
2001 Ontario Council of Folk Festivals "Songs From The Heart" Award for the song "When I Walk Out"

2010 Penguin Eggs Magazine's Critic's Poll Album of the Year for "New Blue Day"

2010 Canadian Folk Music Awards Nominee for Best Producer for "New Blue Day"

2013 Canadian Folk Music Awards Nominee for Best Producer for "Little Pilgrim"

2015 Canadian Folk Music Awards Nominee for Best Contemporary Singer & Best Producer for "The Many Hats of Jory Nash"

2018 Canadian Folk Music Award Nominee for Best Producer for "Wilderness Years"

== Career Outside of Music ==
Nash is a past director at the Canadian company "ALIVE Outdoors", which provides outdoors education and camping programs for schools and organizations in the Canadian Wilderness.
