= 14th Canadian Folk Music Awards =

2018 music awards ceremony

- Location: The Gateway, Calgary, Alberta
- Country: Canada
- Website: folkawards.ca

The 14th Canadian Folk Music Awards were presented on November 30 and December 1, 2018 in Calgary, Alberta.

== Nominees and recipients ==
Recipients are listed first and highlighted in boldface.

Traditional Album	Contemporary Album
**Matthew Byrne, Horizon Lines**; The Fretless, Live from the Art Farm; Genticorum, Avant l'orage; Babineau/Chartrand, Gigues à 2 faces; Buffy Sainte-Marie, Medicine Songs	**Donovan Woods, Both Ways**; Dave Gunning and J.P. Cormier, Two; The Lynnes, Heartbreak Song for the Radio; Gabrielle Papillon, Keep the Fire; The Wailin' Jennys, Fifteen
Children's Album	Traditional Singer
**Joseph Edgar, Lisa LeBlanc, Robin-Joël Cool, Wanabi Farmeur, Vishtèn, Caroline Savoie and Édith Butler, Grand tintamarre ! - Chansons et comptines acadiennes**; Jeremy Fisher Junior, Highway to Spell; The Oot n' Oots, Electric Jellyfish Boogaloo; Splash'N Boots, Love, Kisses and Hugs; The Swinging Belles, The Superstar Sibling Detective Agency	**Pharis Romero, Sweet Old Religion**; Matthew Byrne, Horizon Lines; Lenka Lichtenberg, Masaryk: Narodni pisne; Buffy Sainte-Marie, Medicine Songs; Diana Erb, Old Fashioned Way
Contemporary Singer	Instrumental Solo Artist
**Rob Lutes, Walk in the Dark**; Dana Wylie, The Earth That You're Made Of; Kellie Loder, Benefit of the Doubt; Catherine MacLellan, If It's Alright With You: The Songs of Gene MacLellan; Dylan Menzie, As the Clock Rewinds	**Jean-François Bélanger, Les entrailles de la montagne**; Holly Blazina, Transcendencia; Justin Gray, New Horizons; Dan MacDonald, Rural/Urban; Andrea Bettger, Snappy Day
Instrumental Group	English Songwriter
**The Fretless, Live from the Art Farm**; West of Mabou, The Bridge; Andrew Collins Trio, Groove; So Long Seven, Kala Kalo; Miller MacDonald Cormier, South Haven	**Lynne Hanson and Lynn Miles (The Lynnes), Heartbreak Song for the Radio**; Noosa Al-Sarraj, Wasted Time; Bruce Cockburn, Bone on Bone; Dana Sipos, Trick of the Light; Donovan Woods, Both Ways
French Songwriter	Indigenous Songwriter
**Anik Bérubé, Natalie Byrns, Christian Bernard and Frédéric Joyal (Ancolie), Le soleil en bulle**; Danny Boudreau, Mon été; Kristine St-Pierre, La promesse; Benoit Pinette, Désherbage; Étienne Fletcher, Face A	**Shauit, Apu peikussiak^{u}**; Tiffany Ayalik and Grey Gritt (Quantum Tangle), Shelter as we go...; Sandra Sutter, Cluster Stars; Dennis Shorty, Gucho Hin; Buffy Sainte-Marie, Medicine Songs
Vocal Group	Ensemble
**Pharis and Jason Romero, Sweet Old Religion**; The Good Lovelies, Shapeshifters; Dave Gunning and J.P. Cormier, Two; The Lynnes, Heartbreak Song for the Radio; The Fugitives, The Promise of Strangers	**The Lynnes, Heartbreak Song for the Radio**; The Fretless, Live from the Art Farm; Genticorum, Avant l'orage; Pharis and Jason Romero, Sweet Old Religion; The East Pointers, What We Leave Behind
Solo Artist	World Solo Artist
**Bruce Cockburn, Bone on Bone**; David Francey, The Broken Heart of Everything; Little Miss Higgins, My Home, My Heart; Catherine MacLellan, If It's Alright With You: The Songs of Gene MacLellan; Buffy Sainte-Marie, Medicine Songs	**Eliana Cuevas, Golpes Y Flores**; Jean-François Bélanger, Les entrailles de la montagne; Lenka Lichtenberg, Masaryk: Narodni pisne; Daniel Bellegarde, Anba Tonèl; Buffy Sainte-Marie, Medicine Songs
World Group	New/Emerging Artist
**Autorickshaw, Meter**; Near East, Near East; Oktopus, Hapax; Lemon Bucket Orkestra, If I Had the Strength; Minor Empire, Uprooted	**Raine Hamilton, Night Sky**; Annie Sumi, In the Unknown; The Lifers, Honey Suite; Jack Pine and the Fire, Left to Our Own Devices; Mattie Leon, Signal Hill; Aerialists, Group Manoeuvre
Producer	Pushing the Boundaries
**Steve Dawson, Same As I Ever Have Been (Matt Patershuk)**; Lynne Hanson and Lynn Miles, Heartbreak Song for the Radio (The Lynnes); Chris McKhool and John 'Beetle' Bailey, Christmas Caravan (Sultans of String); Ozan Boz, Uprooted (Minor Empire); Suzie Vinnick and Mark Lalama, Shake the Love Around (Suzie Vinnick)	**Beatrice Deer, My All to You**; Jean-François Bélanger, Les entrailles de la montagne; Quantum Tangle, Shelter as we go...; Cindy Doire, Panorama; La Suite, Inventions pour deux violoneux
Young Performer	Special Awards
**Earle and Coffin, A Day in July**; Christian Howse, We Were; Marley Mullan, Fiddle Dance; Ben Heffernan, Home; Jessica Wedden, One More Time	Unsung Hero: **Terry Wickham**
