= List of Turkish Canadians =

The following is a list of Turkish Canadians, including both original immigrants of full or partial Turkish descent who obtained Canadian citizenship and their Canadian descendants.

Most notable Turkish Canadians have come from, or originate from, Turkey but there are also notable Canadians of Turkish origin who have immigrated from, or descend from, the other former Ottoman territories, especially Turks from the Balkans, the island of Cyprus, the Levant, and North Africa.

== Academia ==
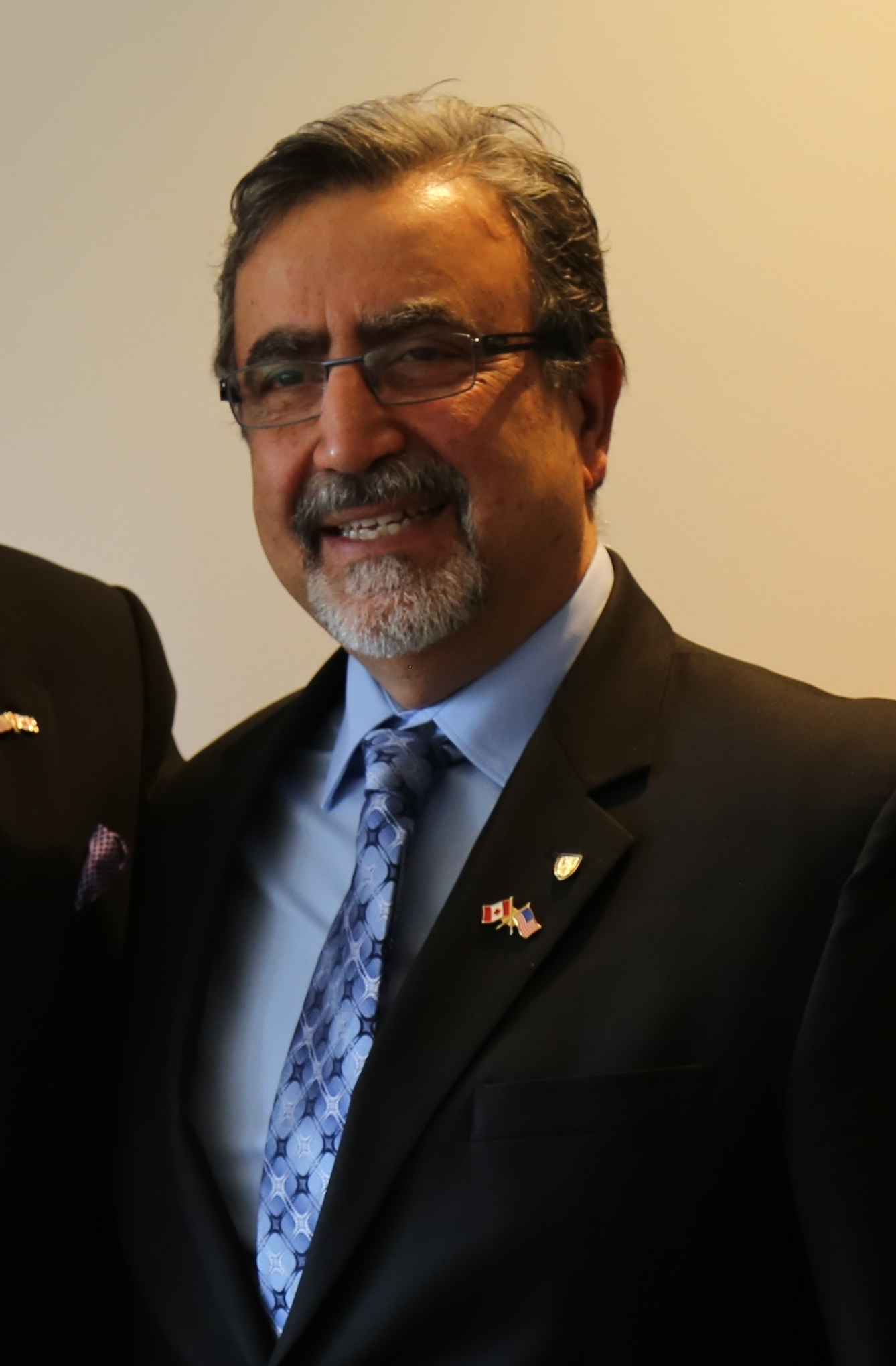
Feridun Hamdullahpur

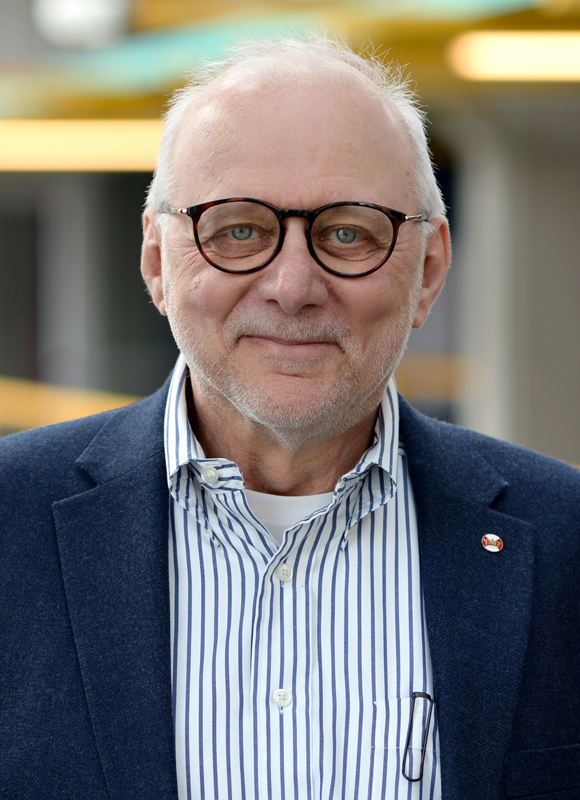
M. Tamer Özsu.

- Yaprak Baltacioğlu, Chancellor of Carleton University
- Henri Barki, social scientist
- Izak Benbasat, Professor of Information Systems and Professor of Management Information Systems at the University of British Columbia
- Fikret Berkes, Distinguished Professor Emeritus at the University of Manitoba's Natural Resources Institute
- Selim Deringil, Professor of History at Boğaziçi University
- Cigdem Eskicioglu, Professor of Engineering at the University of British Columbia
- Ramazan Gençay, Professor of Economics at University of Windsor, Carleton University, and Simon Fraser University
- Feridun Hamdullahpur, President of the University of Waterloo
- Melike Erol-Kantarci, computer scientist
- Ozay Mehmet, Professor of International Affairs at Carleton University
- Tuncer Ören, Professor of Computer Science at the University of Ottawa
- M. Tamer Özsu, Professor of Computer Science at University of Waterloo
- Semih Tezcan, Professor of Engineering and second president of Boğaziçi University
- Murat Tuncali, Professor of Mathematics at Nipissing University
- Aycan Yurtsever, physicist at the Université du Québec
- Mihriban Pekgüleryüz, metallurgist known for her development of light metal

== Arts and literature ==
- Derya Akay, artist
- Üstün Bilgen-Reinart, writer
- Alkan Chaglar, journalist
- Rima Elkouri, journalist and novelist
- Aline Gubbay, photographer, art historian and writer
- Timothy Guy Kent, painter
- Nil Köksal, journalist
- Nihal Mazloum, artist
- Robert Paul Weston, children's author

== Cinema and television ==
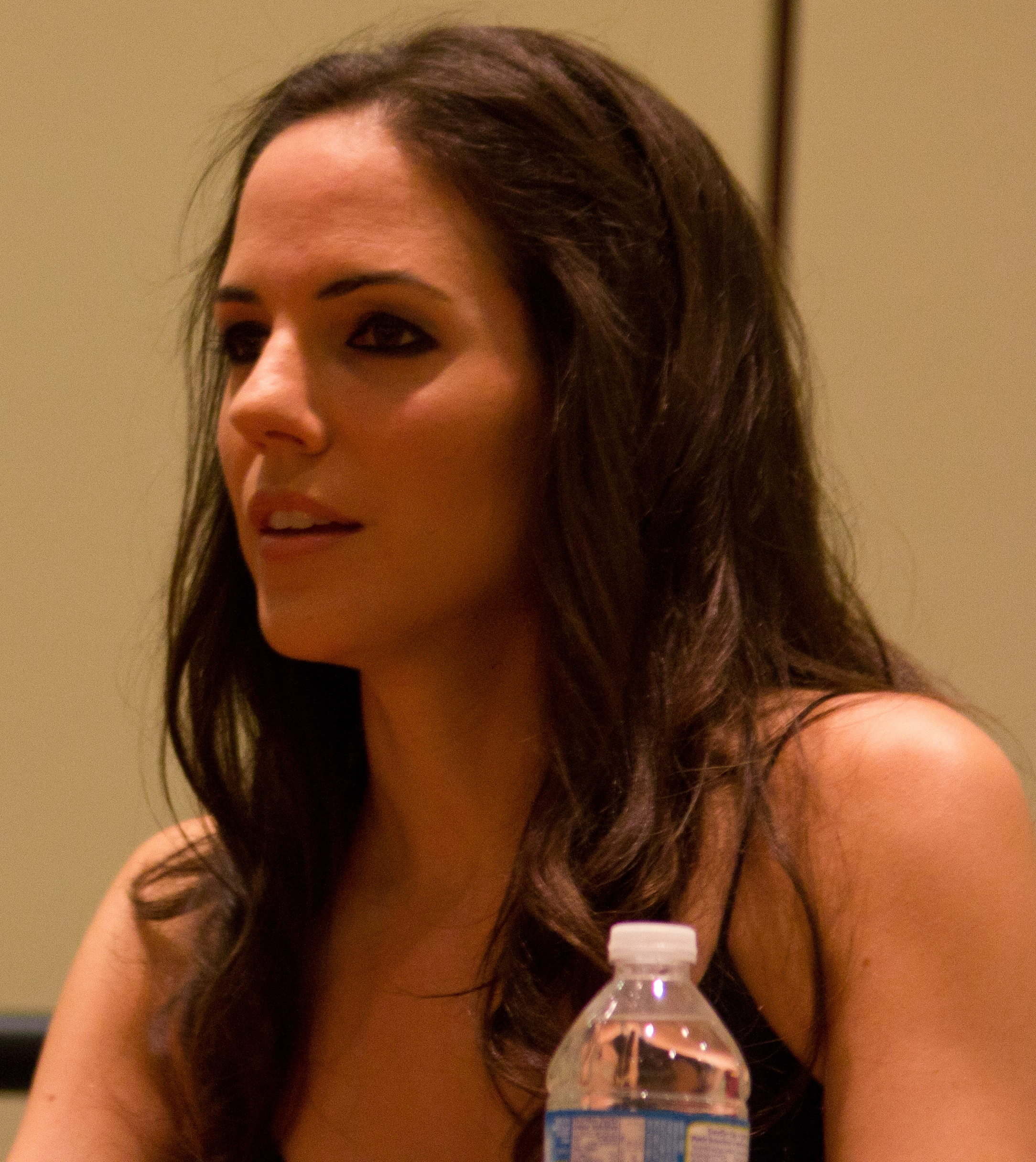
Anna Silk.

- Ennis Esmer, actor
- Onur Karaman, film director
- Arda Ocal, TV and radio broadcaster
- Anna Silk, actress (British-Turkish Cypriot mother)
- Ilkay Silk, CC, actress, playwright, producer, and educator (Turkish Cypriot origin)

== Fashion ==
- Erdem Moralioğlu, fashion designer

== Music ==
- Ozan Boz, musician and producer
- Mercan Dede, composer, ney and bendir player, DJ and producer
- Orhan Demir, jazz musician
- Minor Empire, Turkish-Canadian progressive music group
- Kaan Güneşberk, musician, songwriter, and composer
- Evren Ozdemir, rapper

== Model ==
- Aslihan Morali, Miss Universe Canada

== Sports ==
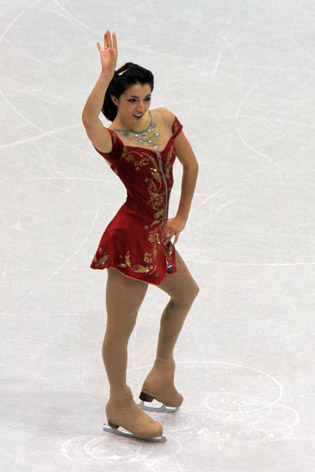
Tuğba Karademir

- Hıjran Alı Boyacı, football player
- Nick Cicek, ice hockey player
- Melisa Ertürk, women's football player
- Kaan İşbilen, basketball player
- Tuğba Karademir, figure skater
- Mesut Mert, football coach
- Enes Sali, football player
- Viola Yanik, wrestler
- Tugrul Ozer, Canadian sport shooter

== Other ==
- Sima Acan, canadian politician
- Fikret Berkes, ecologist
- Murad Al-Katib, agricultural entrepreneur

== See also ==
- List of Turkish Americans
- Turkish Canadians
- List of Canadians
