= Özsu =

Özsu or Özsü is a Turkish surname.

- M. Tamer Özsu
- Nurettin Özsü
- Umut Özsu Canadian legal scholar
