= No More Pennies =

Studio album by Dave Gunning
- Released: September 18, 2012
- Recorded: Wee House of Music Co.
- Genre: Folk
- Length: 44:07
- Label: Wee House of Music Co.
- Producer: Jamie Robinson

Dave Gunning chronology
Christmas Too (2011)	No More Pennies (2012)	Lift (2015)

Professional ratings
Review scores
Source	Rating

No More Pennies is the ninth studio album by Canadian singer-songwriter Dave Gunning. The album was released in 2012 by Wee House of Music.

The lyrics from the song These Hands" were used as the foundation of a book produced by Time Well Spent Publishing. The book includes illustrations by Meaghan Smith. Sheet music and lyrics are also included. A portion of proceeds are contributed to the IWK Health Centre Foundation.

== Issues with Royal Canadian Mint over artwork ==
The Canadian penny is heavily featured within the album's artwork. The back cover includes a penny setting into the horizon and the inner image of the package showcases an old-fashioned steam locomotive with pennies for wheels.

After an initial pressing of 2000 copies of No More Pennies, the Royal Canadian Mint notified Gunning that he must pay $1,200 for usage rights of the penny image. Gunning responded by initiating a penny drive to help pay the fee. The story received coverage from significant print and online news outlets, including The Globe and Mail, The Toronto Sun and The Huffington Post. Eventually the Royal Canadian Mint waived the royalty. Gunning's penny drive raised $6,287.66 which was donated to the IWK Health Centre in Halifax. Gunning will not have to pay fees for use of the penny image for any subsequent pressings of the album.

== Great Canadian Song Quest ==
Gunning submitted the song "A Game Goin' On" to the 2013 edition of Great Canadian Song Quest: CBC's Hockey Night in Canada Song Quest. The song advanced to the top 10 of the competition. On January 1, 2014, during the NHL Winter Classic, it was announced that "A Game Goin' On" was the winner of Song Quest. Joel Plaskett will produce a new version of the song. Gunning is set to perform "A Game Goin' On" in Saskatchewan on Hockey Day in Canada.

== Track listing ==
No.	Title	Length
1.	"All Along The Way"	3:24
2.	"Coal From The Train"	4:18
3.	"We Can't Win"	3:30
4.	"A Game Goin' On (feat. David Francey)"	3:18
5.	"These Hands"	4:08
6.	"The Family Name"	4:12
7.	"Too Soon To Turn Back"	3:45
8.	"Little White Seeds (feat. Karine Polwart)"	4:15
9.	"When The Cold Weather Comes"	3:22
10.	"The Weight of My Guitar"	4:21
11.	"That's When We Fell"	3:36
12.	"Living in Alberta"	3:24

== Personnel ==
- Dave Gunning – guitars, vocals
- Jamie Robinson – guitars, mandolin, banjo, bouzouki, piano, organ, melodica, percussion, background vocals
- Adam Dowling – drums, percussion
- Ronald Hynes – upright bass
- Bruce Guthro – background vocals

=== Additional musicians ===
- Jeremy Keddy – uilleann pipes on Little White Seeds.
- Andrew Sneddon – dobro on Living in Alberta.
- Andrew Sneddon – guest vocal on A Game Goin' On (recorded by Ken Friesen).
- Karine Polwart – guest vocal on Little White Seeds (recorded by Mattie Foulds).
- The choir on These Hands consists of: Karen Corbin, Cheryl Corbin, Ann Gunning, Sara Gunning, Adam Dowling, Ronald Hynes, Bruce Guthro, Jamie Robinson and the grade 5 students of West Pictou Consolidated School.

=== Other personnel ===
- Recorded and mixed by Dave Gunning and Jamie Robinson at Wee House of Music Co. in Pictou County, Nova Scotia.
- Mastered by Tim Branton at João Carvalho Mastering in Toronto.
- Art direction, design & layout by Michael Wrycraft of A Man Called Wrycraft www.wrycraft.com.
- Cover photo by Chris Smith at funkfactor.
- Inner photo by Naomi Henderson.

== Awards and nominations ==
Great Canadian Song Quest:

- 2014 CBC Hockey Night in Canada Song Quest – Winner (A Game Goin' On)

East Coast Music Awards:

- 2014 Solo Recording of the Year – Winner (No More Pennies)
- 2014 Songwriter of the Year – Winner (These Hands from No More Pennies)
- 2014 Entertainer of the Year Nomination
- 2014 Video of the Year, These Hands Nomination (Director: Scott Simpson)
- 2013 Song of the Year – Winner (These Hands from No More Pennies)

Music Nova Scotia Awards:

- 2013 Folk Recording of the Year – Winner (No More Pennies)

International Songwriting Credits:

- 2014 Great American Song Contest – Winner (These Hands)
- 2013 International Songwriting Competition – Semi Finalist (These Hands)
