= Lefteris Bournias =

- Born: September 3, 1968 (age 58)
- Origin: Astoria, New York, U.S.; Bayside, New York
- Genres: Greek traditional, Gypsy, Classical, Turkish Gypsy, rhythmical and harmonic Jazz
- Occupations: Clarinetist
- Instruments: Clarinet
- Years active: 1989–present
- Website: http://www.apolloorchestras.com/

Lefteris Bournias Greek Λευτέρης Μπουρνιάς (born September 3, 1968) is a Greek-American clarinetist and leader of Apollo Orchestras.

== Biography ==
Lefteris Bournias was born in Queens, New York, and grew up there as well as in Greece. His parents came to America from the Greek island of Chios. Lefteri has played the clarinet since age 11, strongly influenced by his father, Elias Bournias, a Greek floghera player, who introduced him to the music of his ancestors from Asia minor in modern-day Tsesme (Çeşme).

Lefteris’ style combines Greek traditional, Gypsy, Classical, Turkish Gypsy, and elements of Jazz (rhythmical and harmonic). and is largely self-taught.

Living near famous gypsy clarinetist, Mr. Vasilis Soukas, Lefteris Bournias frequented his house for lessons while attending the Athens Conservatory of Music under the guidance of clarinetist Mr. Farandatos. Later, he underwent graduate studies at the Aaron Copland School of Music at Queens College earning a B.A. in Performance and a Masters of Science in Music Education.

== Professional ==
Lefteris Bournias is the founder and leader of Apollo Orchestras, serving the Greek-American Community with quality, traditional, and modern Greek music as well as American music. He specializes in the duple Syrto (Syrtos) and the Tsifteteli, both music styles of the Greek island Chios and tours annually to the island to perform in festivals.

Lefteris Bournias is also the founder and leader of the Kavala Brass Band, which plays Greek music from the region of Florina and Edessa in Western Macedonia and annually performs at the Zlatne Uste Golden Festival in Brooklyn.

He is a member of the Meandros Ensemble, featuring the urban music of Constantinople (Istanbul) and Smyrna, performs with Electra Curtis, a violinist who fuses Greek and Arabic music in the Elektra Ensemble as well as with the Middle Eastern group Shusmo.

Notable performances include: Zorba the Greek performed with NY Pops, orchestrated by the legendary jazzman, Skitch Henderson at Lincoln Center, and a clarinet solo during the debut of Cuban percussionist/composer Roberto Rodriguez's Orquesta Sarabia, a 10-piece group of "All World Music" at the David Rubinstein Atrium at Lincoln Center.

Through the years, Mr. Bournias has performed and recorded with artist such as the New York Philharmonic, Queens Borough Philharmonic, En hordes, Uri Cane, Charles Genus, Henry Hay, Matt Garisson, Gene Lake, Charles Blesing, Steve Haas, Nikos and Giasemi Saragoudas, Spiros Exaras Band, Avram Pengas Noga Group, Ara Dinkjian, Uri Yunakoff, Omar Faruk Tekbelik, Okay Temiz, Selim Sesler, Takis Zaharatos, Hristos Antoniadis, Stathis Aggelopoulos, Eleni Legaki, Nikos Hatzopoulos, Makis Hristodoulopoulos, Pitsa Papadopoulou, Peggy Zina, Doukissa and many more.
