= Lift (Dave Gunning album) =

Studio album by Dave Gunning
- Released: July 28, 2015
- Recorded: Wee House of Music Co.
- Genre: Folk
- Length: 44:53
- Label: Wee House of Music Co.
- Producer: Dave Gunning

Dave Gunning chronology
No More Pennies (2012)	Lift (2015)

Professional ratings
Review scores
Source	Rating

Lift is the 11th studio album by Canadian singer-songwriter Dave Gunning. It was released in 2015 by Wee House of Music. On Lift, Gunning collaborated with musicians from Nova Scotia, New Brunswick, Prince Edward Island, and North Carolina. It is the first album of Gunning's albums to be self-produced.

== Track listing ==
All songs written by Dave Gunning, except where noted.

No.	Title	Writer(s)	Length
1.	"The Don't Do That No More"	Dave Gunning, Jim Dorie	3:17
2.	"A Tractor"		3:13
3.	"The Changin' Wind"	Dave Gunning, Ray Stewart	3:30
4.	"Sing It Louder"	Dave Gunning, Sally Spring	4:01
5.	"Breaker's Yard"	Dave Gunning, Jamie Robinson	3:59
6.	"A Halo That Fits"		2:55
7.	"I Robbed The Co. Store"		3:45
8.	"From on Higher Ground"	Dave Gunning, Jim Dorie	3:39
9.	"Love Fell In"	Dave Gunning, Thom Swift	3:47
10.	"Alberta Gold"	Dave Gunning, Matt Andersen	3:03
11.	"Pasadena"	Dave Gunning, Catherine MacLellan	3:43
12.	"The Red Onion"	Dave Gunning, John Meir	3:48
13.	"To Be With You"		2:13

== Personnel ==
- Dave Gunning – acoustic guitars, vocals, background vocals, ukulele, percussion, organ, banjo on track 4 and 10, other little sounds here and there
- Jamie Robinson – mandolin on track 10, hammertone on track 5, acoustic guitar on track 9, electric guitar on track 6
- Asa Brosius – pedal steel
- Darren McMullen – mandolin, mandola and bouzouki
- JP Cormier – fiddle, banjo on track 2, 3, 7
- Thom Swift – resonator guitar on track 3
- Sara DeLong Gunning – harmony vocals on track 10
- Sing It Louder Choir – John Parker, Julie Gunning, and Sara DeLong Gunning

=== Production ===
- Dave Gunning – producer, recording, mixing, mastering
- JP Cormier – assistant producer
- Jamie Robinson – assistant producer
- A Man Called Wrycraft – art direction, design and layout
