= Gençay (surname) =

Gençay is a Turkish surname. Notable people with the surname include:

- Ali Gençay (1905–1957), Turkish footballer
- Ramazan Gençay (1961–2018), Turkish-born Canadian economist

== See also ==
- Gencay (given name)
