= Aycan =

Aycan is a Turkish primarily feminine given name and a surname. Notable people with the name include:

== Given name ==
- Aycan Önel (born 1933), Turkish sprinter
- Aycan Yanaç (born 1998), Turkish-German footballer
- Aycan Yurtsever, Turkish-Canadian physicist

== Surname ==
- Sefer Aycan (born 1963), Turkish physician of public health, academic, former Undersecretary of Turkish Health Ministry and politician

== See also ==
- Aycan, a Danish dance & techno music group
