= Patrick Valduriez =

French computer scientist

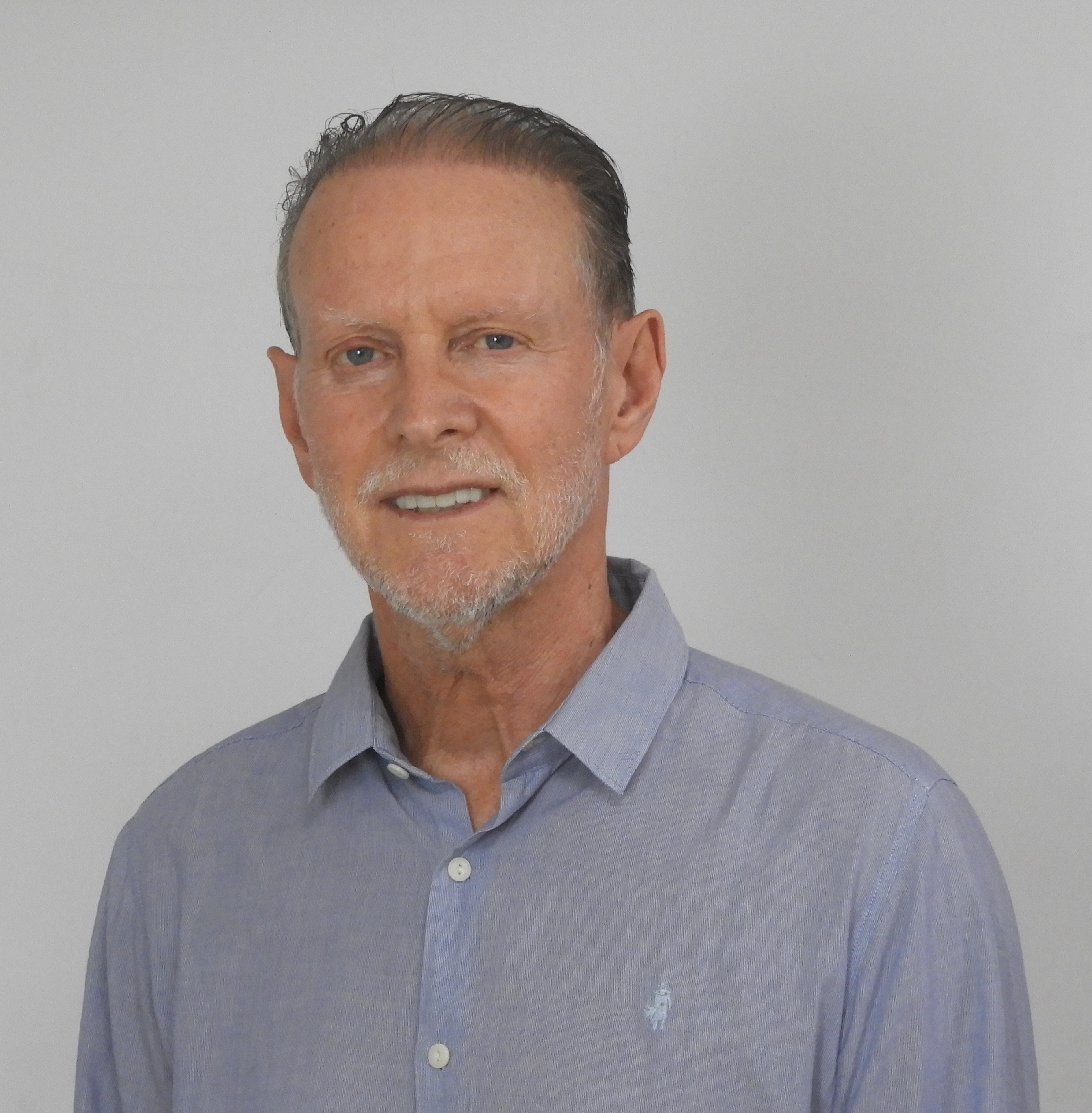
- Valduriez in 2023
- Born: May 12, 1955 (age 71); Calais, France
- Citizenship: French
- Education: Pierre et Marie Curie University (MSc, PhD)
- Known for: Distributed and parallel data management
- Awards: ACM Fellow, 2012; AAIA Fellow, 2024
- Scientific career
- Workplaces: Inria
- Academic advisors: Georges Gardarin
- Website: https://www-sop.inria.fr/members/Patrick.Valduriez/

Patrick Valduriez (born 12 May 1955) is a French computer scientist working in the area of data science, in particular on distributed and parallel data management. Valduriez is a researcher at Inria, the French Institute for Research in Computer Science and Automation.

== Early life and education ==
Valduriez was born in Calais, France. After completing a bachelor's degree in computer science and technology at University of Lille in 1975, he obtained a master's degree in computer science at Pierre et Marie Curie University in Paris in 1977. Then, he worked for two years as a programmer for the French Ministry of Cooperation in Cotonou, Bénin. Back in France, he completed a PhD in computer science on parallel data processing under the supervision of Professor Georges Gardarin at Pierre et Marie Curie University and Inria in 1981.

== Career ==
After his doctoral degree, Valduriez obtained a position as junior researcher at Inria in 1982. In 1985, he joined Microelectronics and Computer Technology Corporation (MCC), to work on the Bubba parallel database system. There, he invented the concept of join indices, which has been used by relational database systems to improve the performance of complex queries involving joins between large tables. In mid 1989, he returned to Inria as a senior researcher, where he successively created and led three teams: Rodin in Rocquencourt in 1990, Atlas in Nantes in 2002, and Zenith in Montpellier in 2012. A major outcome of the Zenith team has been the Pl@ntNet citizen science platform for plant identification.

Since 2019, Valduriez has been the chief scientific officer at LeanXcale, a company that develops a next-generation SQL database system. He is also the scientific director of the Inria-Brasil international partnership, and a collaborator at LNCC, Petropolis, Brazil.

Valduriez's research is on data science, focusing on large-scale data distribution and parallel processing of big data.

== Books ==
Valduriez coauthored several major books on data management.

- Principles of Distributed Database Systems (1991) with M. Tamer Özsu
- Principles of Distributed Database Systems, second edition (1996) with M. Tamer Özsu
- Principles of Distributed Database Systems, third edition (2011) with M. Tamer Özsu
- Principles of Distributed Database Systems, fourth edition (2020) with M. Tamer Özsu
- Relational Databases and Knowledge Bases (1988) with Georges Gardarin
- Analysis and Comparison of Relational Database Systems (1989) with Georges Gardarin
- Object Technology: Concepts and Methods (1997) with Mokrane Bouzeghoub and Georges Gardarin

== Awards ==
Valduriez received the best paper award at the 26th International Conference on Very Large Data Bases (VLDB 2000) and the best paper award at the 31st international conference on Database and Expert Systems Applications (DEXA 2020).

He was awarded the 1993 IBM scientific prize in Computer Science in France and the Innovation Award from Inria and the French Academy of Sciences. He has been an Association for Computing Machinery (ACM) Fellow since 2012, an Asia-Pacific Artificial Intelligence Association (AAIA) Fellow since 2024, and a Trustee Emeritus of the VLDB Endowment since 1998.
