= Great Canadian Song Quest =

Canadian songwriting contest

Great Canadian Song Quest is a Canadian songwriting contest, presented by CBC Music. The competition has been presented in three editions to date, in 2009, 2010 and 2013.

== 2009 edition ==
For the inaugural installation of Great Canadian Song Quest 13 Canadian musical artists, one from each province and territory, were asked to write a song about a location in their home province which was selected by a listener vote.

The resulting songs subsequently aired in a special presentation on the network, and were released to iTunes as a compilation album.

The competition was announced on September 7, 2009, and officially launched on September 28. Promoted primarily by Tom Allen's Radio 2 Morning and Rich Terfry's Radio 2 Drive, the first phase of the contest asked listeners to nominate a location in their province on the network's website. Listeners could then use various online tools, including Twitter, Facebook, online photo and video galleries and Blogger or WordPress blogs, to create a promotional campaign for their nominee.

In the second phase, listeners were provided with a shortlist of songwriters from each province, and were asked to vote on which artist would be chosen to write a song about their province's winning location.

The winning artists and locations were announced on October 26. The songs premiered on a network broadcast, and were released in album form on CBC Records and iTunes, on November 23.

All of the artists except Wainwright also performed their songs in a live concert at Toronto's Glenn Gould Studio theatre on December 15; Wainwright was unable to attend because she had recently given birth to her first child. The concert was aired on Radio 2's Canada Live in January 2010.

Chantal Kreviazuk's song, "In Waskada Somewhere", faced some controversy when she revealed in an interview with the Winnipeg Free Press that as she was unfamiliar with the town, she simply substituted the town's name into the lyrics of a song she had already written before the contest began. Martha Wainwright's contribution, "Four Black Sheep in the Night", also faced some early criticism for seemingly lacking an obvious connection to the location she had been given to write about, the Black Sheep Inn in Wakefield.

=== Track listing ===
1. Hey Rosetta!, "Old Crow Black Night Stand Still" (Gros Morne National Park, Newfoundland and Labrador)
2. Joel Plaskett, "On the Rail" (Cabot Trail, Nova Scotia)
3. Catherine MacLellan, "Singing Sands" (Singing Sands Beach, Prince Edward Island)
4. David Myles, "Don't Drive Through" (Hopewell Rocks, New Brunswick)
5. Martha Wainwright, "Four Black Sheep in the Night" (Black Sheep Inn in Wakefield, Quebec)
6. Hawksley Workman, "Where They Left it Wild" (Algonquin Park, Ontario)
7. Chantal Kreviazuk, "In Waskada Somewhere" (Waskada, Manitoba)
8. The Deep Dark Woods, "Charlie's (Is Coming Down)" (Good Time Charlie's in Regina, Saskatchewan)
9. Jay Sparrow, "The Ballad of Mary White" (Badlands, Alberta)
10. Oh Susanna, "Tough City" (Tofino, British Columbia)
11. Lucie Idlout, "Road to Nowhere" (Road to Nowhere in Iqaluit, Nunavut)
12. Dana Sipos, "Time Before Bones" (pingos of Tuktoyaktuk, Northwest Territories)
13. Kim Barlow, "Dawson City Loves You Back" (Dawson City, Yukon)

== 2010 edition ==
A second edition of the competition was announced in September 2010. In response to some criticism that the 2009 contest resulted in an almost entirely folk rock-based album which seemingly overlooked other genres of music, artists for 2010 were preselected in advance to ensure a more diverse roster, although the song topics were still chosen by listener vote.

The theme of the 2010 compilation is roads. Nominations were open until September 21; following that, a voting period from September 22 to October 1 selected the winning road from each province, with the resulting songs scheduled for release as an album on October 22.

Notably, two of Canada's three territories ended up with unconventional choices. In Nunavut, which has comparatively few conventional roads to choose from, the winning road was the very same topic, Iqaluit's "Road to Nowhere", that had been the subject of Lucie Idlout's song in the 2009 competition, while in the Northwest Territories, the winning "road" was a river.

=== Track listing ===
1. Corb Lund, "The West Just Fades Away" (Highway 22 in Alberta)
2. Hannah Georgas, "Drive" (Freedom Highway in British Columbia)
3. Keri Latimer, "Mountain Road" (Mountain Road off the Yellowhead Highway in Manitoba)
4. Thom Swift, "Take a Drive" (Saint John River Scenic Route in New Brunswick)
5. Chris Kirby, "Free Man" (Viking Trail in Newfoundland and Labrador)
6. Leela Gilday, "Safe Passage" (Mackenzie River in the Northwest Territories)
7. Hopeful Monster, "End of the Road (Can't Believe It's Over Now)" (Trunk Road 1 in Nova Scotia)
8. Madeleine Allakariallak, "Highway Free" (Road to Nowhere in Iqaluit, Nunavut)
9. Jully Black, "At the Roncies" (Roncesvalles Avenue in Toronto, Ontario)
10. Two Hours Traffic, "Great Migration" (Dixon Road in Breadalbane, Prince Edward Island)
11. Cœur de pirate, "La Reine" (Queen Street in Sherbrooke, Quebec)
12. Jason Plumb, "Red Coat Trail" (Highway 13 in Saskatchewan)
13. Brandon Isaak, "My Home Town" (Alaska Highway in Yukon)

== 2013 edition ==
For the 2013 edition of the contest, CBC Music partnered with Hockey Night in Canada for a contest to identify "Canada's next great hockey song". Unlike the format in earlier years, musicians were not preselected – instead, any musician across Canada who wished to enter the contest was invited to upload a song to the competition's website. Over 1,000 entries were received, which were then adjudicated by a panel of judges and submitted to a listener vote over the late fall of 2013, with entries narrowed down to the "Top 50" and "Top 10" as the competition progressed.

The prize was a studio session with Joel Plaskett to record the song, with the track to be featured in the prime-time montage opening Hockey Night in Canada on January 18, 2014, as well as a trip to Lloydminster to perform live at the Scotiabank Hockey Day in Canada concert.

On January 1, 2014, during the 2014 NHL Winter Classic, Dave Gunning and David Francey's "A Game Goin' On" was announced as the winner of the competition. The second-place finisher was "For the Love of the Game" by The Puckhogs, a one-off collaboration between Sudbury musicians Sean Barrette, Chris Leblanc and Brent Wohlberg. The remaining top ten finishers were Harlan Pepper, Francis Arsenault, Jon Abrams, Cassandra, Kenn Coutu, Willhorse, Annex and The Dusters.
