= Aerialists =

Canadian folk music band

Aerialists are a Canadian folk music band based in British Columbia, whose music blends Irish, Scottish and Norwegian folk styles with progressive rock and jazz influences. They are most noted for their 2024 album I Lost My Heart on Friday, which received a Juno Award nomination for Traditional Roots Album of the Year at the Juno Awards of 2026.

The group's core members, harpist Màiri Chaimbeul, fiddler Elise Boeur and guitarist Adam Iredale-Gray, formed the band in 2014 while studying at the Berklee College of Music. They released a self-titled debut album in 2016, and followed up in 2017 with the album Group Manoeuvre. They received a Canadian Folk Music Award nomination for New/Emerging Artist of the Year at the 14th Canadian Folk Music Awards in 2018.

In 2020 they released Dear Sienna, and won the CFMA for Pushing the Boundaries at the 16th Canadian Folk Music Awards in 2021.

I Lost My Heart on Friday was released in fall 2024 on Fiddlehead Records.
