= The Oot n' Oots =

Canadian band

The Oot n' Oots are a Canadian kids' folk-rock band from Kelowna, British Columbia. They are most noted for their album Ponderosa Bunchgrass and the Golden Rule, which was a Juno Award nominee for Children's Album of the Year at the Juno Awards of 2022.

The band consists of brothers Gabe, Matthew, Ari, and Ezra Cipes, along with Ezra's daughter Ruth on lead vocals.

They released their debut album, Songs and Tales from the Great Blue Whale, in 2016, and received a nomination for Children's Artist of the Year at the 2017 Western Canadian Music Awards. They followed up in 2018 with Electric Jellyfish Boogaloo, which was a Canadian Folk Music Award nominee for Children's Album of the Year at the 14th Canadian Folk Music Awards, and with Ponderosa Bunchgrass and the Golden Rule in 2021.
