= Shane Simpson (musician) =

- Origin: Ottawa, Ontario, Canada
- Genres: Jazz
- Occupation: Guitarist
- Instrument: Guitar
- Website: www.shanesimpson.com

Shane Simpson is a Canadian jazz guitarist from Ottawa, Ontario. Simpson is a musician, guitar instructor, record producer and audio engineer. He performs technically demanding fingerstyle-jazz compositions.

== Musical career ==
Simpson attended the jazz program at Humber College in Toronto and in 2000 Simpson started the "Shane Simpson Band" that included Lynn Hanson. Since early 2004, Simpson has toured with three-time Juno Award winner David Francey.

=== Debut album ===
The band's debut album "Sketches", which was a fusion of blues, jazz, flamenco, and bluegrass music. The song "Not Talking At All" was chosen by the members of Blue Rodeo to be included in a "Best of the New Music Network" compilation CD.

=== Second album ===
Simpson's second release, More Electric appeared on the television broadcast on Rogers Television "Front Row Centre." The where song "Nowhere Near" became one of the 16 winning songs in Canada to appear in Canadian Music magazine's "Great Canadian Talent Search." Stacey Board's review of "more electric" in musesmuse.com praises Simpson's "versatile guitar playing" and says that he "...did an excellent job of self-producing this CD", which has "...captured great energy in each song." However, Board states that "[h]is lyrics though are lost on me. They are kind of free form imagery that obviously connect for him emotionally but don't connect for me."

=== Third album ===
In 2004, Paul Bourdeau recorded the album "Wild Rice", which was inspired by Tony Rice's music. Simpson and Bourdeau's jazz-grass guitar-duo playing was reviewed in the November 2004 copy of Acoustic Guitar. C. Michael Bailey’s review of Wild Rice in AllAboutJazz.com calls it “...a damn fine recording of two very talented and very different guitar players.” Bailey calls Simpson’s playing “finesse-oriented”, and says that the album will appeal to fans of David Grisman, Bela Fleck, Tony Rice, Jerry Douglas, and Nickel Creek.

=== Recent activities ===
In 2006, Ottawa Life Magazine included Shane Simpson in the magazine’s “Ottawa’s top 50" list for 2006, a list of the top fifty Ottawans in the fields of “medicine, law, business, the arts, writers, architects, politics and media” (of which only the top ten are numbered). The paragraph on Simpson called him “The Fred Astaire of the Fretboard” and states that his articles on music and guitar transcriptions appear regularly in leading guitar publications.

== Discography ==
- Sketches (2001)
- More Electric (2002)
- Wild Rice (2004)
- The First Set - Live From Folk Alley (2006 as guitarist for David Francey)
- Hi-Phi (2006 performance with James Cohen)

== Instructional ==
- Shane Simpson - Jazz Guitar (DVD)
