= Malins Plaisirs =

Studio album by Genticorum
- Released: 2004
- Genre: Traditional
- Length: 54:49
- Label: Roues Et Archets (Canada)

Genticorum chronology
Le Galarneau	Malins Plaisirs	La Bibournoise

Malins Plaisirs is the second album released by the Canadian trio, Genticorum. Their sound combines traditional (contemporary) Québécois music with several other genres of music. Nominated for a 2006 Juno Award (Canada) and Félix Award (Quebec).

== Track listing ==
1. "les cousinages" - 3:52
2. "cascou" - 4:47
3. "le galant et la belle" - 4:02
4. "l'avocatier" - 3:56
5. "les tisserands" - 4:16
6. "méo grain d'or" - 6:41
7. "la belle en vous aimant" - 2:12
8. "suite de minuit" - 4:07
9. "méthé-métis" - 4:26
10. "le tic-tac du moulin" - 5:42
11. "bonnet d'âne" - 5:31
12. "le berger volage" - 5:17
