= We're All Leaving =

Studio album by Dave Gunning
- Released: September 18, 2012
- Recorded: Wee House of Music Co.
- Genre: Folk
- Length: 41:25
- Label: Wee House of Music Co.
- Producer: Jamie Robinson

Dave Gunning chronology
House For Sale (2007)	We're All Leaving (2012)	...A Tribute To John Allan Cameron (2010)

Professional ratings
Review scores
Source	Rating

We're All Leaving is the sixth studio album by Canadian singer-songwriter Dave Gunning. It was released in 2009 by Wee House of Music.

The album received a nomination in the Folk Recording of the Year category at the 2011 East Coast Music Awards.

== Track listing ==
No.	Title	Length
1.	"Smith's Rock"	4:16
2.	"The Colour of Gone"	3:43
3.	"Made on a Monday"	3:46
4.	"Before the Morning Sun"	4:16
5.	"There's a Song in There"	4:01
6.	"Ashen Town"	3:59
7.	"Big Shoes"	3:16
8.	"Something I'm Missing"	3:49
9.	"As Far As This Town Goes"	3:20
10.	"We're All Leaving"	3:33
11.	"Sorry for the City"	3:32

== Personnel ==
- Dave Gunning – guitars, vocals, harmony vocals
- Jamie Robinson – guitars, guitars, mandolin, programming, harmony vocals, piano on "Big Shoes", organ on "Ashen Town
- Jamie Gatti – acoustic upright bass
- Kim Dunn – organ and piano
- Adam Dowling – drums, percussion
- Julian Marentette – percussion
- Bruce Guthro – vocal on "Something I'm Missing"
- Rose Cousins – vocal on "As Far As This Town Goes"
- Sara DeLong Gunning – harmony vocal on "We're All Leaving"

=== Production ===
- Tim Branton – mastering
- Steven Wark – design
- James Stewart Photography – photography except song booklet pages 3&6, Stockxpert
