= Gencay (given name) =

Gencay is a Turkish given name. Notable people with the name include:

- Gencay Gürün (born 1932), Turkish female art director, diplomat, and politician
- Gencay Kasapçı (1933–2017), Turkish painter

== See also ==
- Gençay (surname)
