= Jay Sparrow =

Canadian musician

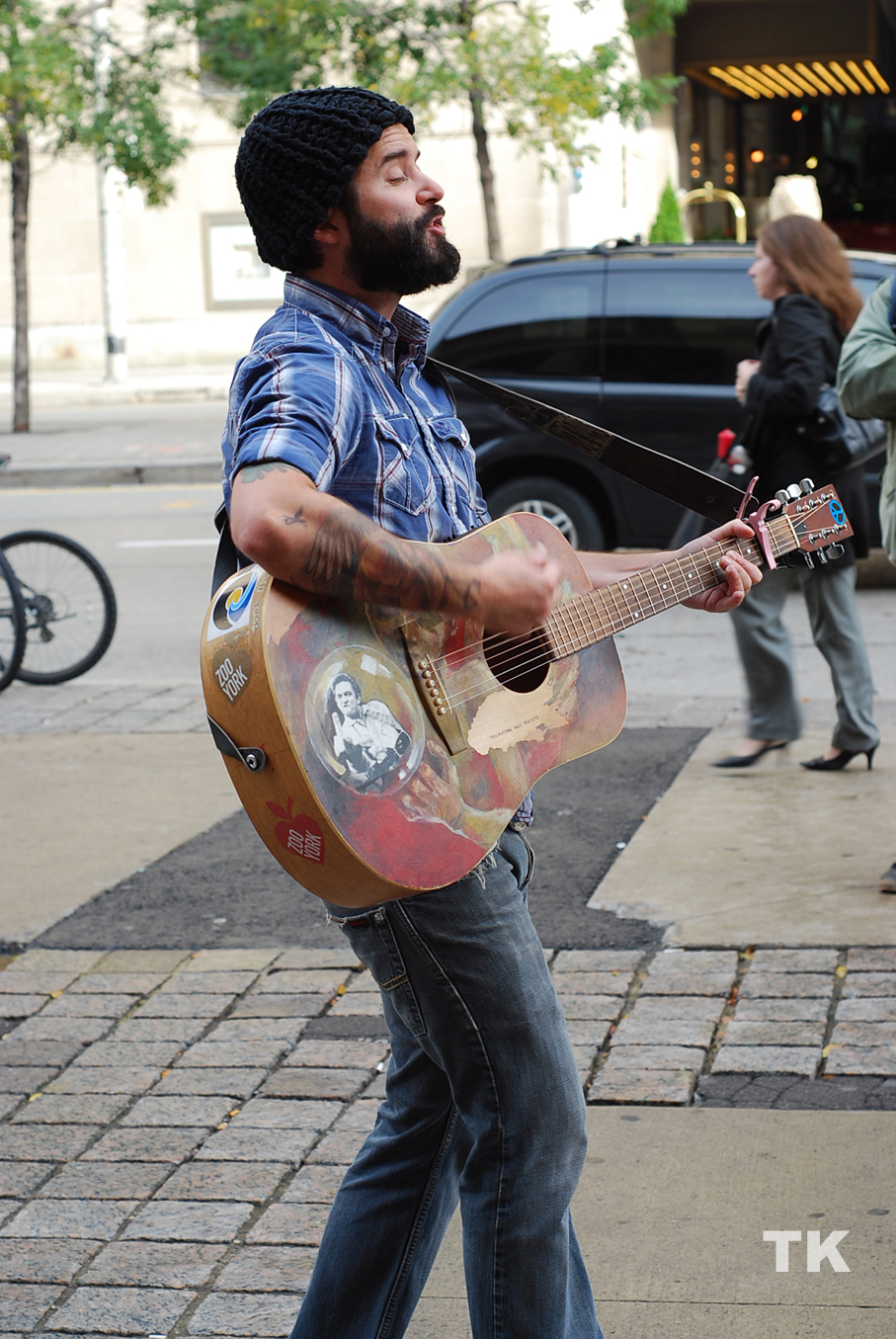
- Sparrow in 2009

Background information
- Origin: Edmonton, Alberta, Canada
- Instruments: Vocals; guitar
- Formerly of: Murder City Sparrows
- Website: jaysparrow.com

Jay Sparrow is a Canadian singer-songwriter and musician.

== Life and career ==
Born in Thunder Bay, Ontario and raised in Edmonton, Alberta, Sparrow was lead singer for the Edmonton punk rock band Murder City Sparrows. He eventually decided to dissolve the band and pursue a different musical direction after realizing that he had no punk rock on his iPod, but instead listened mainly to songwriters such as Steve Earle and Bruce Springsteen.

He released his first solo EP, The Running, in 2009, and followed up with two more EPs, Good Days Gone By in 2009 and The Tempest Line in 2010, before releasing his full-length album debut, In Our Time, in the fall of 2010. He was the winning Alberta songwriter in the 2009 edition of CBC Radio 2's Great Canadian Song Quest, for which he wrote and recorded the song "The Ballad of Mary White".

== Discography ==
=== With Murder City Sparrows ===
Studio albums

- Dead Horse Disco (2009)

EPs

- Murder City Sparrows (2006)

=== Solo ===
Studio albums

- In Our Time (2010)
- White (2012)
- Bluebird (2014)
- Let Wild Dogs Run (2020)
- Hard Eight (2024)

EPs

- The Running (2009)
- Good Days Gone By (2010)
- The Tempest Line (2010)
