= Eliana Cuevas =

Canadian jazz singer

Eliana Cuevas is a Canadian jazz singer, whose music blends jazz with Latin music. She is most noted for her album Golpes y Flores, for which she won the Canadian Folk Music Award for World Solo Artist of the Year at the 14th Canadian Folk Music Awards in 2018.

Born and raised in Caracas, Venezuela, she moved to Canada in 1996 and is currently based in Toronto, Ontario.

== Discography ==
- Cohesion (2002)
- Ventura (2004)
- Vidas (2007)
- Luna Llena (2009)
- Espejo (2013)
- Golpes y Flores (2017)
- El Curruchá (2021)
- Seré Libre (2023)
- Mi Pequeña (2025)
