= Little Miss Higgins =

Little Miss Higgins is the stage name of Jolene Yvonne Higgins, a Canadian folk and acoustic blues singer-songwriter who has performed both as a solo artist and as the lead singer of Little Miss Higgins and the Winnipeg Five.

Born in Brooks, Alberta, and raised both there and in Independence, Kansas, she settled in Nokomis, Saskatchewan after meeting and marrying guitarist Foy Taylor. She modeled her performance style on that of American blues singer Memphis Minnie.

She independently released an EP in 2002 before releasing her full-length debut album The Cobbler Shop Sessions in 2005. She followed up in 2007 with the album Junction City, which was a Juno Award nominee for Blues Album of the Year at the Juno Awards of 2008.

After separating from Taylor and moving to Winnipeg, Manitoba, she teamed up with the Western swing band The F-Holes for the 2013 album Bison Ranch Recording Sessions, which was released as Little Miss Higgins and the Winnipeg Five. The album was recorded in a converted barn on bassist Patrick Leclerc's family farm. Bison Ranch Recording Sessions was a Juno Award nominee for Roots & Traditional Album of the Year – Group at the Juno Awards of 2014.

Her most recent album, My Home, My Heart, was released in 2017, following which Higgins received a Canadian Folk Music Award nomination for Solo Artist of the Year at the 14th Canadian Folk Music Awards in 2018.

In 2020 Higgins announced plans to cease recording music, arguing that the contemporary era of streaming music services have made recorded music no longer a viable source of income for most musicians, although she plans to continue performing live and touring.
