= The Lynnes =

Defunct Canadian folk music duo

The Lynnes, stylized as The LYNNeS, were a Canadian folk music duo, consisting of singer-songwriters Lynne Hanson and Lynn Miles. Hanson and Miles, each of whom was an established solo artist, had previously worked together as guest musicians on each other's albums, and began writing songs together in the mid-2010s before releasing Heartbreak Song for the Radio, their debut album as a duo, in 2018.

They received five Canadian Folk Music Award nominations at the 14th Canadian Folk Music Awards, for Best Contemporary Album, Best Vocal Group, Best Ensemble, Best English-language Songwriter and Best Producer. They won the awards for English Songwriter and Ensemble.
