= Dylan Menzie =

Canadian singer-songwriter

Dylan Menzie is a Canadian singer-songwriter from Belle River, Prince Edward Island.

Menzie released his debut EP, Heather Avenue, in 2013. In 2016, he was a finalist in CBC Radio 2's Searchlight competition with his song "Kenya", which reached No. 1 on the network's chart show The Radio 2 Top 20. He released the album Adolescent Nature that year. In 2017 he received two East Coast Music Award nominations, for Pop Album of the Year and Entertainer of the Year.

In 2018 he was a competitor on CTV's music competition series The Launch, but was not selected as a finalist. Later the same year he released As the Clock Rewinds, consisting primarily of new rerecordings of material from Adolescent Nature. He received a Canadian Folk Music Award nomination for Contemporary Singer of the Year at the 14th Canadian Folk Music Awards.
