= Selim Sesler =

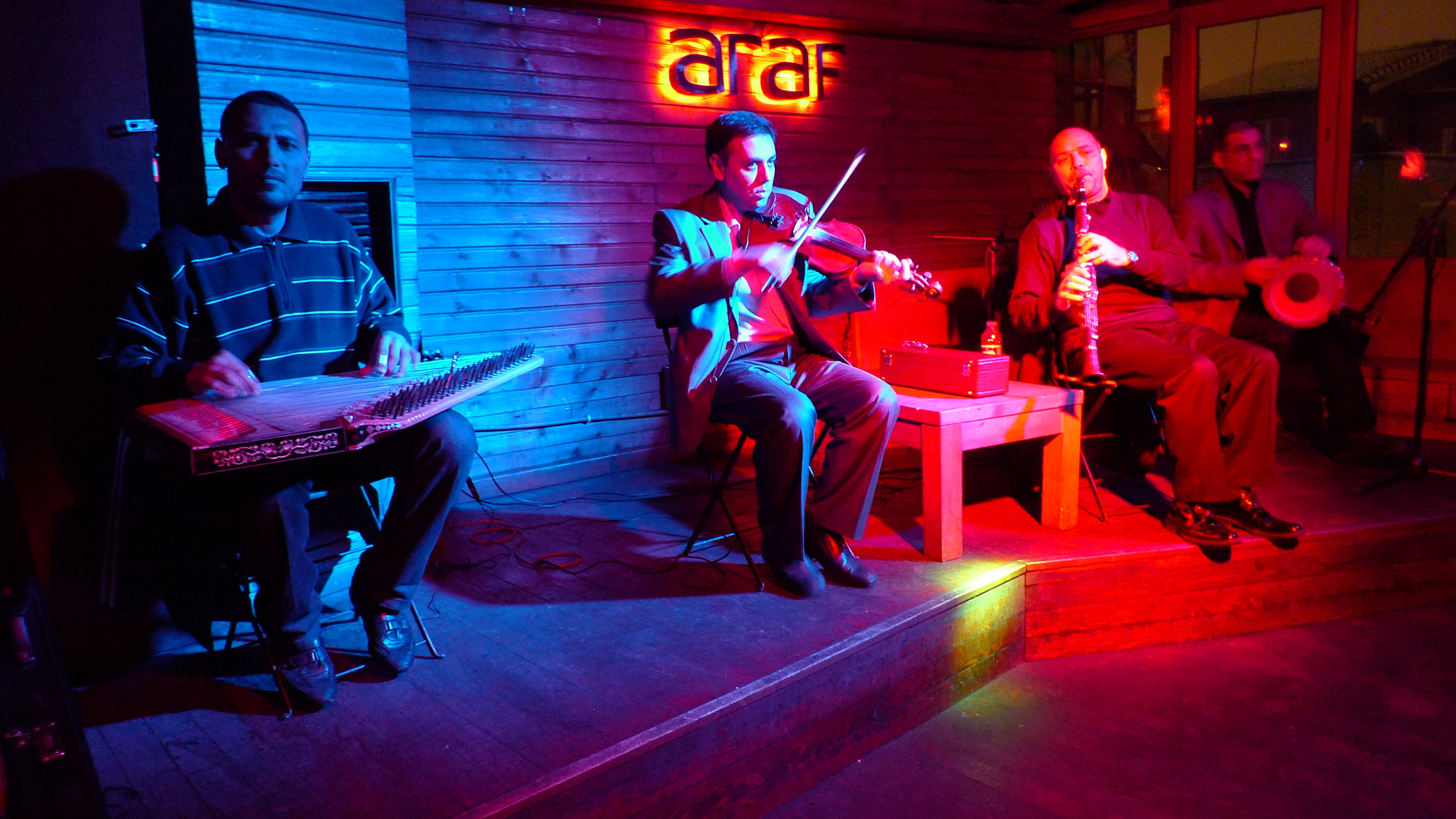
- Selim Sesler (second from right) and his band in 2010

Background information
- Born: 1957; Keşan, Edirne, Turkey
- Died: May 9, 2014 (aged 57) Istanbul, Turkey
- Genre: Romani music
- Occupation: Clarinetist
- Years active: 1971–2012

Selim Sesler (1957 – May 9, 2014) was a Turkish clarinet virtuoso of Romani heritage.

== Early years ==
Selim Sesler was born in Edirne, Turkey in 1957 in the township of Keşan, Yenimescit into a Romani family from Drama, Greece who settled in the village of İbriktepe in İpsala during the population exchange between Greece and Turkey in 1923.

He initially learnt how to play the zurna, a popular Turkish folk instrument. However, in the 1960s, he followed his in friends footsteps and switched over to the clarinet because of its ornate sound. By age 14, he began playing at local weddings and travelling carnivals. He learned to read music in the military.

== Musical career ==
In the 1980s, Sesler moved to Istanbul. There, he joined other Romani bands and honed is music while performing at restaurants, music halls, night clubs, and weddings. He also joined Turkish actor Ferhan Şensoy's musical theatre, which then paved the way for him to record several albums.

In 1997, he met Canadian ethnomusicologist Brenna MacCrimmon at a concert in Istanbul; their friendship eventually blossomed into Brenna's first solo album "Karşılama". The following year, Sesler and Maccrimmon toured across Canada to promote Balkan-Turkish Romani music, in turn earning him international recognition before he'd become famous in Turkey. He would go on to give concerts at Barbican Centre in London, as well as in New York City, Boston, and Chicago. His albums sold in the United States, Europe, Canada, and even in Japan. Fiachra Gibbons of The Guardian called him "the Coltrane of the clarinet".

Over time, he developed a broad repertoire and distinct playing style. Many Romani and non-Romani alike grew to recognize him as the king of Romani music for his improvisations of wedding music and dance melodies. He was re-introduced in Turkey when his music got featured in the Golden Bear-award winning film "Gegen die Wand (Head-On)" (2004) by Turkish-German director Fatih Akın, soon followed by the successful documentary Crossing the Bridge: The Sound of Istanbul (2005).

Sesler's last known performance on record was Minor Empire's Second Nature album.

== Health problems and death ==
In 2005, Sesler was diagnosed with coronary heart disease. Following treatment, he was placed on a waiting list for a heart transplant. In an August 2012 interview, he stated that he'd hoped his transplant "would set him free."

On May 9, 2014, Sesler died at the age of 57 in Istanbul at the hospital he was receiving treatment, and laid to rest in his birthplace of Keşan. Sesler was survived by his wife and three children, all of whom are musicians too

== Albums ==
- Karşılama with Brenna MacCrimmon, 1998
- Keşan'a Giden Yollar (The Road to Keşan) (2000), 1999 - by Kalan Müzik
- Oğlan Bizim Kız Bizim (Anatolian wedding), 2006 - by Doublemoon Records
- Romanes Clarinet, 2007 - by Özlem Müzik
- Second Nature with Minor Empire, 2011
