= Murat Tuncali =

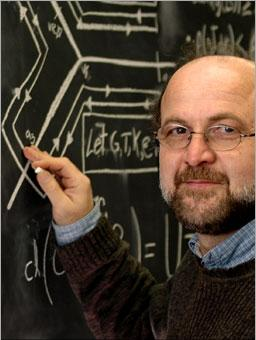

Murat Tuncali (born 1959) is a Mathematics Professor at Nipissing University in North Bay, Ontario. He is also the chair of the Department of Computer Science and Mathematics. He graduated with his Bachelor of Science at Boğaziçi University, in Turkey. He then graduated from University of Saskatchewan with an MSc, and a PhD. He has won many awards over the years, including the Chancellor’s Award for Excellence in Research 1999–2000, Research Achievement Award 2001–2002. He took a break from his position between the months of January and June 2006.
