= Lenka Lichtenberg =

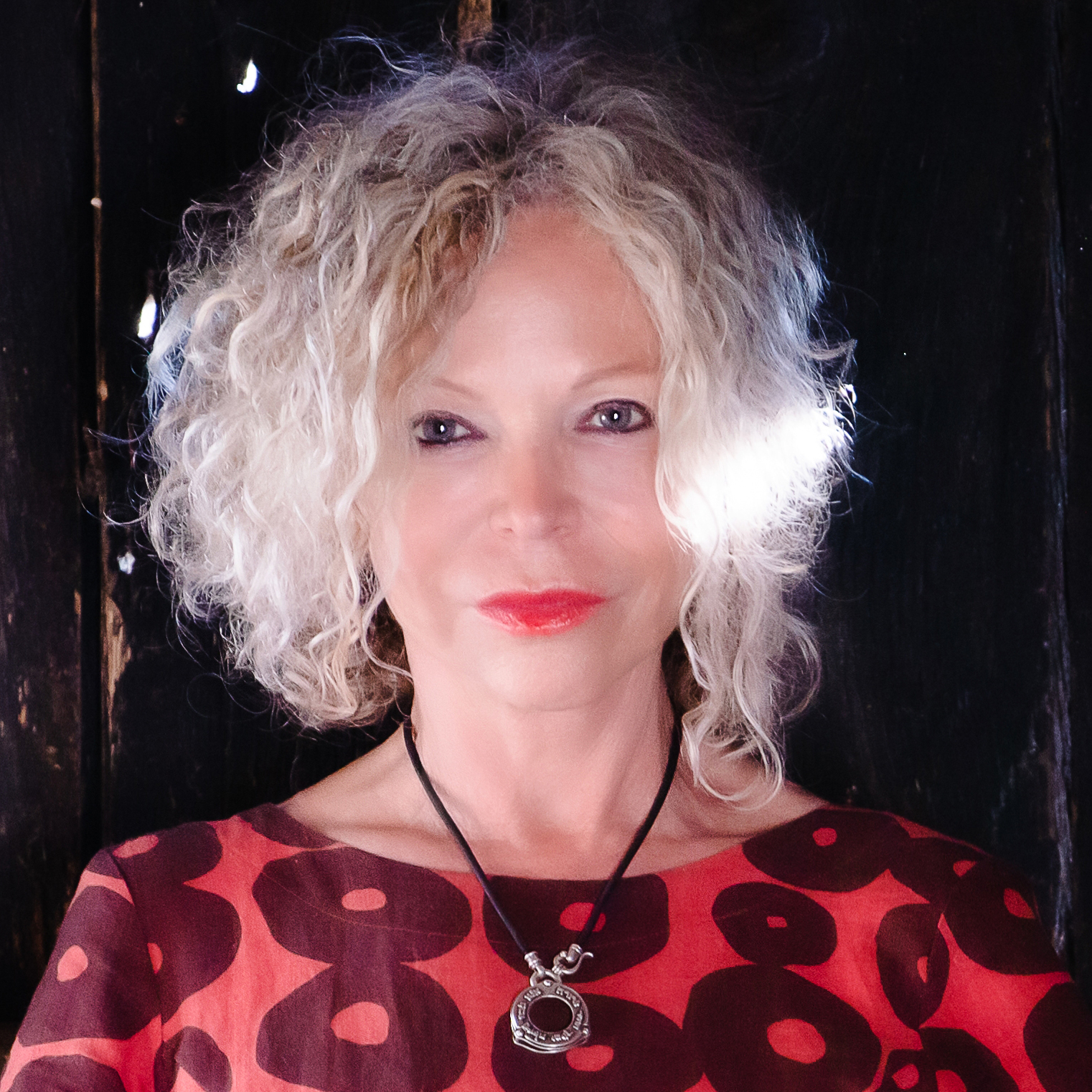

Background information
- Born: 1955 (age 70–71); Prague, Czechoslovakia
- Genres: Yiddish; klezmer; world music; folk; world jazz; cantorial
- Occupations: Composer, singer
- Labels: ARC Music Productions; Six Degrees (digital distribution); Supraphon (digital distribution)
- Website: www.lenkalichtenberg.com

Lenka Lichtenberg (born 1955) is a Canadian singer, composer, songwriter, and cantorial soloist of Czech-Jewish descent. She sings in Czech, English, French, Hebrew, and Yiddish.

== Early life and education ==
She was born in Prague, into a family of Jewish origin. Most of her mother's family was murdered during the Holocaust. At the age of nine, Lichtenberg became an actress at the Music Theatre Semafor in Prague. She moved to Denmark, where she studied music at Aarhus Universitet and worked as a club singer.

In the 1980s, Lichtenberg moved to Canada and settled in Vancouver, where she continued her studies at the University of British Columbia (B.Ed., music, French), and sang in a rock band. She received her master's degree in ethnomusicology at York University in Toronto.

== Career ==
Lichtenberg performs internationally at Jewish culture festivals, folk and world music festivals and concert series. She has released seven solo albums and numerous collaborative projects. She is a regular Shabbat service leader at the Darchei Noam Congregation in Toronto.

Director Jaroslav Hovorka made a documentary film for Czech TV about her, Lenka Lichtenberg: Pisne pro ozivle steny (2011).

== Accolades ==
Lichtenberg has received numerous nominations and awards. In 2008 and 2012 she was the recipient of the Canadian Folk Music Award. Her latest project Thieves of Dreams placed at #36 at the Top 2022 Albums on World Music Charts Europe and won a JUNO Award.

== Discography ==
- 1999 - Deep Inside
- 2003 - Open the Gate
- 2006 - Pashtes with Brian Katz
- 2010 - Fray
- 2012 - Bridges with Roula Said
- 2012 - Songs for the Breathing Walls
- 2013 - Embrace
- 2014 - Lullabies from Exile with Yair Dalal
- 2016- Live in America
- 2017 - Yiddish Journey (Arc Music Productions)
- 2018 - Masaryk (Arc Music Productions)
- 2019 - Lenkkodek with Andrew McPherson
- 2022- Thieves of Dreams
