= Cigdem Eskicioglu =

Turkish-Canadian engineer

- Born: Turkey
- Education: University of Ottawa
- Awards: Senior Industrial Research Chair City of Kelowna’s Mayor’s Environmental Award
- Scientific career
- Workplaces: University of British Columbia

Cigdem Eskicioglu is a Turkish-Canadian engineer, and a professor at the University of British Columbia. She holds a Senior Industrial Research Chair in the School of Engineering at the University of British Columbia.

== Early life and education ==
Eskicioglu was born in Turkey, and spent her first ten years in Istanbul. She cites her experiences in Turkey, including traffic jams and a lack of clean water and air, as what prompted her interest in environmental issues. She completed a Bachelor of Science degree in environmental engineering at the Istanbul Tech University, followed by a PhD and post-doctoral fellowship in environmental engineering at the University of Ottawa.

== Research career ==
Eskicioglu leads the UBC Bioreactor Technology Group at the University of British Columbia's Okanagan campus, where her lab develops wastewater treatment technologies, including waste processing and biological treatment. In 2020, She was appointed as the Senior Industrial Research Chair (IRC), awarded by the Natural Sciences and Engineering Research Council (NSERC) and Metro Vancouver, to conduct research into recovering resources from wastewater sludge, at the School of Engineering at the University of British Columbia. Eskicioglu has been collaborating with Metro Vancouver since 2013, which has yielded a provisional patent on a bioreactor which can create renewable natural gas from wastewater treatment.

Conventional fermentation methods can take several weeks, or months, to generate methane. In collaboration with international groups, Eskicioglu has developed a new waste pre-treatment technique, where common materials in agricultural waste, including Douglas fir bark, can generate methane faster. In addition, Eskicioglu's research has demonstrated that including combinations of metal salts during fermentation can make wastewater treatment safer and less smelly.

Eskicioglu has published over 80 academic papers which have been cited over 2900 times, resulting in an h-index and i10-index of 23 and 43 respectively. She has previously received a Natural Sciences and Engineering Research Council (NSERC) Postgraduate Scholarship, the British Columbia Confederation of University Faculty Associations (CUFA) Early in Career Award (2012) and the City of Kelowna’s Mayor's Environmental Award (2011).

== Selected bibliography ==
- Characterization of soluble organic matter of waste activated sludge before and after thermal pretreatment. C Eskicioglu, KJ Kennedy, RL Droste. Water research 40 (20), 3725–3736. 2006.
- Athermal microwave effects for enhancing digestibility of waste activated sludge. C Eskicioglu, N Terzian, KJ Kennedy, RL Droste, M Hamoda. Water Research 41 (11), 2457–2466. 2007.
- Fate of estrogenic hormones in wastewater and sludge treatment: A review of properties and analytical detection techniques in sludge matrix. H Hamid, C Eskicioglu. Water Research 46 (18), 5813–5833. 2012.
- An overview of construction and demolition waste management in Canada: a lifecycle analysis approach to sustainability. M Yeheyis, K Hewage, MS Alam, C Eskicioglu, R Sadiq. Clean Technologies and Environmental Policy 15 (1), 81–91. 2013.
