= Dave Gunning =

Canadian folk singer-songwriter

- Born: Pictou County, Nova Scotia
- Genres: Folk, Celtic
- Occupations: Musician, singer-songwriter
- Years active: 1997–present
- Labels: Wee House of Music Co.
- Website: davegunning.com

Dave Gunning is a Canadian folk singer-songwriter born in Pictou County, Nova Scotia. Gunning credits the first live concert he ever observed, a 1981 double bill of John Allan Cameron and Stan Rogers, to be a major driving force in shaping the direction his life would take as a musician.

That show changed my life. I would not be writing and playing folk music if not for seeing that concert and every other John Allan performance in Pictou County.

Over the span of his career, Gunning has released fourteen albums, received a Juno Award nomination and has been awarded two Canadian Folk Music Awards, four Music Nova Scotia Awards and recognized with ten East Coast Music Awards.

He is known for the incorporation of story telling into his live show. In particular, Gunning relates anecdotes of notable characters from Pictou County and performs impressions of musicians that he has worked with over the years.

The track "A Game Goin' On" from Gunning's album No More Pennies was submitted to the Great Canadian Song Quest (2013 edition: Hockey Night In Canada Song Quest). The song was named as a top 10 finalist of the contest. On January 1, 2014, during the NHL Winter Classic "A Game Goin' On" was announced as the winner.

== Discography ==
- Lost Tracks (1996)
- Caught Between Shadows (2000)
- Live (2002)
- Two-Bit World (2004)
- Christmas (2006)
- House For Sale (2007)
- We're All Leaving (2009)
- ...a tribute to John Allan Cameron (2010)
- Christmas Too (2011)
- No More Pennies (2012)
- Lift (2015)
- Two with J.P. Cormier as Gunning & Cormier (2017)
- Up Against The Sky (2019)
- The Same Storm (2022)

== Awards and achievements ==
International Folk Music Awards:

- 2020 Song of the Year Nomination (All That's Yet To Come)

Juno Awards:

- 2012 Roots & Traditional Solo Album of the Year Nomination (...a tribute to John Allan Cameron)

Canadian Folk Music Awards:

- 2023 English Songwriter of the Year Nomination (The Same Storm)
- 2023 Solo Artist of the Year Nomination (The Same Storm)
- 2020 Contemporary Album of the Year Nomination (Up Against The Sky)
- 2020 Songwriter of the Year Nomination
- 2020 Contemporary Singer of the Year Nomination (Up Against The Sky)
- 2020 Solo Artist of the Year Nomination (Up Against The Sky)
- 2011 Traditional Singer of the Year – Winner (...a tribute to John Allan Cameron)
- 2011 Best New Emerging Artist of the Year – Winner

East Coast Music Awards:

- 2019 Folk Recording of the Year - Winner (Gunning & Cormier - Two)
- 2017 Songwriter of the Year Nomination (Lift)
- 2017 Folk Recording of the Year Nomination (Lift)
- 2017 Entertainer of the Year Nomination
- 2014 Solo Recording of the Year – Winner (No More Pennies)
- 2014 Songwriter of the Year – Winner (These Hands from No More Pennies)
- 2014 Entertainer of the Year Nomination
- 2014 Video of the Year, These Hands Nomination (Director: Scott Simpson)
- 2013 Song of the Year – Winner (These Hands from No More Pennies)
- 2013 Entertainer of the Year Nomination
- 2013 Folk Recording of the Year Nomination (No More Pennies)
- 2012 Entertainer of the Year Nomination
- 2011 Roots Traditional Solo Recording of the Year – Winner (...a tribute to John Allan Cameron)
- 2011 Producer of the Year – Winner (...a tribute to John Allan Cameron)
- 2011 Folk Recording of the Year (We’re All Leaving) & Entertainer of the Year Nomination
- 2010 Male Solo Recording of the Year & FACTOR Recording of the Year Nomination (We’re All Leaving)
- 2010 Songwriter of the Year Nomination (Made On A Monday)
- 2009 Entertainer of the Year Nomination
- 2008 Male Solo Recording of the Year – Winner (House For Sale)
- 2008 Folk Recording of the Year – Winner (House For Sale)
- 2006 Male Artist of the Year & Album of the Year Nomination (Two-Bit World )
- 2005 Folk Recording of the Year – Winner (Two-Bit World)
- 2005 Male Artist of the Year Nomination (Two-Bit World)

Music Nova Scotia Awards:

- 2019 Folk Recording of the Year Nomination (Up Against The Sky)
- 2016 Folk Recording of the Year Nomination (Lift)
- 2013 Folk Recording of the Year – Winner (No More Pennies)
- 2011 Roots Traditional Solo Recording of the Year – Winner (...a tribute to John Allan Cameron)
- 2011 Male Artist Recording of the Year Nomination (We're All Leaving)
- 2011 Producer of the Year, Recording Studio of the Year Nomination (Wee House of Music)
- 2010 Folk Recording of the Year, Male Artist of the Year, Entertainer of the Year, SOCAN Songwriter of the Year Nomination (We’re All Leaving)
- 2008 Folk Recording of the Year & Entertainer of the Year Nomination (House For Sale)
- 2005 Folk Recording of the Year – Winner (Two-Bit World)
- 2003 Musician of the Year - Winner

Great Canadian Song Quest:

- 2014 CBC Hockey Night In Canada Song Quest - Winner (A Game Goin' On)

International Songwriting Credits:

- 2014 Great American Song Contest – Winner (These Hands)
- 2013 International Songwriting Competition - Semi Finalist (These Hands)
- 2010 Great American Song Contest - Winner (Before The Morning Sun)
- 2009 International Songwriting Competition - Semi Finalist (Before The Morning Sun)
- 2008 Indie International Songwriting Contest - Winner (Hard Workin’ Hands)
- 2008 USA Songwriting Competition - Finalist (Hard Workin’ Hands)
- 2008 International Songwriting Competition - Finalist (Cowboy’s Dream)
- 2008 John Lennon Songwriting Contest - Finalist (Hard Workin’ Hands)
- 2005 International Acoustic Music Awards - Winner (Prince of Pictou)
- 2005 USA Songwriting Competition - Honorable Mention (Prince of Pictou)
