= Melike Erol-Kantarci =

Turkish-Canadian computer scientist

Melike Erol-Kantarci is a Turkish-Canadian computer scientist whose research involves wireless sensor networks, smart grids, the artificial intelligence of things, and 6G wireless communication. She is a full professor in the University of Ottawa School of Electrical Engineering and Computer Science, where she holds a tier 2 Canada Research Chair in Artificial Intelligence-Enabled, Next-Generation Wireless Networks; she also works for Ericsson as Strategic Product Manager for AI in RAN.

== Education and career ==
Erol-Kantarci was a student of computer engineering at Istanbul Technical University, where she received a bachelor's degree in 2001, master's degree in 2004, and Ph.D. in 2009, under the supervision of Sema Oktuğ. Her doctoral studies also included a year as a visiting student at the University of California, Los Angeles, working there with Mario Gerla.

After postdoctoral research at the University of Ottawa, she took an assistant professorship at Clarkson University in 2014, returning to the University of Ottawa as an assistant professor in 2016. In 2019, she was tenured as an associate professor, and given her Canada Research Chair, which was renewed in 2024. She was promoted to full professor in 2023.

She began working for Ericsson in 2022 as Chief Cloud RAN AI\ML Data Scientist, and changed her position there to Strategic Product Manager for AI in RAN in 2024.

== Recognition ==
Erol-Kantarci received a Technical Achievement Award of the IEEE Technical Committee on Smart Grid Communications in 2023. She was named to the 2025 class of IEEE Fellows "for contributions to AI-enabled wireless networks and smart grid communications".
