= Umut Özsu =

Canadian legal scholar

Academic background
- Education: University of Toronto (SJD, LLM, JD, MA), University of Alberta (BA)

Academic work
- Discipline: legal scholar
- Institutions: Carleton University
- Main interests: international law

Umut Özsu is a Canadian legal scholar and professor at Carleton University. Özsu is known for his works on international law.

== Books ==
- Law and Marxist Critique: A Reintroduction (Cheltenham: Edward Elgar, forthcoming)
- Completing Humanity: The International Law of Decolonization, 1960–82 (Cambridge: Cambridge University Press, 2023)
- Formalizing Displacement: International Law and Population Transfers (Oxford: Oxford University Press, 2015)
