= Lynn Miles =

Canadian singer-songwriter (born 1958)

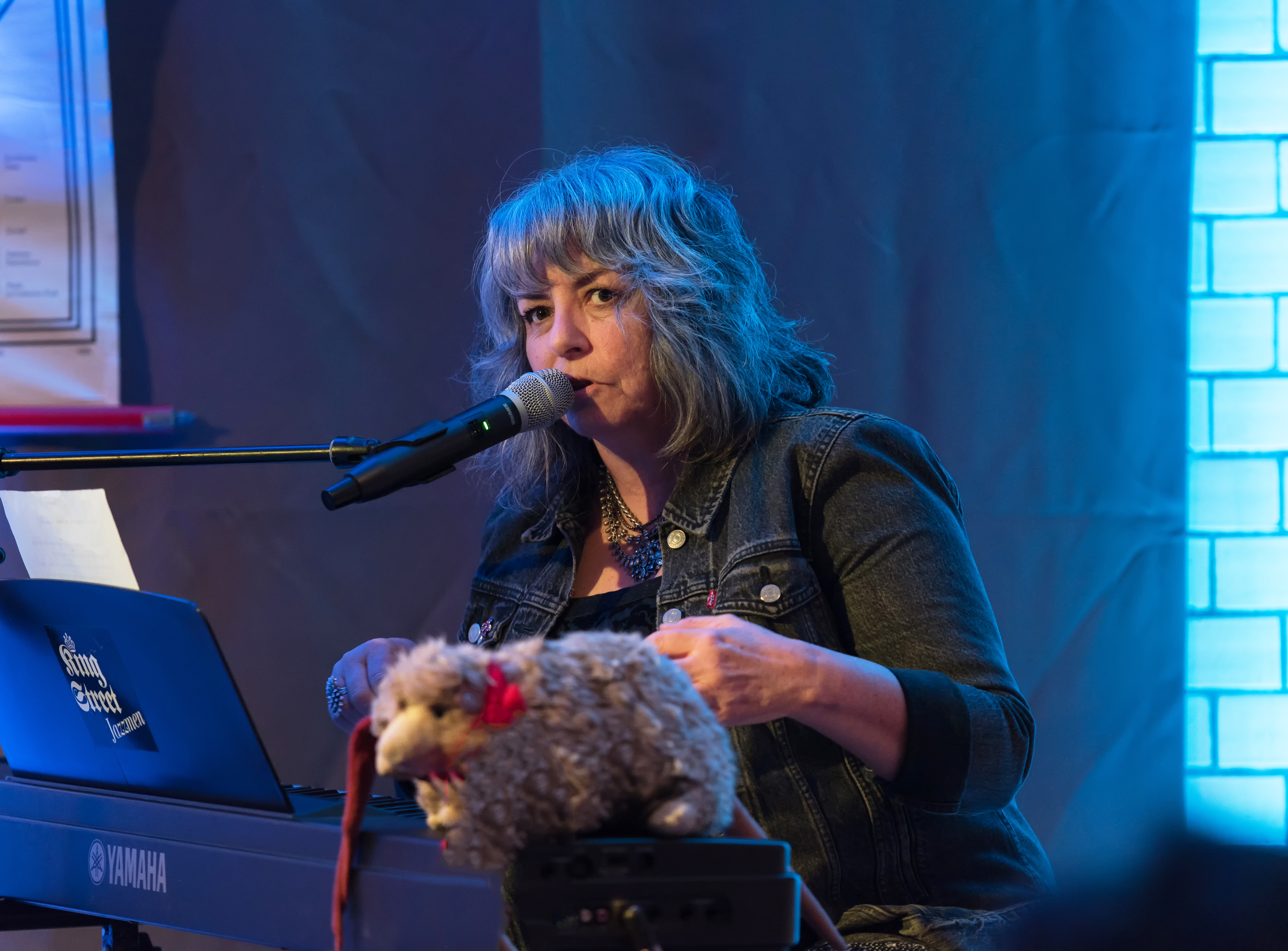

Background information
- Born: 29 September 1958 (age 66); Cowansville, Quebec, Canada
- Origin: Ottawa, Ontario, Canada
- Genres: Country, Folk
- Years active: 1987–present
- Labels: Philo Records, True North, Red House
- Website: LynnMiles.ca

Lynn Miles (born 29 September 1958) is a Canadian singer-songwriter. She has won the Juno Award and three Canadian Folk Music Awards.

== Early life and education ==
Miles was born on 29 September 1958 in the town of Cowansville, Quebec. Her father was a harmonica player and jazz fan while her mother listened to both opera and country music. Miles learned to play the violin, guitar, piano and flute during her school years. She began composing songs at the age of ten and began performing at the age of sixteen. While in her twenties Miles studied voice with a private teacher and classical music history and theory at Carleton University in Ottawa.

== Career ==
Miles became a voice teacher at the Ottawa Folklore Centre. Her first recording of original material was a nine-song demo which she created in 1987. In the early 1990s Miles released a self-titled album plus an additional recording called Chalk This One Up to the Moon. Her composition "Remembrance Day" became part of a nationally televised video created by the Canadian Armed Forces. Miles' 1996 album, Slightly Haunted received favorable reviews in the New York Times and was a Billboard Top Ten Pick of the Year. In 1997 she released the album Night in a Strange Town.

Miles reunited with collaborator and guitarist Ian LeFeuvre for her 2001 album, Unravel, which won the 2003 Juno award for Best Roots & Traditional Album of the Year: Solo. Miles was nominated in 2005 for a Canadian Folk Music Awards. In 2006 Miles recorded the album Love Sweet Love which was released in the U.S. on Red House Records. It was recorded with guitarists Ian LeFeuvre and Keith Glass, drummer Peter Von Althen, John Geggie on bass, James Stephens on violin. It was nominated for a 2006 Juno Award. In 2009, the Art of Time Ensemble featuring Sarah Slean recorded Miles' song, "Black Flowers."

Her 2010 album Fall for Beauty was nominated at the Juno Awards of 2011 in the Roots & Traditional Album of the year category. Miles has re-recorded acoustic versions of her songs in a series called Black Flowers. The first two volumes were produced in 2008 and 2009 on her Cold Girl record label and later re-released by True North Records in 2009. A third volume was released in August 2012. New York Times music critic, John Pareles wrote that Miles' music "makes forlorn feel like a state of grace." In 2014 she produced the Lynne Hanson album River of Sand.

She also collaborates with Hanson in the band project The Lynnes, who released their debut album Heartbreak Song for the Radio in 2018.

== Personal life ==
Miles lived in Ottawa and Nashville, Tennessee before moving to Los Angeles in 1997. She moved to Austin, Texas before returning to her home country of Canada.

== Discography ==
- Lynn Miles, (cassette demo) 1987
- Chalk This One Up to the Moon, 1991
- Slightly Haunted, 1996
- Night in a Strange Town, 1997
- Unravel, 2001
- Love Sweet Love, 2006
- Black Flowers, Volume 1, 2008
- Lynn Miles: Live at the Chapel, 2009
- Black Flowers, Volume 2, 2009
- Fall for Beauty, 2010
- Black Flowers, Volume 3, 2012
- Downpour, 2013
- Black Flowers, Volume 4, 2014
- Winter, 2015
- Road (with Keith Glass), 2016
- We'll Look for Stars, 2020
- TumbleWeedyWorld, 2023

== Videography ==
- Lynn Miles: Live at the Chapel, (DVD) 2007

== See also ==
- Music of Canada
- List of Canadian musicians
