= Genticorum =

Musical group

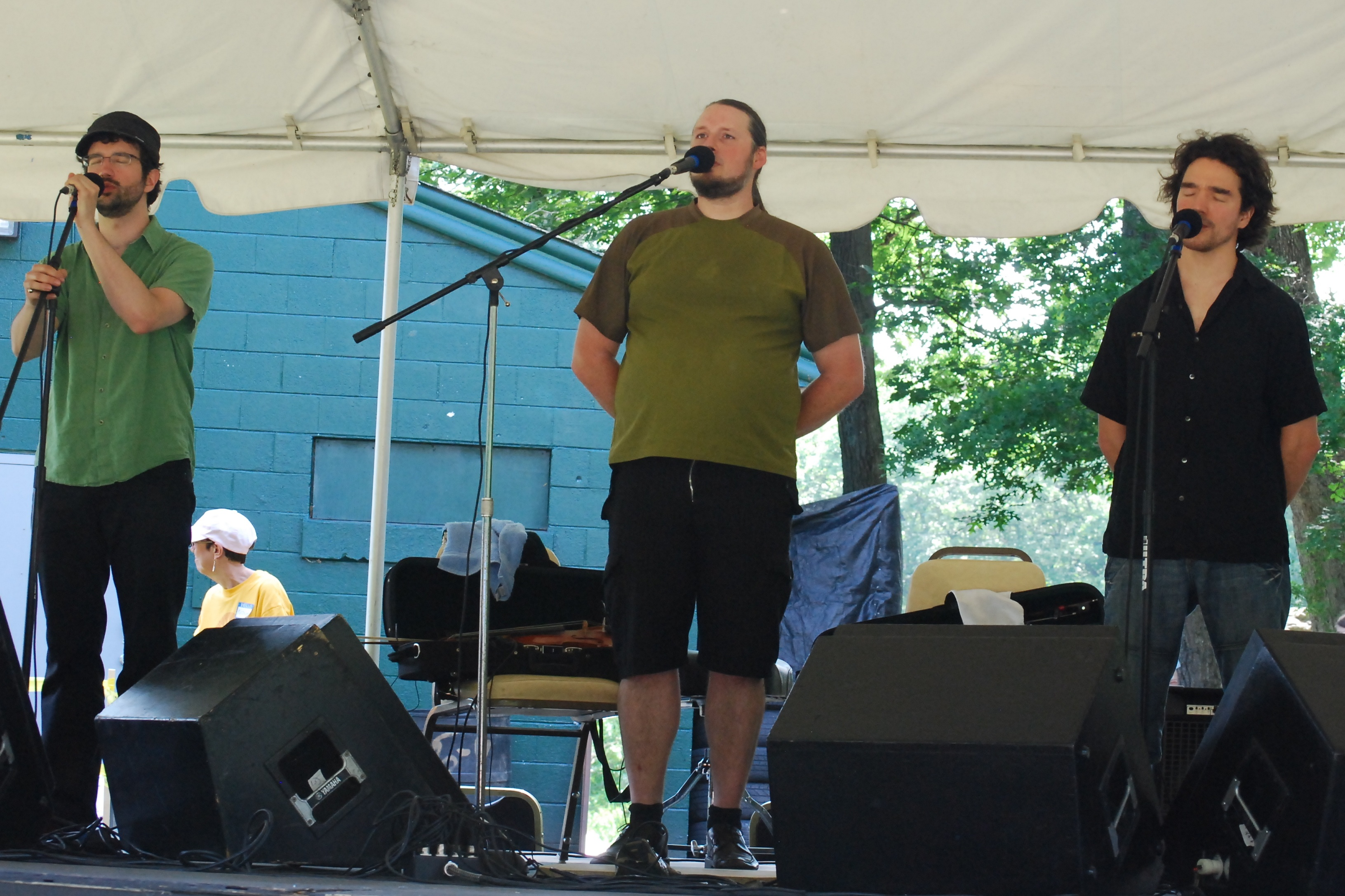
- Genticorum performing in June 2011

Background information
- Origin: Montreal, Quebec, Canada
- Genres: Folk, World music, Celtic music
- Years active: 2000–present
- Label: Roues Et Archets (Canada)
- Members: Yann Falquet; Pascal Gemme; Nicholas Williams
- Past members: Alexandre de Grosbois-Garand
- Website: genticorum.com

Genticorum (/dʒɒntiːkəˈrʌm/ jon-tee-kə-RUM) is a popular traditional Québécois musical trio based in Montreal, Quebec, Canada. Members are Pascal Gemme (fiddle, and vocals), Yann Falquet (guitar, jaw harp, and vocals), and Nicholas Williams (wooden flute, accordion), replacing Alexandre de Grosbois-Garand (wooden flute, bass, and vocals). Each member additionally provides percussion by clogging. The band formed in the autumn of 2000, and as of 2011, have released four albums all on Roues Et Archets, an independent record label.

Genticorum fuses modern composition and elements from classic folk and Celtic music. Their musical scores are original, largely based on Gemme's repertoire of fiddle tunes, while their lyrics are often traditional.

== History ==
Genticorum was formed by three musicians who found a love for French Canadian fiddle tunes, and folk music, performing a melding of such a variety of mostly acoustic musical genres that their sound has been described as world music. They perform their own compositions weaving their own arrangements with traditional fiddle music, and Sing Out! magazine notes that the flute is featured on most of their tracks. Genticorum gained their name from a word which Gemme remembers his grandfather singing, although he is unsure of the meaning. He believes it carries with it an association with the words gentle and quorum.

All lyrics to their songs are in French. Despite touring primarily in English-speaking countries, they have toured outside North America, Australia, and Europe to countries as diverse as Egypt and Malaysia. The band members have used this exposure to integrate a variety of musical elements to their unique sound.

The group is active in Quebec's traditional dance scene, and offers custom tailored bilingual workshops on fiddle, flute, guitar, songs and foot-tapping. Genticorum's 2005 second album, Malins Plaisirs won the Canadian Folk Music Award for Best Ensemble and was nominated for a Juno and the Félix Awards.

Genticorum's La Bibournoise was nominated for the 8th Annual Independent Music Awards for World Traditional Album of the year.

== Members ==
Yann Falquet has his bachelor's degree in jazz and has explored numerous styles of acoustic music. His influences are varied, including the accompanists of Brittany, Scandinavia, Ireland and North America among others. He toured for three years with the Edmonton based Celtic/world group The McDades.

Nicholas Williams is a musician active in the traditional music scenes of Québec and New England. His flute playing draws from Irish and Scottish traditions, as well as his studies of classical North Indian music. After completing a BFA in world music and composition at York University, Nicholas moved to Québec in 2000, where he developed his work with Québécois musical traditions. He is also an accordion and piano player. He has been a member of the band Crowfoot since 2005 and performs with fiddler Laura Risk and in the Alex Kehler & Nicholas Williams duo.

Pascal Gemme has a degree in big-band arrangement and classical and jazz guitar. His grandfather inspired him to take up the fiddle, and he has since both given master-classes in the United States and taught at the École des Arts de la Veillée in Montreal. He is responsible for most of Genticorum's arrangements, and served the same role for the Québécois/Celtic/world show Chantier by Zeugma. Similarly, he is currently working as a producer and session musician for various projects involving commercial radio and television.

== Past members ==
Alexandre de Grosbois-Garand started his musical career as a funk-Latin-jazz composer/arranger and bass player. A fascination with folk music led him to discover the wooden flute in 1997, which he now teaches at the École des Arts de la Veillée in Montreal and at the Cégep of Joliette. He has played with a variety of bands including the folk-pop group Perdu l’Nord for which he composed and played bass and flute.

== Discography ==
- Le Galarneau – 2002
- Malins Plaisirs – 2005
- La Bibournoise – 2008
- Nagez Rameurs – 2011
- Enregistré Live – 2013
- Avant l'orage – 2018
- Septembre (EP) – 2020
- Octobre (EP) – 2020
- Novembre (EP) – 2020
- Au coeur de l'aube – 2023
