= Lynne Hanson =

Canadian singer-songwriter

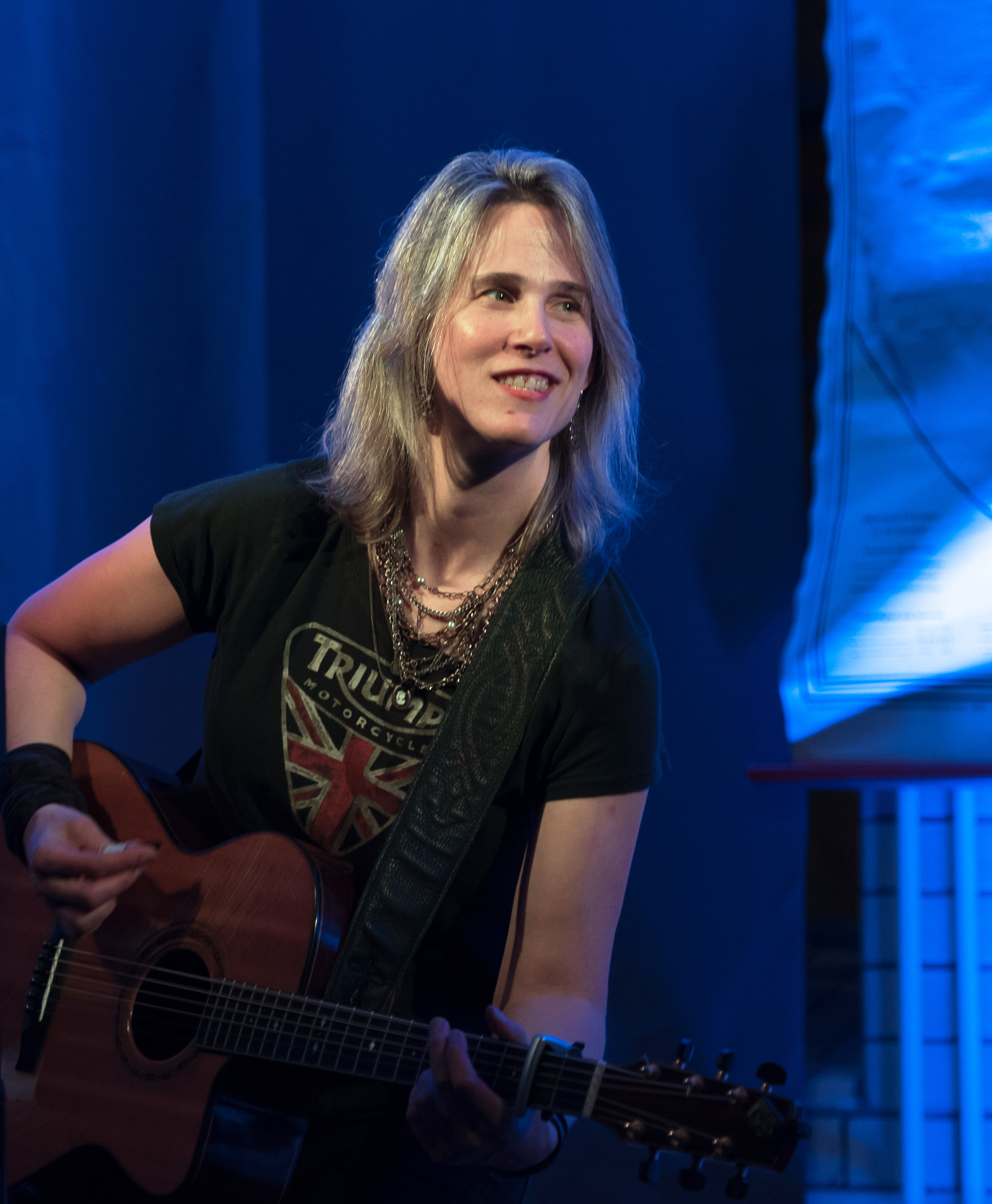
- Hanson performing in 2018

Background information
- Origin: Ottawa, Ontario, Canada
- Genres: Americana, country, roots music, singer songwriter
- Occupation: songwriter
- Instruments: Vocals, guitar, porchboard
- Label: Independent
- Website: lynnehanson.com

Lynne Hanson is a Canadian singer-songwriter based in Ottawa, Ontario who has released ten solo albums and has toured internationally.

== Biography ==
After performing with Shane Simpson from 2000 to 2005, she launched her solo songwriting career with the release of her first album, Things I Miss in 2006, followed by Eleven Months (2008) and Once the Sun Goes Down (2010). Her fourth studio album River of Sand was produced by Juno-award-winning songwriter Lynn Miles, and released in September 2014 on Continental Song City by the Dutch record label CRS.

In 2010 she was the winner of the Colleen Peterson Songwriting Award for her song "Rest of My Days" and in 2009 was nominated for a Canadian Folk Music Award in the New/Emerging Artist category. Hanson was a New Folk Finalist at the prestigious Kerrville Folk Festival in Texas in 2009 and again in 2019.

She has toured across Canada and internationally as a solo artist. She has toured in Europe and the Southern US with fellow Canadian songwriter Lynn Miles, and the United Kingdom and Ireland as support for Grammy-nominated Nashville based songwriters Steve Forbert in October 2012 and Gretchen Peters in March 2012. In 2014, she performed at the CBC Canada Day Songwriters' Circle.

She collaborated with Lynn Miles in the band project The Lynnes, who released their debut album Heartbreak Song for the Radio in 2018. In 2018 The LYNNeS were nominated for 5 Canadian Folk Music Awards, winning English Songwriter of the Year and Ensemble of the Year.

== Discography ==
- Things I Miss (2006)
- 11 Months (2008)
- Once the Sun Goes Down (2010)
- River of Sand (2014)
- 7 Deadly Spins (2015)
- Uneven Ground (2017)
- Heartbreak Song for the Radio (2018 / The LYNNeS)
- Just Words (2020)
- Ice Cream in November (2022)
- Just a Poet (2024)

=== Contributions ===
- Shane Simpson, Sketches (2001)
- Shane Simpson, More Electric (2002)

== Awards and achievements ==
- Canadian Folk Music Award nominee Contemporary Album of the Year (2024)
- Canadian Folk Music Award winner English Songwriter and Ensemble of the Year with The LYNNeS (2018)
- Canadian Folk Music Award nominee Vocal Group, producer, Contemporary Album of the Year with The LYNNeS (2018)
- Colleen Peterson Songwriting Award (2010)
- Canadian Folk Music Award nominee Emerging Artist (2009)
- Kerrville Folk Festival New Folk finalist (2009)
- Mountain Stage New Song regional finalist (2008)
