= Minor Empire =

Turkish-Canadian progressive music group

- Origin: Toronto, Ontario, Canada
- Genres: Progressive music
- Years active: 2010–present
- Labels: World Trip Records
- Members: Ozan Boz; Ozgu Ozman; Michael Occhipinti; Chris Gartner; Ben Riley; Patrick Graham; Rob Joanisse; Tamer Pinarbasi; Lina Allemano; Debashis Sinha
- Past members: Selim Sesler; Ismail Hakki Fencioglu; Didem Basar
- Website: minorempire.net

Minor Empire are a Turkish-Canadian progressive music group formed in 2010 in Toronto, Ontario, which has been noted for its mixture of psychedelic rock and Turkish music.

== History ==
Minor Empire was founded in 2010 by guitarist/composer/producer Ozan Boz and singer Ozgu Ozman. Their debut album Second Nature was released in January 2011. Exclaim! magazine called the album "successfully dreamy", and another reviewer called it "bold, expertly worked and voluptuous". Minor Empire made Alevi Turkish folk song covers. Minor Empire won the award for World Group of the Year at the 2011 Canadian Folk Music Awards, and he award for World Artist/Group of the Year at the 2012 Canadian Independent Music Awards.

Their second album Uprooted was released in 2017. The Arts Fuse listed Uprooted as one of its favorite releases of the year. Minor Empire was nominated at the Canadian Folk Music Awards and Independent Music Awards again in 2018.

== Discography ==
- Second Nature (2011)
- Uprooted (2017)
