= J. P. Cormier =

Canadian musician

- J.P. Cormier and Hilda Chiasson-Cormier performing in Edmonton in 2005

Background information
- Born: John Paul Cormier; January 23, 1969 (age 56); London, Ontario
- Genres: Bluegrass. Folk music, Celtic
- Occupation(s): Musician, singer-songwriter
- Instrument(s): Guitar, mandolin, banjo, violin (fiddle), piano, upright bass, dobro, tenor banjo, cello, percussion
- Years active: 1981–present
- Labels: Flash Entertainment, Fontana North
- Website: http://www.jp-cormier.com/

John Paul "J.P." Cormier (born January 23, 1969), is a Canadian bluegrass/folk/Celtic singer-songwriter and multi-instrumentalist. To date he has won thirteen East Coast Music Awards and one Canadian Folk Music Award.

Cormier was born in London, Ontario and began playing guitar around age five. As a child he displayed an unusual ability to play a variety of instruments by ear and won a guitar contest at age nine. Appearances on Up Home Tonight, a television show devoted to bluegrass music, followed at age fourteen.

Cormier has stated that he learned to play guitar by listening to such noted country / bluegrass musicians as Chet Atkins and Doc Watson. Other instruments J.P. has played on his albums include fiddle, twelve string guitar, upright bass, banjo, mandolin, drums, percussion, synthesizer, cello, tenor banjo and piano.

By age sixteen Cormier had recorded his first album (a collection of bluegrass instrumentals) and he began working the U.S. festival circuit. This led him to move to the United States and to begin working as a session musician. He continued to perform live on the festival circuit and at the Grand Ole Opry with country artists Waylon Jennings, Marty Stuart, Earl Scruggs, Bill Monroe and others.

In 1989 he attended the now-named Northeast Mississippi Community College in Booneville, Mississippi, where he majored in music education. At the time it was one of only three colleges in North America that offered a specialty in bluegrass instruments. During his stay at Northeast he began playing the dobro and piano. It was also during this time he first had the idea for the song "Northwind".

Cormier was involved in a serious truck accident in 2009, resulting in a fractured vertebra and a halt to his touring in 2012. He went back into the studio, focused on his singer-songwriter abilities, and released Somewhere in the Back of My Heart in the same year.

In April 2015 Cormier released a new album, The Chance, which included the previously released single Hometown Battlefield, about soldiers experiencing posttraumatic stress disorder. The song, inspired by Cormier's 2007 Afghanistan tour and news about soldiers' suicides, went viral, with millions of Facebook visits and 800,000 YouTube views (July 2015).

== Discography ==
- Return to the Cape (1995)
- Another Morning (1997)
- Heart & Soul (1999)
- Now That the Work Is Done (2001)
- Primary Color (2002)
- Velvet Arm Golden Hand (2002)
- X8… a mandolin collection (2004)
- The Long River: A Personal Tribute to Gordon Lightfoot (2005)
- Primary Color: The Owner's Manual (2005)
- Looking Back – Volume 1: The Instrumentals (2005)
- Looking Back – Volume 2: The Songs (2005)
- Take Five – A Banjo Collection (2006)
- The Messenger – J.P. Cormier Sings (2008)
- Noel – A J.P. Cormier Christmas (2008)
- Somewhere in the Back of My Heart (2012)
- The Chance (2015)
- Two with Dave Gunning as Gunning & Cormier (2017)
- Once with Tim Edey (2018)
- Leather and Dust with Dave Gunning as Gunning & Cormier (2023)

Albums No Longer Available

- "Out Of The Blue" (Out Of Print)
- "The Gift" (Out Of Print)
- "Lord Of The Dance" (Out Of Print)
- "When January Comes" (Out Of Print)
- The Fiddle Album (1991) CBC UG 1003

== Awards ==
He has won or been nominated for the following awards:

- Maritime Fiddle Festival- Best Reel - 1989
- East Coast Music Award (ECMA) Instrumental Album of the Year - 1991
- Maritime Fiddling Festival – Best Reel – 1995
- East Coast Music Award(ECMA) Roots/Traditional Artist of the Year – 1998
- Nominated for a Juno Award in the Roots/Trad recording of the year category for "Another Morning" 1998
- East Coast Music Award (ECMA) Instrumental Album of the Year – 2000
- East Coast Music Award (ECMA) Instrumental Artist of the Year – 2003
- Music Industry Association Nova Scotia (MIANS) Folk/Roots Artist of the Year – 2005
- Music Industry Association Nova Scotia (MIANS) Musician of the Year – 2005
- Canadian Folk Music Awards – Instrumental Album of the Year – 2005
- East Coast Music Award (ECMA) Folk Recording of the Year – 2006 (The Long River)

In addition, he has won several East Coast Music Awards and the Music Industry Association of Nova Scotia (MIANS) Award in various years.

In 2005 the Bravo! network aired J.P. Cormier – The Man and His Music, a one-hour documentary examining the life and music of J.P. Cormier. J.P. was also featured on Bravo's half-hour program "Men Of Music".
