= M. Tamer Özsu =

Computer scientist (b. 1951)

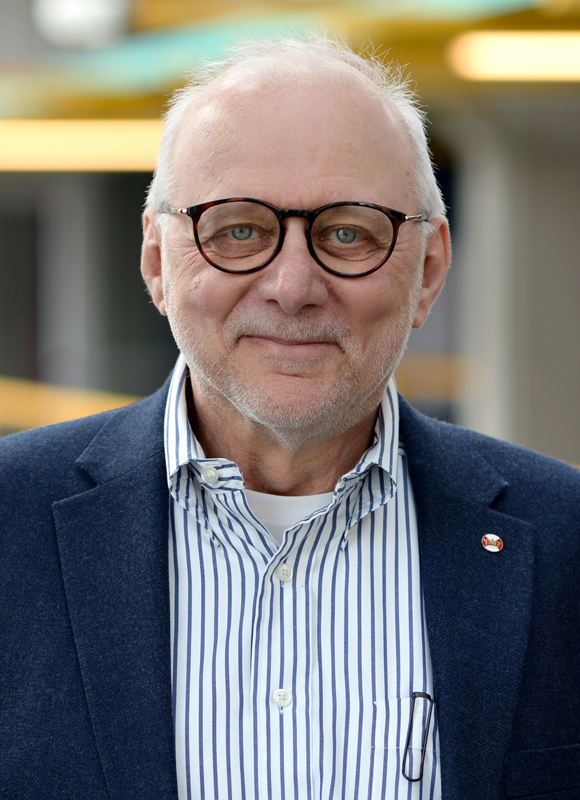
- M. Tamer Özsu in 2018
- Born: March 18, 1951 (age 75); Tavşanlı, Turkey
- Citizenship: Canadian; Turkish
- Education: Middle East Technical University (BS, MS); Ohio State University (MS, PhD)
- Known for: Distributed and parallel data management
- Scientific career
- Fields: Computer science
- Workplaces: University of Alberta; University of Waterloo
- Academic advisors: Bruce Weide
- Website: https://cs.uwaterloo.ca/~tozsu/

M. Tamer Özsu, FRSC (born March 18, 1951) is a Turkish Canadian computer scientist working in the area of distributed and parallel data management. He is a University Professor in the David R. Cheriton School of Computer Science at the University of Waterloo.

== Career and research ==
Özsu was born in Tavşanlı, Turkey. After completing bachelor's and master's degrees in industrial engineering at Middle East Technical University in Ankara, Turkey in 1974 and 1978, respectively, he completed an MS in 1981 and a PhD in 1983 in computer and information science at the Ohio State University.

After his doctoral degree, Özsu accepted a position as an assistant professor of computing science at the University of Alberta in 1984. In 2000, he joined the David R. Cheriton School of Computer Science as a professor.

Özsu's research is on large-scale data distribution and management of non-relational data. He coauthored with Patrick Valduriez Principles of Distributed Database Systems, fourth edition. He is co-editor-in-chief, with Ling Liu, of the Encyclopedia of Database Systems, second edition, was the founding editor-in-chief (2013–19) of ACM Books, and the founding series editor (2009–13) of Synthesis Lectures on Data Management.

== Awards and honours ==
In 2018, Özsu was named University Professor, a position the University of Waterloo established in 2005 to recognize exceptional scholarly achievement and international pre-eminence among its faculty. In 2022, he received the IEEE Innovation in Societal Infrastructure Award for "contributions to data science infrastructure and distributed data management"; in 2019, he received the 2018 CS-Can/Info-Can Lifetime Achievement Award. He is a current holder of a David R. Cheriton Faculty Fellowship in Computer Science from 2018 to 2021, a position he held previously from 2013 to 2016.

Özsu was named a Fellow of the American Association for the Advancement of Science in 2017, a Fellow of the Royal Society of Canada in 2016, and an elected member of the Science Academy, Turkey in 2013. He became a Fellow of the Institute of Electrical and Electronics Engineers in 2010 and a Fellow of the Association for Computing Machinery in 2006.
