= Aycan Yurtsever =

Turkish-Canadian physicist

Aycan Yurtsever is a Turkish-Canadian physicist, currently a Canada Research Chair at Université du Québec's Institut national de recherche scientifique.
