= Ramazan Gençay =

Turkish-born Canadian economist (1961–2018)

- Born: 17 February 1961; Turkey
- Died: December 2018 (aged 57); Colombia
- Cause of death: Poisoning
- Education: Middle East Technical University; University of Guelph; University of Houston
- Occupation: Economist
- Employer: Simon Fraser University

Ramazan Gençay (17 February 1961 – December 2018) was a Turkish-born Canadian economist. Born in Turkey, he graduated from Middle East Technical University in Ankara and attended graduate school in North America, where he earned a master's degree from the University of Guelph and a PhD from the University of Houston. He taught economics at the University of Windsor and Carleton University until 2004, and he was a professor of economics at Simon Fraser University from 2004 to 2018. He was "found dead" in Colombia on December 24, 2018 due to suspected scopolamine poisoning. According to SFU, he was "a pioneer in the use of wavelets to analyze financial data, in the analysis of high-frequency data, and [...] in the role of economic networks in financial markets."
