= David Francey =

Canadian folk singer-songwriter

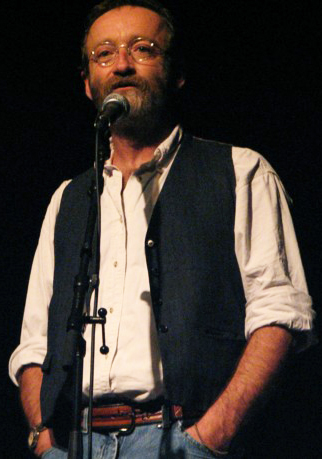

Background information
- Born: November 17, 1954 (age 71); Ayrshire, Scotland
- Origin: Canada
- Genres: Folk
- Occupations: Musician, singer-songwriter
- Instrument: Vocals
- Years active: 1999–present
- Website: davidfrancey.com

David Francey (born 1954) is a Canadian folk singer-songwriter. He is the recipient of four Juno Awards and three Canadian Folk Music Awards.

== Early life ==
Francey was born in Ayrshire, Scotland. He immigrated to Canada with his family at age 12. He has no formal training in music.

== Career ==
Francey worked as a rail yard worker and a carpenter for 20 years. At age 45, he began a career in folk music, finding success on the folk festival circuit.

Francey's experiences in working-class life strongly influenced his 1999 debut album, Torn Screen Door, which featured the songs "Gypsy Boys", "Hard Steel Mill", "Working Poor", and "Torn Screen Door". Other musical themes include admiration of the natural beauty of the Canadian landscape and traditional folk themes of love and loss.

From 1997 to 2004, Francey was accompanied on guitar by Canadian guitarist and producer Dave Clarke. During that period, Clarke co-produced Francey's first three albums, including the Juno-winning Far End of Summer and Skating Rink.

His 2004 album, The Waking Hour, is a collaboration with traditional country artists Kieran Kane, Kevin Welch, and Fats Kaplin. It includes some of his darker material, including "Wishing Well", about the execution of Timothy McVeigh, and "Fourth of July", a political commentary on the post–September 11 United States. In 2004, Francey won first prize in the folk category of the 9th Annual USA Songwriting Competition.

Accompanied by fellow Canadian guitarist Shane Simpson until October 2006, Francey toured various locations across Canada, the United States, England, Scotland, and Australia. In October 2006, Francey toured with New Hampshire-based singer-songwriter Craig Werth, co-producer of Francey's 2007 release, Right of Passage. Canadian guitarist Mark Westberg met Francey in 1999 at Bishop's University and accompanied him occasionally on tour until 2011, when he joined Francey as his primary guitarist.

Francey's 2009 album Seaway is a collaboration with Mike Ford, former member of Moxy Früvous. It is a collection of songs inspired by their voyage on M.S. Algoville.

In 2010, his song "The Waking Hour" won the Session I Grand Prize in the folk category of the John Lennon Songwriting Contest.

In 2011, he released an album, Late Edition.

In 2016, Francey won two Canadian Folk Music Awards, solo artist and contemporary album of the year, for his album Empty Train.

== Personal life ==
Francey lives in Elphin, Ontario, with his wife.

== Awards and nominations ==
- Winner, 2002 Juno Award, Best Roots & Traditional Album - Solo, for Far End of Summer
- Winner, 2002 Penguin Eggs Magazine's Album Of The Year - Solo, for Far End Of Summer
- Winner, 2003 Penguin Eggs Magazine's Album Of The Year - Solo, for Skating Rink
- Winner, 2004 Juno Award, Best Roots & Traditional Album - Solo, for Skating Rink
- Winner, First Prize (Folk), 9th Annual USA Songwriting Competition
- Nomination, 2005 Juno Award, Best Roots & Traditional Album - Solo, for The Waking Hour
- Winner, 2007 Canadian Folk Music Awards, Best Singer - Contemporary, for Right of Passage
- Winner, 2008 Juno Award, Best Roots & Traditional Album - Solo, for Right of Passage
- Nomination, 2010 Canadian Folk Music Awards, Best Contemporary Album - Collaboration, for Seaway
- Winner, 2010 7th Annual IAMA (International Acoustic Music Awards)
- Nomination, 2011 Canadian Folk Music Awards, Solo Artist Of The Year
- Nomination, 2011 Canadian Folk Music Awards, English Songwriter Of The Year
- Nomination, 2012 Juno Award, Best Roots & Traditional Album - Solo, for Late Edition
- Nomination, 2012 Juno Award, Best Music DVD Of The Year - Burning Bright
- Nomination, 2014 Juno Award, Best Roots & Traditional Album - Solo, for So Say We All
- Winner, 2024 Juno Award, Best Roots & Traditional Album - for The Breath Between

== Discography ==
- Torn Screen Door (1999)
- Far End of Summer (2001)
- Skating Rink (2003)
- The Waking Hour (2004) with Kevin Welch, Kieran Kane and Fats Kaplin
- The First Set (2006)
- Carols for a Christmas Eve (2006)
- Right of Passage (2007)
- Seaway (2009)
- Late Edition (2011)
- So Say We All (2013)
- Empty Train (2016)
- The Broken Heart of Everything (2018)
- The Breath Between (2023)
