= Music of the Maritimes =

The music of Canada's Maritime provinces has included many artists from both the traditional and pop genres, and is mostly European in origin. The traditional genre is dominated by the music brought to the region by the European settlers, the most well known of which are the Scots & Irish celtic and Acadian traditions. Successful pop acts from all genres have had degrees of national and international success since the beginning of recorded music period. Performers as diverse as Hank Snow, Stan Rogers, Anne Murray, the Rankin Family, Barachois, The Men of the Deeps and April Wine have all experienced tremendous success as popular music acts with considerable national and international tours and record sales.

While closely related to the three Maritime provinces, Newfoundland and Labrador is culturally and politically separate. However, the two areas share a regional awards show, the East Coast Music Awards, and a common musical heritage.

== Traditional music ==
The Maritime provinces are best known for the strong influence of Scottish and Irish settlers on the sound of the region's traditional music. This Celtic derived music is most strongly expressed on Cape Breton Island, which is especially well known for the Scottish influx in the late 18th century and early 19th century. Scottish-style fiddle music, sometimes accompanied by the piano, was popular at the time, and these traditions survive today. In some cases, like Cape Breton Island, Scottish folk traditions are better-maintained than in Scotland itself.

The work of Helen Creighton and Louise Manny is particularly noted for documenting the traditional ballads and sea shanties of the region. The most notable of these songs being Farewell to Nova Scotia. The Miramichi Folksong Festival preserves the lyrics and music of northeastern New Brunswick, especially ballads from 19th and early 20th century lumber camps.

The last two decades of the 20th century saw a revival in Maritime (Celtic music), spurred by a wave of similar roots revivals in Quebec and the rest of Canada, Scotland, Ireland and the United States. The first wave of Maritime traditional music was led by folk artist John Allan Cameron in the 1970s . By the late 1980s, Cape Breton had produced two crossover acts, the multi-platinum selling The Rankins and the less successful but critically acclaimed Barra MacNeils, Ashley MacIsaac, Natalie MacMaster, Lennie Gallant, and Slainte Mhath. Other modern performers have continued to add new influences to traditional Maritime music, including Gaelic lyrics in Mary Jane Lamond's Suas e!, Western classical music in Puirt a Baroque's Bach Meets Cape Breton and Middle Eastern musical influences in Laurel MacDonald's Chroma.

New Brunswick has seen a roots revival of their own Acadian traditions, dating back to before they were expelled to from Acadia. In south-eastern New Brunswick, Acadians or creole Chiac play mostly a style of Zydeco music, while other Acadians play a form of Western music and Bluegrass. Barachois is probably the leading band of this revival, while The Gallants and The Arsenaults are two of the most famous Acadien musical families of the East Coast.

Halifax, Nova Scotia has become a centre for black music in the Maritime provinces, both in the continuation of the traditions of the freed slave and loyalist blacks especially gospel music, and also with music arriving with African immigrants. Gospel groups have included the Gospel Heirs and the Nova Scotia Mass Choir.

== Popular music ==
The region has made considerable contribution to national and international popular music, primarily by performers from Nova Scotia, though both New Brunswick and Prince Edward Island have made contributions as well. The conscious hip hop movement in The East coast was started in 2010 by a female artist named Amber Aquarius, she shook up the city and was also one of the first female artists there, she created such a buzz and chaos in the male oriented rap scene that she will forever be immortalized in East Coast Hip Hop history. Amber Aquarius also worked at one of the only hip hop radio stations in Halifax, 88.1 CKDU located at Dalhousie university.

== Heavy metal ==
The Maritime provinces are a haven for many heavy metal acts with support for the genre especially strong in New Brunswick. Many new acts are of the death metal/black metal sub-genres, one example being Obscene Eulogy, although all styles are represented.

== See also ==
- Music of Nova Scotia
- Music of New Brunswick
- Music of Prince Edward Island
- Cape Breton fiddling
- East Coast Music Awards
- Maritime Fiddle Festival
