= Music of Prince Edward Island =

Prince Edward Island is a province of Canada consisting of the island of the same name, and several much smaller islands. Prince Edward Island is one of the three Maritime Provinces and is the smallest province in both land area and population.

The musical culture is changing rapidly in Prince Edward Island at this time as traditional Celtic musicians, while in some ways more prominent than ever, are not as common in small rural communities as they once were. Celtic music is still very much around and can be heard at festivals, ceilidhs and pubs throughout the island, especially in the summer. That being said traditional Scottish ceilidhs are rarely frequented by young people and the younger generation has been diverging along an urban rural divide, in that young people in rural parts of the island now tend to follow Country and Western music, almost assuming it is an extension of local tradition, due to the similarities, when it is in fact an American import. Before the introduction of radio to the island, Country and Western music was unheard of and in most places traditional Celtic or Acadian music dominated. Due to the rural farming traditions of the Island and the similarities between Country Music and Celtic Music, Country Music quickly became popular in the 1930s. It was an easy adoption, considering that the Bluegrass/Mountain Music which spawned Country and Western Music, is closely related to the Celtic and Maritime musical tradition. Even the Ceilidh itself is suffering. With fewer young people attending them, they are becoming more of a tourist attraction than an actual living form of culture. While Celtic music on the island may appear to some to be stronger than ever due to the promotion of many world class island musicians, its place in the rural, local culture has been somewhat diminished.

That being said, there is a strong effort to revive Celtic culture on the island, from the PEI Fiddle Camp held every July, to the availability of Gaelic classes at Colonel Gray High School in Charlottetown. Other festivities, events and locations promoting local traditional music culture include: Rollo Bay Fiddle Festival which was created to preserve Prince Edward Island's tradition of music, Close to the Ground concert series hosted by Fiddler's Sons, The International PEI Shellfish Festival hosted by Liam Dolan, The Festival of Small Halls, the College of Piping and Celtic Performing Arts concert series (Highland Storm), The Benevolent Irish Society Ceilis, The Orwell Corner ceilidhs, the Summerside Highland Gathering, the Belfast (PEI) Highland Games, the Indian River Festival and more. The summer time is the best time of the year to experience PEI traditional music and despite the concerns noted above, if you were to tour the island in the Summer, you would leave with the impression that the traditional Celtic and Acadian cultures brought the island over 300 years ago were remarkably intact.

== Prince Edward Island Symphony Orchestra ==
The Prince Edward Island Symphony Orchestra (PEISO) is a community orchestra based in Charlottetown and founded in 1967. It consists of professional, amateur, and student musicians, and is currently led by conductor Mark Shapiro. The PEISO's annual concert season consists of four programs, which are performed at the Confederation Centre of the Arts or at Zion Presbyterian Church.

== Charlottetown ==
Charlottetown is the capital and largest city on the island. Its documented music history begins in the 19th century, with religious music, some written by local pump and block maker, and organ-importer, Watson Duchemin. Several big bands including the Sons of Temperance Band and the Charlottetown Brass Band, were active.

By the end of the century, Charlottetown had its own opera house, performing comic operas by Gilbert and Sullivan.

The Prince Edward Island Music Festival was first held in 1946, inaugurated by the Women's Institute of Prince Edward Island. Fiddler Don Messer moved to Charlottetown in 1939 where he joined CFCY as music director. He formed the "Islanders" and by 1944 the group was airing a show nationally on CBC Radio, becoming established as the most popular on Canadian radio from the 1940s to the 1960s and later on television.

The Prince Edward Island Symphony Orchestra is also well-known. Other well-known famous performers from Charlottetown have included Haywire, Teresa Doyle, Tara MacLean, Nancy White, Walter MacNutt, UIGG, William Keith Rogers and ECMA winners The Saddle River Stringband. The Charlottetown Festival is a seasonal musical theatre festival which runs from late May to mid-October every year since 1965. It includes a summer musical theatre training program called the "Young Company", whose shows are freely available to the public and feature Canadian-themed content.

== Fiddle culture ==
The province is known for its old and vibrant fiddling tradition. Fiddle music came to Prince Edward Island in the late 18th century with its early Scottish settlers. Further immigration from the fiddle hotbeds of Ireland and the Scottish Highlands strengthened the tradition, which gradually spread in all communities, including the Evangeline region with a sizeable Acadian population. Although the role of community fiddlers has declined due to advancements in technology, the tradition is still part of cultural life of the province.

== Notable musicians ==
- Lennie Gallant
- Stompin' Tom Connors
- Cynthia MacLeod
- Gene MacLellan
- Tim Chaisson
- Angèle Arsenault
- Tara MacLean
- Nancy White
- Walter MacNutt

== Notable music bands ==
- Two Hours Traffic
- Boxer the Horse
- Paper Lions
- Saddle River String Band
- Haywire
- Death Valley Driver
- Alvvays
- The East Pointers
- Barachois
- Strawberry
- Ten Strings and a Goat Skin
- Vishtèn
- The Danks
- Eklektikos

== See also ==
- Prince Edward Island Music Awards
