= Millefiore Clarkes =

Canadian filmmaker

- Born: Toronto, Ontario, Canada
- Other name: Mille Clarkes
- Education: University of King's College
- Occupations: filmmaker, editor, producer
- Years active: 2005 –
- Style: lyrical
- Children: 1
- Father: Gerard Luther Clarkes

Millefiore Clarkes (also called Mille Clarkes), is a Canadian filmmaker from Prince Edward Island. She has produced music videos, experimental shorts and documentary films, as well as commercials. She also owns and operates One Thousand Flowers Productions. The name of the film production company is derived from her first name, which means "one thousand flowers" in Italian.

== Personal life ==
Mille Clarkes was born in Toronto and moved to Prince Edward Island with her father when she was 11 years old. Her father is Canadian artist and composer Gerard Luther Clarkes, they have worked together on Melodies for Max (2013) and Land Feed the Farmer (2015) for the PEI Council of the Arts.

She currently resides in Belfast, Prince Edward Island where she lives with her son.

== Career ==
After studying philosophy at King's College in Halifax, Nova Scotia, she went on a road trip across Canada, the United States and Mexico, and documented her travels. She returned to her home in Prince Edward Island with 60–70 hours of footage and taught herself Final Cut Pro at the Island Media Arts Cooperative. Stalking Love (2005) was shown in five film festivals and aired more than 20 times on CBC's documentary channel from 2006 to 2009. According to Clarkes, her experimental documentary is not so much about love as about the people talking about love. She said "If you ask people about love, their answer is very telling about who they are as a person. You can’t lie about love—or, if you do [...] that still tells something about who you essentially are".

After producing her film, she worked at the Island Media Arts Cooperative and as an editor and executive director from 2005 to 2008. Her institutional work also includes sitting on the boards of The PEI Council of the Arts and the Women in Film and Television-Atlantic. She is also the curator for The Island Media Arts Festival and one of the founding members of The Island Film Factory.

In 2013 she wrote and directed Island Green (2013), a lyrical short film about organic farming in Prince Edward Island. Produced and distributed by the National Film Board. The 25-minute film is narrated by P.E.I.-born poet, Tanya Davis. It was first shown at the Atlantic Film Festival in Halifax for its world premiere.

She has sat on the boards of The PEI Council of the Arts and Women in Film and Television-Atlantic. She is a founding member of The Island Film Factory and on the board of IMAC. She is the curator for The Island Media Arts Festival.

She also owns One Thousand Flowers Productions where she produces music videos, experimental and documentary shorts, commercials and something she calls pocket-docs (short documentaries for companies). She has worked with the city of Charlottetown, Discover Charlottetown and the Art in the Open festival, Prince Edward Island Farm Center, Confederation Centre of the Arts, the Halifax Jazz Festival, the Neworld theatre, the Macphail Woods Ecological Forestry Project and others.

=== Style ===
What led Mille Clarkes to filmmaking was "happenstance and serendipity" While studying at King's College, she made a super-8 experimental film, and unveiled a passion for observing that had been present since she was a child.

"I was [...] a great lover of other people’s worlds. As a child I used to stay with friends and their families for days on end, absorbing their familial culture, smelling their smells, feeling their rhythms… I always loved entering in and out of worlds. I think these two factors (and a million more) have drawn me to documentary as a form of expression."

Place is a recurring theme in her work and her style has often been described as lyrical. In the analysis of place in Clarkes' first feature documentary Stalking Love, Darrell Varga said

"The images of the landscape punctuating the film are not to provide a stable sense of place but are linked with the idea of journey and process. Local is mitigated by an idea of the universal in a journey across Canada, through the US, and into Mexico, and includes rich and poor characters, young and old, prostitutes, street people, and priests."

Clarkes is an independent filmmaker and despite the constraints working with a small budget brings, she said:

"There is a great communicative strength in attempting to convey something within the limitations you are given. I think meaning comes from the tension between elements. Many of the amazing new technological tools at our disposal today actually detract, rather than add to a filmic expression. Some of the best moments on film come from what is left out, what is suggested rather than revealed."

She highly values post-production and the editor's role in piecing the work together:

"When a person says they're a director, that can mean so many things, [...] it can mean you direct actors or come up with scripts. But for me, the real creative magic happens in the editing suite."

== Awards and recognition ==
- 2011: the Women in Film and Television Atlantic awarded her the Salute Award for her work in the sector.
- 2012: Her short documentary December in Toronto was a Staff Pick on Vimeo and in the Lyrical Category and screened at the 2012 Vimeo Film Festival Awards in New York.
- 2013: She was named the 2013 William F. White PEI Filmmaker of the Year and was awarded the 2013 CBC PEI 321 Award with fellow filmmaker Jason Arsenault for their film Little Bay Island.

Clarkes won Best Music Video at the Music PEI Awards three consecutive years. In 2012 for Catherine MacLellan's Stealin’, in 2013 for English Words' People I Love, and in 2014 for Paper Lions' Philadelphia.

== Filmography ==
=== As editor/producer ===
- In Between Spaces (2011)

=== As director/producer ===
Films

- Stalking Love (2005)
- Island Green (2013)
- Islands (2014)
- Blue Rodeo: On the Road (2014)
- The Telling (2011)
- Something in the Water (2011)

Experimental Shorts

- Crows and Branches
- December in Toronto (2011)
- Once again Toronto (2013)
- L.A. one Day (2014)
- ACROSS America (2015)
- If my Silence (video response to The Meantime's song)
- Land Feed the Farmer (2015)

Music Videos

- Catherine MacLellan's Frost in the Hollows
- Coyote's Proof of Life
- Dennis Ellsworth's Hazy Sunshine
- English Words' Go to Bed
- English Words' The People I Love
- English Words' Passmore Radio
- Catherine MacLellan's The Raven's Sun
- Irish Mythen's Wicked and the Wild
- Paper Lions' Philadelphia
- Paper Lions' Pull me In
- Paper Lions' My Friend
- Paper Lions' Little Liar
- Catherine MacLellan's Stealin'
- Becky Siamon's Trouble with Hank
- Meaghan Blanchard's A Coat of Many Colours
- Nudie and the Turks' Dear Departed
