= Ashley Condon =

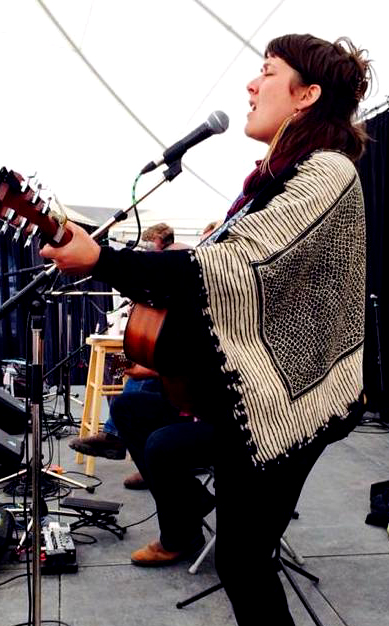

Background information
- Born: Ashley Condon; Pictou, Nova Scotia
- Origin: Canada
- Genres: Folk, Country, Singer/Songwriter
- Years active: 2007 - 2018
- Label: Laker Music
- Website: www.ashleycondon.com

Ashley Condon is a Canadian folk singer/songwriter from Montague, Prince Edward Island. She has released two full-length albums and won New Artist of the Year at the 2012 PEI Music Awards.

== Life and career ==
=== Before the Music ===
Ashley Condon was born in Pictou, Nova Scotia, moving to Prince Edward Island at the age of 6 months. She was an only child with an older half sister from her mother's previous marriage, growing up in a family involved in the fishing industry. Condon's father died when she was six years old, leaving her mother and her to take over the family business. Condon's mother became one of the first female fishing captains in Eastern PEI. Condon's mother died of cancer while Condon was studying Drama Studies at the University of Toronto, leaving Condon to lose both of her parents by the age of 22. After completing this degree, Condon studied Psychotherapy for three years.

=== 2007-2010: I've Got This Feeling and Come In From the Cold ===
Condon released her first EP, I've Got This Feeling in 2007, that garnered the attention of the Ontario native and ECMA-nominated producer and musician Joel Hunt, who has worked with Teresa Ennis (of The Ennis Sisters), and Old Man Luedecke. Hunt worked on Condon's first full-length album, Come In From the Cold. This album was released June 15, 2010, and was nominated for Country Recording of the Year at the East Coast Music Awards in 2011. That year, Condon was also nominated for New/Emerging Artist of the Year at the Canadian Folk Music Awards. Condon was one of the winners at the 2012 PEI Music Awards, winning New Artist of the Year and the Lynn Grishko Memorial Busary at the 2012 PEI Music Awards. Condon was also nominated for Roots Contemporary Recording of the Year, and Female Solo Recording of the Year.

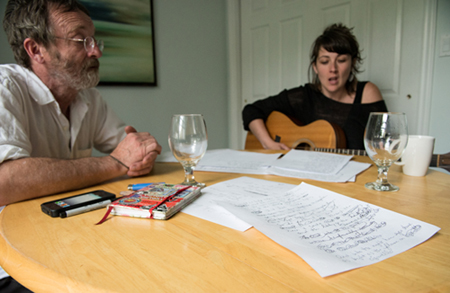
Ashley Condon and David Francey during a writing session in 2014

=== 2013-2018: This Great Compromise and Working with David Francey ===
Condon's sophomore album, This Great Compromise was released May 27, 2013, and was produced by three-time JUNO award-winning folk singer-songwriter, David Francey. Condon was backed by Francey's band for the album, and shortly after, was signed by both Francey's label (Laker Music) and his manager, Mark Watson (Watson Entertainment). The album was placed at the seventh spot on Galaxie Radio's Top 50 most played Canadian albums airing on Galaxie Folk-Roots in 2013, and entered the Top 20 Folk Americana/Roots Country charts in February 2014.

=== Collaborations: Eastern Belles and Can You Hear Me ===
In 2016, Condon toured Canada with fellow PEI singer-songwriters Catherine MacLellan and Meaghan Blanchard as The Eastern Belles. The group's sound is drawn from country, folk, and Americana. In 2017, Condon launched her fourth album, Can You Hear Me, produced by Dale Murray, which featured collaborations with PEI artists and artists who came to PEI.

=== Concert Tours and Festivals ===
Condon went on a national tour of Canada in the fall of 2013 to promote This Great Compromise, performing at folk festivals such as The Stan Rogers Folk Festival, The Lunenburg Folk Harbour Festival and The Shelter Valley Folk Festival. In 2014, Condon performed at Burlington's Sound of Music Festival.

== Discography ==
=== Albums ===
I've Got This Feeling – released in 2007
Come In From The Cold – released June 15, 2010
This Great Compromise – released May 27, 2013
Can You Hear Me – released October 4, 2017

== Awards and nominations ==
• Nomination, 2011 Canadian Folk Music Awards – New/Emerging Artist of the Year
• Nomination, 2011 East Coast Music Awards – Country Recording of the Year
• 2011 - Canadian Folk Music Awards New/Emerging Artist of the Year - "Come In From the Cold" • Winner, 2012 PEI Music Awards – New Artist of the Year
• Winner, 2012 PEI Music Awards – Lynn Grishko Memorial Bursary
• Nomination, 2012 PEI Music Awards – Roots Contemporary Recording of the Year
• Nomination, 2012 PEI Music Awards – Female Solo Recording of the Year

• 2013 - Canadian Folk Music Awards New/Emerging Artist of the Year - "This Great Compromise"
