= Prince Edward Island Symphony Orchestra =

Prince Edward Island Symphony Orchestra (PEISO)
- Orchestra
- Founded: 1967
- Location: Charlottetown, Prince Edward Island, Canada
- Music director: Jaelem Bhate
- Website: www.peisymphony.com

The Prince Edward Island Symphony Orchestra (PEISO) is a community orchestra based in Charlottetown, Prince Edward Island, Canada. Founded in 1967, the orchestra consists of professional, amateur, and student musicians, and is led by conductor Jaelem Bhate, who became music director in 2024. The PEISO's annual concert season consists of four programs, which are performed either at the Confederation Centre of the Arts or at Zion Presbyterian Church in Charlottetown.

== History ==
In 1967, a group of musicians and PEI community members entered into discussions that would result in the formation of the PEI Symphony Orchestra. These included professors Thomas Hahn and Hubert Tersteeg - both members of the newly inaugurated UPEI music department - and music teacher Cornelius "Con" Zaat.

Among the many guest soloists who have performed with the PEISO are Canadian classical musicians Martin Beaver, Measha Brueggergosman, Denise Djokic, Marc Djokic, Janina Fialkowska, Rivka Golani, Anton Kuerti, Suzie LeBlanc, Wendy Nielsen, Shauna Rolston, and Jasper Wood. Featured popular music artists have included musicians such as John Allan Cameron, Lennie Gallant, John McDermott, Nancy White, Richard Wood, and groups such as Barachois, The Barra MacNeils, Jive Kings, Paper Lions, and Vishtèn. Many local musicians have also been featured as soloists, including the young winners of the annual Suzanne Brenton Memorial Award, which is administered by the PEI Kiwanis Music Festival Association.

As part of its ongoing commitment to the performance of Canadian music, the PEISO has commissioned many works by Canadian composers, including several by Jim O'Leary, a PEI composer originally from Newfoundland. The first of these was O'Leary's Concerto for Trombone and Orchestra, which was commissioned with the assistance of the Canada Council for the Arts, and premiered on October 23, 2005 with trombonist Dale Sorensen. On April 5, 2009, the PEISO performed O'Leary's Three Studies for orchestra. Two years later the PEISO commissioned F. Jane Naylor to compose a new work for a program featuring music by women composers; her Two Connections for orchestra was premiered on October 16, 2011. That same year the PEISO named Jim O'Leary composer-in-residence, which resulted in the creation of three new works: Softly at Night the Stars are Shining for soprano and orchestra (premiered on April 3, 2011 with soprano Helen Pridmore); Sixty Three for orchestra (premiered on April 15, 2012); and Choose Other Routes for jazz trumpet soloist and orchestra (premiered on April 14, 2013 with trumpeter Paul Tynan).

During his tenure, O'Leary initiated a Call for Scores competition aimed at PEI composers, which resulted in the premiere performance of Richard Covey's Arise for orchestra on February 10, 2013. In 2014 the PEISO held another composition competition, administered with the financial support of the PEI 2014 Fund, a program implemented by both the PEI provincial and Canadian federal governments to celebrate the sesquicentennial anniversary of the 1864 Charlottetown Conference. Composers across the country were invited to submit orchestral works on a Canadian theme, and the two winning works, Garrett Krause's Where Pines and Maples Grow, and Alice Ping Yee Ho's Ocean Child, were premiered on November 23, 2014. Also in 2014, with support from the PEI Council of the Arts, the PEISO commissioned Richard Covey and PEI fiddler Roy Johnstone to collaborate on a symphonic poem celebrating the natural beauty and cultural diversity of Prince Edward Island. Titled in homage to the local Mi'kmaq First Nations people and their word for their island, Abegweit: Symphony for an Island received its premiere on February 1, 2015. For the 2017 celebrations of the 150th anniversary of Canadian Confederation, Richard Covey and fellow Atlantic Canadian composers Leo Marchildon, Kevin Morse, and Andrew Staniland were commissioned to contribute scores for a collaborative work, Cantata for Canada 150, for which each composer set poetry written by four young PEI students chosen through a province-wide poetry contest. Created with partial funding from the Canadian federal government, the new work was premiered on November 19, 2017. Also on this program was a performance of Canadian composer Kati Agoc's A Hero’s Welcome: Sesquie for Canada’s 150th, which was co-commissioned through a partnership with the Toronto Symphony Orchestra's Canada Mosaic program, a Canada 150 signature project funded by the Government of Canada.

In 2016, the PEISO received the Charlottetown Arts and Culture Artistic Excellence Award.

== Music directors ==
- Thomas Hahn and Hubert Tersteeg (assistant) (1968 – 1970)
- Alan Reesor (1970 – 1976)
- Czeslaw Gladyszewski (1979 – 1980)
- Brian Ellard (1983 – 1997)
- Carolyn Davies (1998 – 2000)
- James Mark (2000 – 2013)
- Mark Shapiro (2013 – 2023)
- Jaelem Bhate (2024 – Present)

In years without a music director, conducting duties were performed by guest conductors and/or music director candidates. Guest conductors have included Howard Cable, Brian Jackson, Scott MacMillan, and Dinuk Wijeratne.

== See also ==
- List of symphony orchestras
- Canadian classical music
