= James Phillips (Canadian musician) =

- Origin: Tyne Valley, Prince Edward Island, Canada
- Occupation(s): Multi-instrumentalist, producer, engineer

James Phillips is a Canadian multi-instrumentalist, producer and engineer hailing from Tyne Valley, Prince Edward Island. He has performed as a member of a number of Island acts including the Saddle River Stringband, the James Phillips Trio, Sweetheart Jim and the Brothers Grim, The New Drifts, La Funk 6, and more. He has also worked with an assortment of maritime artists including Catherine MacLellan and Nathan Wiley. He has won an ECMA for his work on Saddle River's self-titled debut as well as a PEI Music Award for Best Bluegrass Recording & Best New Artist (Saddle River String Band).
