= Dutch Mason =

Canadian musician

- Prime Minister Of The Blues (Photo by Lois Siegel)

Background information
- Born: Norman Byron Mason; 19 February 1938; Lunenburg, Nova Scotia, Canada
- Origin: Halifax, Nova Scotia, Canada
- Died: 23 December 2006 (aged 68) Truro, Nova Scotia, Canada
- Genres: Blues
- Instruments: Guitar, piano, vocals
- Years active: 1950s–2000s
- Website: www.dutchmason.com

Dutch Mason, CM (19 February 1938 – 23 December 2006) was a Canadian musician born in Lunenburg, Nova Scotia, with his local accent he received his nick name 'Dutch'. He was inducted into the Canadian Jazz and Blues Hall of Fame, and was inducted into the Order of Canada in 2005. In 1991, Mason won the Juno Award for Best Roots and Traditional Album, with his performance on the CBC compilation album The Great Canadian Blues Project Vol 1, Saturday Night Blues. After doing an opening set, B. B. King dubbed him 'The Canadian King Of The Blues', but then Mason's friend and harmonica player Rick Jeffery, renamed him 'The Prime Minister of the Blues' since they were Canadian. Mason was a renowned joker when asked what the Juno meant to him he quipped "Thats nice & everything... but I'd rather have the cash".

== Career ==
Mason started performing in the mid-1950s, with his parents playing drums in their Dixieland band at 14 yrs old on New Years Eve. Later he switched to guitar playing rock and roll or rockabilly standards as well as traditional music from the Canadian Maritimes. Mason regularly played the local twin city lounge scene, notably The Wyse Owl / Eastern Billiards, The Dartmouth Inn and The Monterey in Halifax. After discovering B. B. King and the blues, he became known as a blues artist in the 1960s, and he started to tour various parts of Canada. Into the 1970s and onwards, he became a popular act and toured the country regularly, performing at the Albert Hall in Toronto and the Rising Sun in Montreal. In Ottawa he played The Black Swan, The Downstairs Club, & The Rainbow Bistro.

From 1970 until 1972, under the name The Dutch Mason Trio, comprising Dutch Mason (guitar, piano, lead vocals) Ronnie Miller (bass guitar) Ken Clattenburg (drums), recorded At The Candlelight. The recording was augmented with Bucky Adams (saxophone) and Joe Sealy (organ). It contained "Georgia on My Mind", "Sweet Little Angel", "Danger Zone", "The Shape I'm In", "Good Good Woman", "Boss Man", "Everybody's Talkin'" and "Soul Gravy" (which Mason and Miller wrote).

In 1972, Putting It All Together was released, which included the tracks "Waiting For A Train", "Here I Go Again", "You Win Again", "Steamroller Blues", "Crazy Arms", "High Heel Sneakers", "Milk Cow Blues", "Dang Me", and "What Did I Say". From 1972 until 1975, the ensemble changed personnel and had the Jeffery brothers Jack (on bass guitar) and Rick (harmonica), plus Mike Leggatt (keyboards), Gary Blair (drummer) and saw the beginnings of the Dutch Mason Blues Band. In 1975, Janitor of The Blues was issued with tracks including "Swing Low Sweet Cadillac", "Sludgefoot", "Goin' Down", "Down And Out", "All Blues", "Mystery Train", "St James Infirmary", "Blues in The Dark", and "All Right Ok". In 1976 the Dutch Mason Blues Band released their next album, The Blues Ain't Bad which was distributed by London Records. Some of the tracks were "The Thrill is Gone", "Get Out of My Life Woman", "Move Up to the Country", "I'm Ready", and "Hard Times".

Wish Me Luck (1979) was released on London Records and re-released on Attic Records in 1981. Along with songs from his The Blues Ain't Bad album the tracks became the backbone of his repertoire. Attic Records then issued the next two collections as Special Brew and Gimme A Break. The musicians now consisted of Rick Jeffery (harmonica), Gary Blair (drums), Gregg Fancy (bass), Mike Leggett (piano), Donnie Muir (organ, piano), John Lee (piano) and Kenny Pineo (drums on Gimme A Break only). Eventually arthritis forced Mason off the guitar and the road and he disbanded his group and he temporarily retired. After calls of assistance from musicians across Canada, Mason relented and recommenced touring purely as a vocalist.

After almost 10 years Mason recorded again and Stony Plain Records released I'm Back. In 1991, Stony Plain's release of CBC's The Great Canadian Blues Project Vol 1, Saturday Night Blues containing his version of Walter Jacobs "Just Your Fool" won the Juno Award for "Best Roots and Traditional Album", sharing that Juno Award with The Visit by Loreena McKennitt. In 1992 Stony Plain released You Can't Have Everything with Ottawa's Drew Nelson Band, which was also nominated for a Juno. In 1992 he won CBC's listeners poll for the 1st Annual Great Canadian Blues Award.

Mason kept touring with various bands across Canada. In Quebec it was the Boppin' Blues Band, while in Ontario and Quebec it was with Mumbo Jumbo Voodoo Combo.

In 1996, Mason issued the live album Appearing Nightly Dutch Mason The Prime Minister Blues / Live At The Boom Boom Lounge. He underwent a short tour promoting the album with Ottawa's Mumbo Jumbo Vodoo Combo. Near the end of the tour a documentary was made called Bluesman Dutch Mason at J.D.'s in Brampton, Ontario.

In 1998, Dutchie's 60th Birthday Celebration (CBC) was recorded as a live tribute album that included performances by the Nova Scotia Mass Choir, plus Sam Moon and Frank MacKay. In 2004, he was nominated for a Juno Award for Best Blues Album and in 2005 was nominated for Best Blues album at the East Coast Music Awards. In 1999, Goodtimes with Johnny Tornado was released which was another live album.

Live at Ottawa Bluesfest took place on July 14, 2001, where Mason performed and was honoured by CBC Radio DJ Holger Petersen and the founder of Stony Plain Records for his contribution to blues music in Canada. He was backed by his friends and bandmates from over the years. The band consisted of his son Garrett Mason (guitar), Rick Jeffery (harmonica), John Lee (organ, piano), Greg "Fish" Fancy (bass), Tony D. (guitar), Steve Lund (drums), Drew Nelson (guitar), Brian Magner (saxophone), and Zeek Gross (saxophone). In 2004, Mason recorded what turned out to be his last album, Half Ain't Been Told with new songs and re-recordings of some old favourites.

Dutch Mason died on 23 December 2006 and is survived by his sons Charlie Mason and Garrett Mason, who won the 2005 Juno Award for Best Blues album.

== Discography ==
- At the Candlelight – 1970 (reissued as Dutch Mason Blues - 1979)
- Putting It All Together – 1971
- Janitor of the Blues – 1975
- The Blues Ain't Bad – 1976
- Wish Me Luck – 1979
- Special Brew – 1980
- Gimme A Break – 1981
- I'm Back – 1991
- You Can't Have Everything – 1992
- Appearing Nightly: The Prime Minister Of The Blues Live At The Boom Boom Lounge – 1996 (Reissued as Appearing Nightly: Prime Minister Of The Blues - 2003)
- Dutchie's 60th Birthday – 1998
- Goodtimes with Johnny Tornado – 1999
- Half Ain't Been Told - 2004
