= Luc Bourdon =

Canadian ice hockey player (1987–2008)

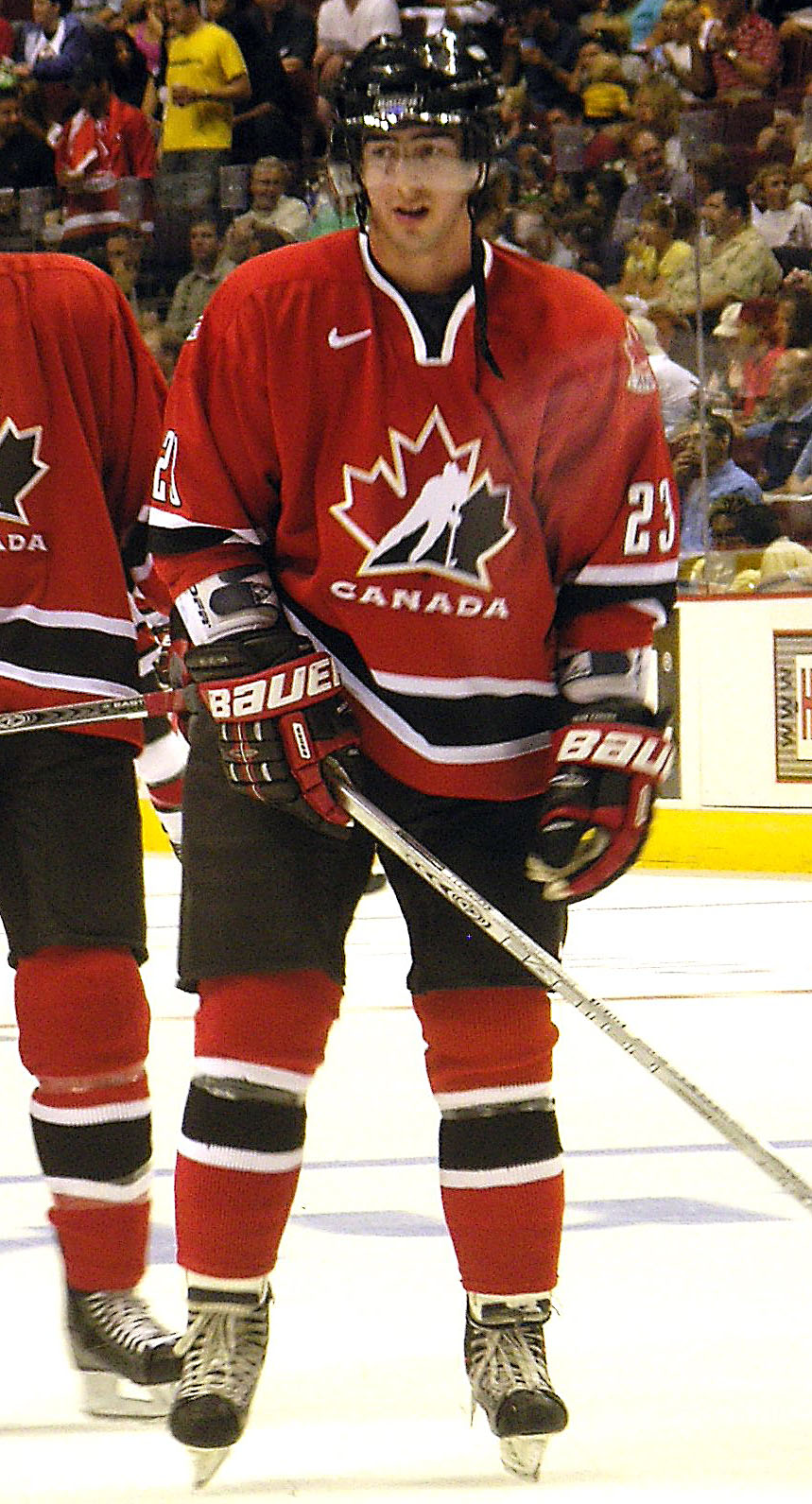
- Bourdon with Canada in 2005
- Born: February 16, 1987 Shippagan, New Brunswick, Canada
- Died: May 29, 2008 (aged 21) Lamèque, New Brunswick, Canada
- Height: 6 ft 3 in (191 cm)
- Weight: 211 lb (96 kg; 15 st 1 lb)
- Position: Defence
- Shot: Left
- Played for: Vancouver Canucks
- NHL draft: 10th overall, 2005; Vancouver Canucks
- Playing career: 2006–2008

Luc Bourdon (February 16, 1987 – May 29, 2008) was a Canadian professional ice hockey player who was a defenceman for the Vancouver Canucks of the National Hockey League (NHL) from 2006 until 2008. After overcoming childhood arthritis, he was selected third overall in the 2003 Quebec Major Junior Hockey League (QMJHL) draft and played for the Val-d'Or Foreurs, Moncton Wildcats, and Cape Breton Screaming Eagles, spending four seasons in the QMJHL. The Canucks drafted Bourdon with their first selection, 10th overall, in the 2005 NHL entry draft, and he split his professional career with the Canucks and their American Hockey League affiliate, the Manitoba Moose. Noted as a strong defenceman who could contribute on offence, Bourdon represented Canada in three international tournaments, winning two gold medals at the IIHF World Junior Championship and a silver medal at the IIHF World U18 Championship.

Bourdon died at the age of 21 near his hometown of Shippagan, New Brunswick when his motorcycle collided with a tractor-trailer.

== Early life ==
Luc Bourdon was born on February 16, 1987, as an only child raised by his mother, Suzanne Boucher, in Shippagan, a small French-speaking town in the northeastern part of the Acadian Peninsula in New Brunswick. At the age of nine, he was diagnosed with juvenile arthritis and needed to use a wheelchair, which he later overcame. As a teenager, Bourdon attended École Marie-Esther, where he was a straight-A student. Growing up in a fishing town, he worked summers on his uncle's crab fishing boat.

As a youth, Bourdon played in the 1999, 2000, and 2001 Quebec International Pee-Wee Hockey Tournaments with the Peninsule Acadien Lynx minor ice hockey team. He later played with the Miramichi Rivermen minor teams from ages 15–16. After being the third overall choice in the 2003 QMJHL draft, Bourdon left home when he was 16, returning in the off-season to live with his mother. Upon turning professional and signing his first contract, he anonymously donated C$10,000 to the local minor hockey association for families who could not afford the equipment. His donation was posthumously revealed by his former bantam hockey coach, Gilles Cormier, who managed the local arena at the time of Bourdon's death.

== Playing career ==
Bourdon joined the Val-d'Or Foreurs for the 2003–04 season, registering eight points in 64 regular season games and scoring one goal in seven playoff games. He appeared in all 70 games with the Foreurs in 2004–05, scoring 13 goals and 19 assists, and participated in the CHL Top Prospects Game, an exhibition for draft-eligible players. In June 2005, Bourdon was the tenth pick overall, selected by the Vancouver Canucks, at the 2005 NHL entry draft. Ranked sixth overall for North American skaters coming into the draft, Bourdon was noted as a physical two-way defenceman with significant offensive skills and a strong shot, as well as an excellent skater. He was the second Shippagan-born hockey player to be drafted in the NHL, after goaltender Yanick Degrace was drafted by the Philadelphia Flyers in 1991.

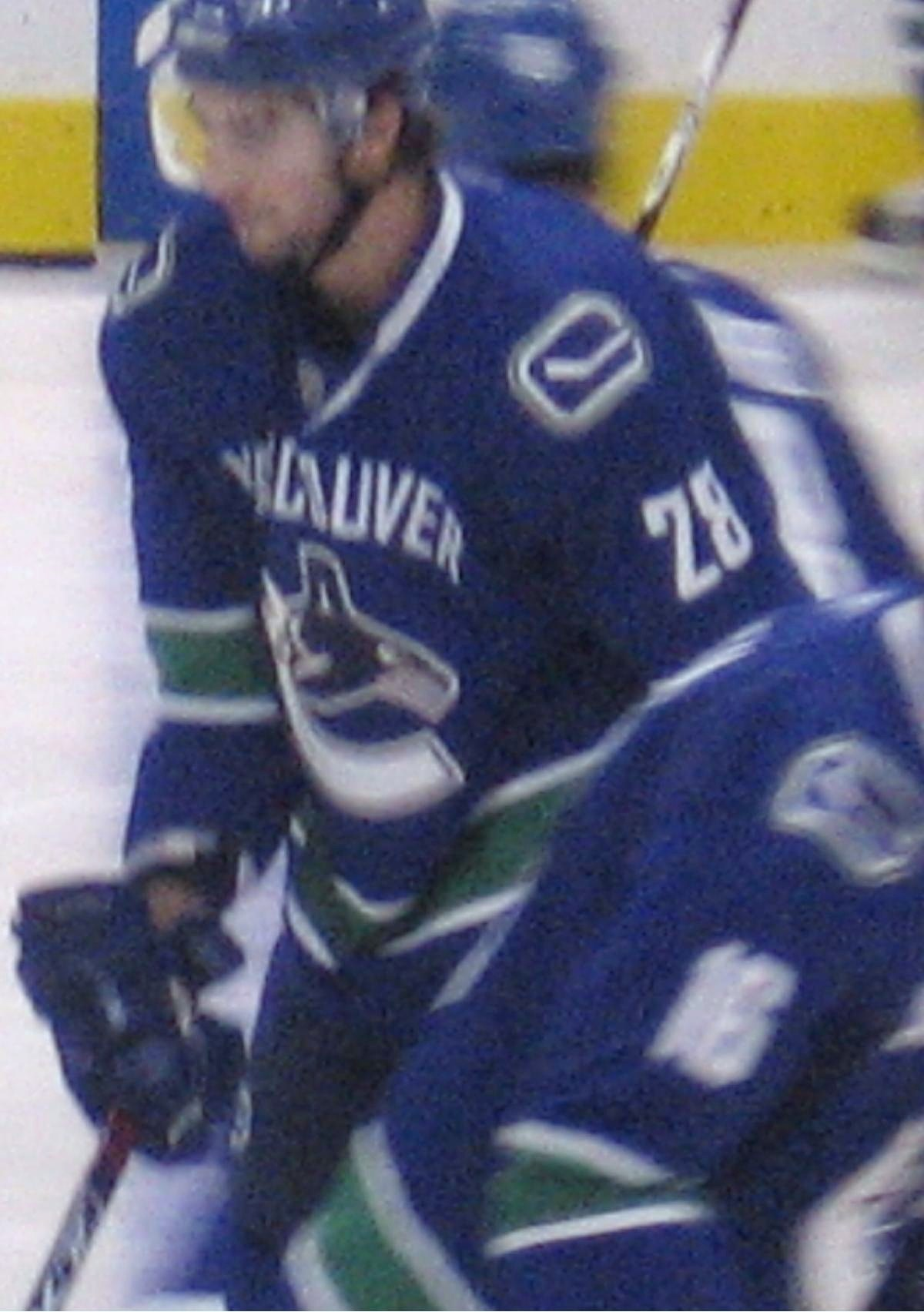
Bourdon warming up before a game on November 16, 2007. He scored his first NHL goal that night.

Invited to the Canucks training camp, Bourdon almost made the team as an 18-year-old, but instead was returned to the QMJHL for further development. He began the 2005–06 season with the Foreurs, registering 20 points in 20 games, before being traded to the Moncton Wildcats, who were hosting the 2006 Memorial Cup. In exchange for Bourdon, the Wildcats sent Ian Mathieu-Girard, Jean-Sébastien Adam, a fourth-round pick, and a first-round selection in 2008 to Val-d'Or. Shortly after the trade, Bourdon injured his ankle, suffering a fractured fibula, high and low sprains, and a second-degree ligament tear. Although he returned to join Moncton in the playoffs, doctors told him that it would take two years to fully recover. He managed a full recovery after one year, but his turning ability and backward skating sometimes lagged. Competing in the Memorial Cup, he reached the Canadian Hockey League (CHL) final with the Wildcats, who lost 6–2 to the Quebec Remparts.

After signing a three-year contract, worth $850,000 per year with the Canucks on May 4, 2006, Bourdon earned a spot on the team's 2006–07 opening roster. He played his first NHL game on October 10, 2006, against the Minnesota Wild, but after playing nine games and scoring no points, he was sent again to the QMJHL for further development. On January 8, 2007, Bourdon was again traded in the QMJHL, with Moncton sending him to the Cape Breton Screaming Eagles in exchange for Mark Barberio and a first-round selection in the 2007 QMJHL draft. As a Screaming Eagle, Bourdon lost in the QMJHL semi-final against his former team, Val-d'Or. He finished the 2006–07 QMJHL season with 20 points in 36 games. After his QMJHL season ended, the Canucks sent Bourdon to play five games for the Manitoba Moose, who were in the middle of the AHL playoffs. He was held pointless through five AHL playoff games. Including his participation in the 2007 World Junior Championships, Bourdon played for five different teams throughout the 2006–07 season.

Initially failing to make the Canucks starting roster out of training camp, Bourdon began the 2007–08 season with the Manitoba Moose; however, because of a series of injuries among the Canucks' defencemen throughout the season, Bourdon was called up on several occasions. Bourdon scored his first goal on November 16, 2007, against goaltender Niklas Bäckström in a 6–2 win over the Minnesota Wild. Bourdon finished the season on the Canucks roster and was sent back to the Manitoba Moose for the AHL playoffs, playing in six playoff games for the Moose. He appeared in 27 games for the Canucks over the season, scoring one more goal, as well as scoring 14 points during 41 games with the Moose.

As a young and promising defenceman, Bourdon was regularly mentioned in rumours of trades for more offence at the forward positions. Most significantly, he was speculated to be part of a package in exchange for Tampa Bay Lightning forward Brad Richards. Although Bourdon had a powerful shot, he did not play defence responsibly enough to earn a regular spot on the roster. He began to show signs of improvement and maturity as the Canucks used him more in the 2007–08 season.

== International play ==
Medal record

Representing Canada

Ice hockey

World Junior Championships
Gold medal – first place	2007	Sweden
Gold medal – first place	2006	Canada

World Junior U18 Championships
Silver medal – second place	2005	Czech Republic

Bourdon made his international debut representing Team Canada in the 2005 World Under-18 Championships, held in the Czech Republic, earning one assist in a silver-medal effort.

In the 2006 World Junior Ice Hockey Championships in British Columbia, Bourdon competed in his first of two consecutive World Junior Championships. He was named player of the game in round-robin play after a scoring a goal and an assist in a 4–0 win against Norway. He finished the tournament leading all defencemen in scoring with six points in six games and was named to the tournament's all-star team. Upon winning gold, Bourdon returned to Shippagan and showcased his medal at the local arena to crowds of supporters.

At the 2007 World Junior Championships in Leksand and Mora, Sweden, Bourdon was awarded a second player of the game distinction after the first round-robin contest against Sweden, in which he scored the game-winning goal in a 2–0 victory. Later in the tournament, Bourdon scored the game-tying goal in the third period of a 2–1 shootout win over the United States in the semi-final. In total, Bourdon picked up two goals and two assists in six games, helping Canada to a second straight gold medal.

== Death ==
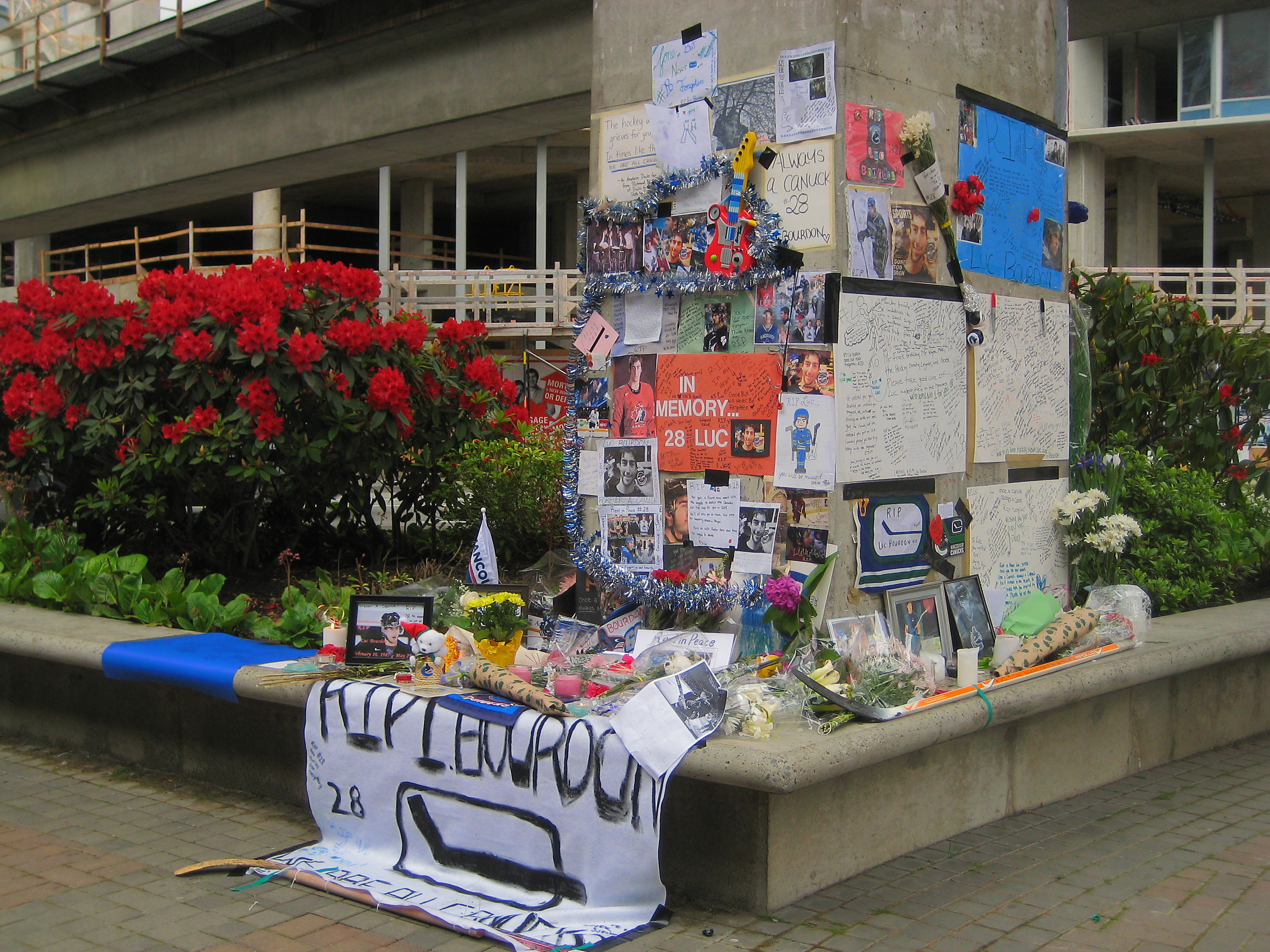
A view of the items at the Luc Bourdon memorial outside General Motors Place in Vancouver

Bourdon was killed instantly in a head-on motorcycle collision in Lamèque, New Brunswick, near his hometown of Shippagan on May 29, 2008, when he hit a tractor-trailer after losing control of his Suzuki GSX-R1000 and crossing the centre line. Environment Canada showed winds gusting to more than 50 km/h (31 mph) in the area at the time of the accident. The RCMP stated that Bourdon's inexperience with motorcycles may have been a factor in the crash.

Bourdon's agent, Kent Hughes, stated that he never knew about his client's new hobby (motorcycles). "I had no idea," he explained to CKNW in Vancouver. "Another client of ours, Kris Letang, said Luc let him know he was riding his dad's motorcycle with some friends a week or two ago. I have since been told—though I don't know—that he actually bought a motorcycle two days ago". Maryse Bourdon, Luc's stepmother, said he had purchased the motorcycle about three weeks before. Letang, Bourdon's close friend and former roommate from junior hockey planned to buy a motorcycle after Bourdon told him about his; because of the crash, he decided against it.

The American Hockey League, where Bourdon had played for the Manitoba Moose, observed a moment of silence in Bourdon's honour prior to game one of the Calder Cup Finals between the Chicago Wolves and the Wilkes-Barre/Scranton Penguins just hours after the accident, and on May 31, the Pittsburgh Penguins and Detroit Red Wings observed a moment of silence before game four of the 2008 Stanley Cup Finals. During the 2008 NHL Draft, the Canucks' management wore guitar pins to remember Bourdon, because he was an avid guitarist.

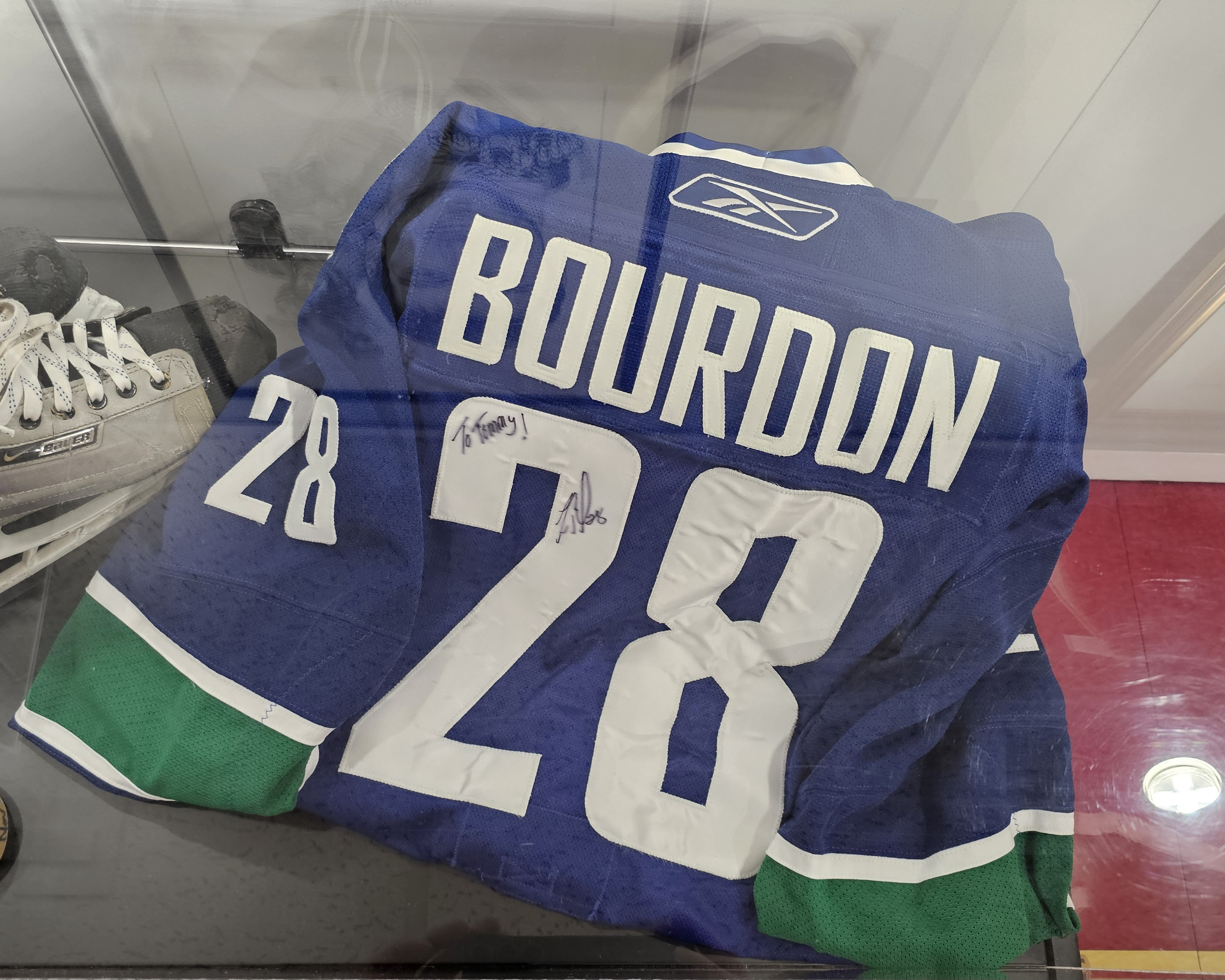
Bourdon's Vancouver Canucks jersey on display at the New Brunswick Sports Hall of Fame

At the Canucks' 2008–09 NHL season home opener against the Calgary Flames, the Canucks honoured Bourdon with a brief pre-game ceremony. Bourdon's family was presented with his last game-worn jersey, given by the fan who won the jersey during an annual charity event the previous season. Afterwards, Tom Cochrane and Red Rider performed "Big League" during the video tribute. Commemorative pins were handed out to fans attending the game and were worn throughout the season by General Motors Place hosts. The Canucks also wore "LB" on their helmets that season in memory of Bourdon. At General Motors Place, the Luc Bourdon Wall of Dreams was established to commemorate Bourdon.

The Manitoba Moose honoured Bourdon with a video tribute before their 2008–09 home opener on October 10, 2008. Moose players all wore #4 Bourdon jerseys during the warmup, and "#4 LB" patches were worn on the jerseys of players all season. A senior men's ice hockey team in New Brunswick, the Lameque/Shippagan Pêcheurs, also honoured him, wearing a "28 Bourdon" patch on their jerseys for the 2008–09 season. During the 2009 World Junior Ice Hockey Championships, Team Canada honoured Bourdon by wearing LB stickers in their opening game. In addition, no Canadian player wore the jersey number 6, the number Bourdon wore with the national team, throughout the tournament.

In the 2008–09 season, the QMJHL Moncton Wildcats hockey club, where Bourdon had played during the 2006 season, paid tribute by having Acadian singer Roland Gauvin, from the musical group 1755, play "Le monde a bien changé" along with a video tribute. The franchise presented the Bourdon family with Bourdon's Moncton Wildcats Jersey as well as flowers. The team wore an "LB" patch on their uniforms for that season.

== Career statistics ==
=== Regular season and playoffs ===
			Regular season					Playoffs
Season	Team	League	GP	G	A	Pts	PIM	GP	G	A	Pts	PIM
2002–03	Miramichi Rae's Yamaha Rivermen	NBMHL	20	2	12	14	106	—	—	—	—	—
2003–04	Val–d'Or Foreurs	QMJHL	64	2	6	8	58	7	1	0	1	4
2004–05	Val–d'Or Foreurs	QMJHL	70	13	19	32	117	—	—	—	—	—
2005–06	Val–d'Or Foreurs	QMJHL	20	2	18	20	54	—	—	—	—	—
2005–06	Moncton Wildcats	QMJHL	10	1	7	8	8	16	0	3	3	22
2005–06	Moncton Wildcats	M-Cup	—	—	—	—	—	5	0	2	2	10
2006–07	Vancouver Canucks	NHL	9	0	0	0	4	—	—	—	—	—
2006–07	Moncton Wildcats	QMJHL	13	3	11	14	28	—	—	—	—	—
2006–07	Cape Breton Screaming Eagles	QMJHL	23	1	5	6	45	16	2	11	13	28
2006–07	Manitoba Moose	AHL	—	—	—	—	—	5	0	0	0	2
2007–08	Vancouver Canucks	NHL	27	2	0	2	20	—	—	—	—	—
2007–08	Manitoba Moose	AHL	41	6	8	14	68	6	0	0	0	8
NHL totals			36	2	0	2	24	—	—	—	—	—

=== International ===
Year	Team	Event	GP	G	A	Pts	PIM
2004	Canada Atlantic	U17	5	0	1	1	26
2005	Canada	WJC18	6	0	1	1	4
2005	Canada	U18	5	0	1	1	2
2006	Canada	WJC	6	1	5	6	4
2007	Canada	WJC	6	2	2	4	6
Junior totals			28	3	10	13	42

- All statistics taken from NHL.com

== See also ==
- List of ice hockey players who died during their careers

Awards and achievements
Preceded by Cory Schneider	Vancouver Canucks first-round draft pick 2005	Succeeded by Michael Grabner
