= 1755 (band) =

Canadian band

- Origin: New Brunswick, Canada
- Genres: Folk, Country, Rock
- Years active: 1975–2025
- Labels: Presqu'île Records, ISBA Music Entertainment
- Members: Kenneth Saulnier; Pierre Robichaud; Roland Gauvin; Donald Boudreau; Ronald Dupuis

1755 (pronounced seventeen fifty-five) was an Acadian band formed in 1975 by Kenneth Saulnier, Pierre Robichaud, Roland Gauvin, Donald Boudreau and Ronald Dupuis.

== History ==
The band was named after the Great Deportation of 1755, during which Acadians were deported from Acadia (present day Maritimes), and it is associated with Acadie's passage into modernity and for generating a new consciousness of Acadian pride and identity. The Acadian poet Herménégilde Chiasson wrote that 1755 was "much more than a band" but rather "the chant of a generation" and that their songs and lyrics remain the "testimony of a period of tension and affirmation". The group is considered an icon of modern Acadian culture, and is credited for launching the modern Acadian musical scene at the international level and for influencing several Acadian artists and bands that came after them, such as Fayo or Dominique Dupuis.

The band officially broke up in 1984, but began to reunite to play shows and summer tours, especially during Acadian-related festivities such as National Acadian Day. A particularly notable show was at the Moncton Coliseum, during the first Acadian World Congress in 1994, which was filmed and turned into a live album Les retrouvailles de la famille and a video release on VHS and DVD. The band toured through New Brunswick in 2009.

After the band broke up, its members went on with their musical careers. Gauvin joined the band Les Méchants Maquereaux and released a solo album in 2005. He also co-wrote the music for the 1995 documentary Les années noires, about the Acadian deportation. In 2001, Saulnier released the solo album Heritage. Robichaud released two solo albums, in 1998 and 2004. Dupuis formed the Glamour Puss Blues Band.

In October 2025, 1755 played their last concert.

== Musical style ==
1755 combined folk, country and rock, with traditional folk song lyrics, or original compositions from the band members, or from Acadian poet Gérald Leblanc. Most of the band's songs were performed in the French dialect of south eastern New Brunswick, known as "chiac", but some compositions are in English as well.

== Discography ==
=== Albums ===
- 1755, 1978, Presqu'île Records
- Vivre à la Baie, 1979, Presqu'île Records
- Synergie, 1982, Le Barachois
- Les retrouvailles de la famille, Live Au Colisée De Moncton, 1994, ISBA Music Entertainment
- Yousque T'es Rendu? (re-release of Synergie), 1999, ISBA Music Entertainment
- Anthologie, 2012, Independent

=== EPs and singles ===
- "Le Monde A Bien Changé" / "Le Monde Qu'on Connait", 1978, Presqu'île Records
- "C.B Buddie" / "Hallo Joe", 1978, Presqu'île Records
- "Je T'Aime" / "Disco Banjo", 1979, Presqu'île Records

== Awards and honors ==
- At the 2008 East Coast Music Awards, 1755 received the Dr Helen Creighton Lifetime Achievement Award for their contribution to the music of the region.
