= Saddle River =

Saddle River may refer to:

- Saddle River (Alberta), a tributary of the Peace River in Alberta, Canada
- Saddle River (Passaic River tributary), New Jersey, U.S.
- Saddle River, New Jersey, a borough in Bergen County, New Jersey, U.S.
- Saddle River Township, a township in Bergen County, New Jersey
- Upper Saddle River, New Jersey, a borough in Bergen County, New Jersey
- Saddle River String Band, a bluegrass group from Prince Edward Island, Canada
