= Nathan Wiley =

Canadian musician

- Origin: Summerside, Prince Edward Island, Canada
- Genres: Rock, blues
- Occupation: Singer
- Website: www.nathanwiley.com

Nathan Wiley (born c. 1977) is a musician and singer from Summerside, Prince Edward Island, Canada, whose music blends modern rock and blues.

== History ==
Wiley started out as a guitarist in a handful of local independent projects, including Electric Deadhead, The Plan, Space Opera and Evil Agents. He was also a member of The Tubetracks during a brief period when he lived in British Columbia. His unique guitar style always contributed to the sound of the groups he worked with, most notably his adept skill at surf music, being heavily influenced by Dick Dale, among others. During his involvement in these groups, he did not do any vocal work, with the exception of a few songs from Space Opera, which mostly consisted of talking or yelling, but no actual singing.

== Solo ==
In 2002, he released his first solo project, Bottom Dollar. Not only was it his first solo effort, but it was a fully professionally produced CD, as opposed to the low-tech cassettes produced by all of his previous projects. While the surf influence wasn't evident, his talents as a singer and songwriter were startling, after so many years of being known as primarily a lead guitarist rather than a frontman. Some media reviews drew a comparison to Tom Waits, but most fans seem to agree that, while some of the lyrics are similar to Waits' style, a closer comparison in lyric style would be Bob Dylan.

Bottom Dollar gained much critical acclaim: Wiley won Definitely Not the Opera's Big Break Contest in 2002, and then won awards from the East Coast Music Association and SOCAN. Tracks from the album received repeated airplay on CBC Radio. The video for the lead single "Bottom Dollar Baby" was played in rotation on the Canadian music station MuchMoreMusic, and remained in their Top 40 for several weeks. The album was released through the indie-friendly group Sonic, and was eventually picked up for distribution by Warner Bros. Records.

The follow-up album High Low was released in 2004, and won him the Alternative Artist of the Year award from the East Coast Music Association.

In 2007, Wiley released his third album The City Destroyed Me.

== Band ==
His band consists of his uncles Dale DesRoches (drums) and Tom DesRoches (bass). Occasionally James Phillips is also featured on lead guitar. Together these musicians also perform as Sweetheart Jim and the Brothers Grim, performing original material written by Phillips as well as cover songs.

== Discography ==
- Bottom Dollar (2002)
- High Low (2004)
- The City Destroyed Me (2007)
