= Music of New Brunswick =

New Brunswick offers musical entertainment at different venues, including the Harvest Jazz & Blues Festival in Fredericton and Symphony New Brunswick, with its main series occurring in Saint John, Moncton and Fredericton.

== Festivals ==
New Brunswick's capital city is Fredericton, which is home to the annual Harvest Jazz & Blues Festival. The Nashwaak Music Festival is an annual event, featuring Country, Roots and Folk music. It is held every New Brunswick Day weekend 20 km north of Fredericton.

The Moncton music scene local Acadian and songwriters as well as concert festivals held at Magnetic Hill Concert Site.

Saint John's main music festival is Area 506, where each summer East Coast musicians gather dock side along the city's harbour.

The city of Miramichi is best known for its country and bluegrass music, featuring a blend of Acadian, Irish and Scot's traditional style of music. The Miramichi Folksong Festival preserves the history and rich musical traditions of northeastern New Brunswick.

Sappyfest is an annual independent festival held in Sackville, New Brunswick founded by Sappy Records.

== Country music ==
The introduction of radio to the province in the 1920s gave local country artists exposure to a wide audience, and several musicians parlayed this exposure into successful musical careers. Radio/television pioneer Don Messer debuted on Saint John station CFBO in 1929, later gaining fame as the host of the popular CBC program Don Messer's Jubilee. Fiddler Ned Landry made his first CFBO appearance in 1934, and would eventually record eight albums with RCA Victor in the 1950s.

New Brunswick has also produced several popular contemporary country artists, including Julian Austin and Chris Cummings.

== Notable artists ==
- Matt Andersen
- Measha Brueggergosman
- Edith Butler
- Stompin' Tom Connors
- Eric's Trip
- Don Messer
- Natasha St-Pier
- Roch Voisine
- Chris Colepaugh
- David Myles
- Maestro Fresh Wes
- Matt Minglewood
- Ken Tobias
- Myles Goodwyn
- Julie Doiron
- Jeremy Dutcher
- Brandon Kingston
