= East Coast Music Association =

Canadian nonprofit organization

- Formation: 1991; 35 years ago
- Headquarters: 1800 Argyle Street, Halifax, Nova Scotia
- Board Chair: Michelle Eagles
- CEO: Bob Hallett
- Website: https://ecma.com

The East Coast Music Association (ECMA) is a non-profit association purposed towards supporting the music industry in the Canadian east coast, i.e., Atlantic Canada. The ECMA hosts the annual East Coast Music Awards (formerly the Maritime Music Awards) festival.

The East Coast Music Awards have been a springboard for many Atlantic Canadians, including Sarah McLachlan, Ashley MacIsaac, Rawlins Cross, Lennie Gallant, Natalie MacMaster, Gordie Sampson, Joel Plaskett, The Rankin Family, Rita MacNeil, Bruce Guthro, J.P. Cormier and Great Big Sea.

Each year, the ECMA also awards one person with the Dr. Helen Creighton Lifetime Achievement Award to recognize an artist or band that has had a profound and lasting effect on the Atlantic Canadian music industry.

== Association history and mission ==
In 1989, Halifax music industry promoter Rob Cohn launched the Maritime Music Awards to celebrate music in the Canadian maritime region. Two years later, in 1991, Cohn joined forces with Sheri Jones, Karen Byers, Lee Stanley, Mike Barkhouse, Peter Hendrickson, Bruce Morel, and Tony Kelly to form the East Coast Music Association. The association's event thereby became known as the East Coast Music Awards and covered all of the provinces in Atlantic Canada.

Today, as of 2023, the ECMA's mission is "to develop, advance and celebrate East Coast Canadian music, its artists and its industry professionals throughout the region and around the world," as well as advocating "for [its] members to ensure they can sustain music careers while based in Canada's Atlantic region."

The ECMA is a registered non-profit association. Membership is open to all individuals working in any sector of the music industry, or those who support the music industry. Membership includes musicians, artists, agents, managers, record companies, studios, media, related corporation and retailers. As of 2021, it has over 1,000 members.

In 2013, Front Row Insurance Brokers Inc. initiated an online musical instrument insurance program for members of the ECMA.

== East Coast Music Awards ==
East Coast Music Awards
- Status: Active
- Location: Atlantic Canada
- Established: 1989
- Next event: May 20–24, 2026
- Organizer: East Coast Music Association
- Website: ecma.com

The East Coast Music Awards (formerly the Maritime Music Awards) is an annual festival hosted by the ECMA to celebrate the music industry in Atlantic Canada.

The Awards have been a springboard for many Atlantic Canadians, including Sarah McLachlan, Ashley MacIsaac, Rawlins Cross, Lennie Gallant, Natalie MacMaster, Gordie Sampson, Joel Plaskett, The Rankin Family, Rita MacNeil, Bruce Guthro, J.P. Cormier, and Great Big Sea.

The awards were created in 1989 by Halifax music industry promoter Rob Cohn as the "Maritime Music Awards". The inaugural award show took place on April 10, 1989, in the Flamingo Café and Lounge in Halifax, Nova Scotia, to focus on the diversity of music and musicians in mainland Nova Scotia, Cape Breton, Prince Edward Island, and New Brunswick. Inaugural hosts were JC Douglas and Andrew Gillis of Q104 radio in Halifax.

The awards were renamed in 1991 with the formation of the East Coast Music Association, now including Newfoundland and Labrador. The event moved from The Flamingo Cafe & Lounge to the Rebecca Cohn Auditorium at the Dalhousie Arts Centre and new awards were added.

While being held in Halifax for the first few years, the East Coast Music Awards has been hosted by other Atlantic Canadian cities since 1994, as with the formation of provincial music industry associations, it was decided that the event would move each year, revolving from province to province. The East Coast Music Awards: Festival and Conference is now a five-day event. Since 2002, its awards gala has been aired in a two-hour national broadcast on CBC Television.

=== Dr. Helen Creighton Lifetime Achievement Award ===
Each year, the ECMA also awards one person with the Dr. Helen Creighton Lifetime Achievement Award. The award recognizes an artist or band that has had a profound and lasting effect on the Atlantic Canadian music industry; the recipient is chosen by the ECMA board of directors. Helen Creighton (1899-1989), after whom the award is named, was an author and pioneer in the field of folklore, both nationally and internationally. In 1958, she was one of the judges at the first Miramichi Folksong Festival, organized by Louise Manny. Recipients of this award include Stompin' Tom Connors (1993), Édith Butler (1997) and Don Messer (1998).

=== Award programs ===
Maritime Music Awards
Year	Host city	Details	Winners
1989	Halifax, Nova Scotia	The first Maritime Music Awards took place at The Flamingo Cafe & Lounge, which won Best Venue of the Year. There were just seven awards. Sarah McLachlan received three nominations and performed at the event, which was broadcast on Community Access TV Cable 10.	100 Flowers, Rita MacNeil, Haywire, Matt Minglewood and John Gracie
1990	Halifax, Nova Scotia	This year, Cohn held the awards at the Crazy Horse Cabaret and were offered in eight categories. Performers at the ceremony included Matt Minglewood's Jam Band.	Rita MacNeil, Anne Murray, John Gracie, Brett Ryan, and the band ICU
East Coast Music Awards
1991	Halifax, Nova Scotia	Halifax, Nova Scotia. There were 12 categories at the inaugural East Coast Music Awards.	Rita MacNeil, Stompin' Tom Connors, The Rankin Family, Brett Ryan, Figgy Duff and local bands Black Pool and The Floorboards
1992	Halifax, Nova Scotia	For the second East Coast Music Awards, a trade show was added and there were 13 categories.	Barra MacNeils, Joan Kennedy, The Rankin Family, Sarah McLachlan, Natalie MacMaster, Lennie Gallant, John Campbell, and the band Real World
1993	Halifax, Nova Scotia	At these awards, The Stompin’ Tom Connors Award was created when Stompin’ Tom Connors was presented with the Dr. Helen Creighton Lifetime Achievement Award. He preferred to return the award and have an award be created to honour those who have made a significant, or long-term contribution to the East Coast Music Awards Industry.	Anita Best, Pamela Morgan, Terry Kelly, The Rankin Family, Rita MacNeil, Rawlins Cross, and Émile Benoît (posthumously) The Dr. Helen Creighton Lifetime Achievement Award was given to Stompin’ Tom Connors (who returned it)
1994	St. John's, Newfoundland and Labrador	The number of awards for this year increased to 16.	Natalie MacMaster, The Hardship Post, Roger Howse and Ruff Ideas, The Rankin Family, Ron Hynes, Sarah McLachlan, the Holly Cole Trio, The Irish Descendants and Lennie Gallant
1995	Sydney, Nova Scotia	This year had 17 categories.	Lennie Gallant, Eric's Trip, Symphony Nova Scotia, The Irish Descendants, Rita MacNeil, Theresa Malenfant, Ashley MacIsaac, Rawlins Cross, Chris Mitchell, Les Méchants Maquereaux and the Barra MacNeils
1996	Charlottetown, Prince Edward Island	This year's event, with 19 categories, was held at the Eastlink Centre, which allowed it to swell to 4,000 people.	Lee Cremo, Annick Gagnon, Ray Legere, Laura Smith, Sloan, the Saint John String Quartet, Stompin’ Tom Connors, Great Big Sea, Goodspeed and Staples Quartet, Dave MacIsaac, The Rankin Family, Duncan Wells and the Barra MacNeils.
1997	Moncton, New Brunswick	This year, 7,000 guests attended the televised broadcast in Moncton, with special guest Édith Butler and broadcaster Peter Gzowski. The event attracted 1,500 delegates, including 200 media from around the world, and injected $3-million into the local economy. There was a 76-hour jam session, a Cape Breton Rave Night and a concert series featuring Great Big Sea, Four the Moment, Barachois and Bruce Guthro, who signed with EMI Music Canada that week-end. This year had 20 categories.	Sloan, Ashley MacIsaac, Natalie MacMaster, Barachois, Teresa Doyle, Puirt a Baroque, Terry Kelly, Great Big Sea, Mary Jane Lamond, Jeri Brown, the Nova Scotia Mass Choir, Bruce Guthro, children's entertainers Audrey and Alex, and the bluegrass group Exit 13.
1998	Halifax, Nova Scotia	This year had 26 categories.	Sarah McLachlan, Exit 13, Four the Moment, the Glamour Puss Blues Band, Great Big Sea, The Super Friendz, Lennie Gallant, Symphony Nova Scotia with Georg Tintner, the Johnny Favourite Swing Orchestra, Julian Austin, J.P. Cormier, Jamie Sparks, Richard Wood, Michelle Boudreau Samson, Sam the Record Man, graphic designer Carol Kennedy, media members Greg Guy and Mike Campbell, sound technician David Hillier, and production company Tour Tech East.
1999	St. John's, Newfoundland and Labrador		Este Mundo, Gordie Sampson, Blou, The John Campbelljohn Trio, Bruce Guthro, Sol, children's entertainers Kidd Brothers, David MacDonald, Great Big Sea, Natalie MacMaster, Shirley Eikhard, The Rankin Family, Rawlins Cross, and Denise Murray.
2000	Sydney, Nova Scotia	This was an economically successful event that allowed the ECMA to gain a sound financial footing. It commemorated the influence of The Rankin Family, Cape Breton's Celtic music family, and launched Radio freECMA, a low-power radio station that, in a partnership with the government of Prince Edward Island, provided coverage over the Internet. It also launched Continuous Jam, a three-day musical extravaganza featuring sets from all genres and from all levels of Atlantic Canadian talent. At the 15th Gemini Awards, the awards show won Best Music, Variety Program or Series.	
2001	Charlottetown, Prince Edward Island	Attracted more than 1,700 delegates and debuted the Jazz/Classical Concert Series. The event fostered interest in the formation of the Prince Edward Island Music Awards and introduced Soundwaves, a program that sees musicians visiting schools throughout P.E.I., and hospitals, businesses and churches in Charlottetown. Over this weekend, the Ennis Sisters signed a two-record deal with Warner Music Canada. At the 16th Gemini Awards, the awards show won Best Music, Variety Program or Series.	
2002	Saint John, New Brunswick	The competitive bid process in New Brunswick sparked community involvement and drew over 2200 delegates. New initiatives were an industry awards brunch, the Warner Roots Room for acoustic performances, the UniSon bilingual concert, and the bluegrass stage that attracted an estimated 5,000 fans. In addition to the national CBC Television broadcast of the awards show, the MuchMusic ECMA Rock stage got a prime-time special on Much, and CBC Radio's Definitely Not the Opera broadcast live from the main stage.	The Dr. Helen Creighton Lifetime Achievement Award was presented to famed fiddler Ned Landry.
2003	Halifax, Nova Scotia	The conference celebrated its 15-year anniversary with the City of Stages, or 14 live stages. Approximately 2000 delegates attended. The Soundwaves Program brought music to 30,000 students throughout the region, and corporate sponsorship and support for ECMA reached new heights. An Urban Music Series featuring hip-hop, R&B and the Black Vibes Showcase were initiated. ECMA 2003 brought international bookings to several East Coast artists as European music industry professionals were in attendance. At the 18th Gemini Awards, the awards show was nominated for Best Music, Variety Program or Series.	
2004	St. John's, Newfoundland and Labrador	A strategic partnership was developed with the Atlantic Film Festival, and film and TV elements were introduced to the conference. A number of East Coast recording artists negotiated contracts for national licensing and distribution deals. The ECMA Songwriters Circle was broadcast live across the country on CBC Radio and across Atlantic Canada on CBC Television. The Government of Newfoundland & Labrador noted that the awards represented a regional economic impact of $6 million.	
2005	Sydney, Nova Scotia	This was the first major event held at the new Membertou Trade and Convention Centre and the Sydney Marine Terminal. The conference included a new international program (50+ delegates) and successful partnering with Cape Breton University. The ECMA began moving towards a master class format, presenting classes in songwriting, export readiness and musical scoring for gaming and television. The success of the Soundwaves was parlayed into a new program, Sound-off, a band competition among schools across Cape Breton.	The lifetime achievement award was presented to legendary fiddler Buddy MacMaster.
2006	Charlottetown, Prince Edward Island	For the first time, organizers held the gala dinner and industry awards ceremony on Saturday night. The Songwriters' Circle and the Rogers Television Yamaha 72-Hour Jam were featured events; the CBC moved the televised broadcast from Sunday night to Monday night. At the 2006 Gemini Awards, the event's hosts—Trailer Park Boys' Mike Smith, Robb Wells and John Paul Tremblay—were nominated for Best Performance or Host in a Variety Program or Series.	
2007	Halifax, Nova Scotia	For the first time, the event was introduced as the "East Coast Music Awards, Festival and Conference." The four-day conference had 50+ international music industry delegates. The show marked the recent passing of East Coast legends John Allan Cameron, Dutch Mason and Denny Doherty. The three Trailer Park Boys stars returned as hosts.	
2008	Fredericton, New Brunswick	The focus this year was on Aboriginal musical talent, via the Aboriginal Partnered Showcase. The music awards gala was held at the Aitken Centre, and Steven Page from the Barenaked Ladies hosted the entire event (coining the term "Barenaked East Coast Music"). This year's event was not televised; instead, a TV special was broadcast with scenes of venues, awards presentations and hotel antics. New this year was the Stompin' Tom Award, dedicated to the unsung heroes of Atlantic music. Stompin' Tom Connors created the concept for this award in 1993 to pay homage to musicians that have made long-term contributions to the East coast music industry, and artists from each Maritime province were honoured. A 2009 study found that, in 2007 and 2008, the ECMA generated a local economic impact of $8 million, not including sales by artists and companies.	The year's big winner was Joel Plaskett Emergency who won seven awards, most centering on his acclaimed concept release Ashtray Rock. The Dr. Helen Creighton Lifetime Achievement Award was presented to the Acadian group 1755. The Stompin' Tom Award was given to Ivan and Vivian Hicks (New Brunswick), The Ducats (Newfoundland and Labrador), The Tremtones (Prince Edward Island), Oakley (Mainland Nova Scotia), and Aldun MacVicar (Cape Breton).
2009	Corner Brook, Newfoundland and Labrador	The hosts for the event were Damhnait Doyle and Jian Ghomeshi of CBC Radio One's Q. The show began with a skit featuring Premier Danny Williams. The show featured the reunion of Rawlins Cross, and introduced the ECMA Fan's Choice Award, presented to Nova Scotia rapper Classified.	Multiple award-winners were Hey Rosetta!, Jill Barber, Gordie Sampson and Matt Andersen. The Dr. Helen Creighton Lifetime Achievement Award was posthumously awarded to the Corner Brook country and western pioneer Dick Nolan.
2010	Sydney, Nova Scotia	This year, the program was titled the "Bell Aliant 2010 East Coast Music Awards presented by RBC", held at Centre 200.	Multiple award-winners were Catherine MacLellan, In-Flight Safety, The Motorleague, and Joel Plaskett, who won 6 awards, including Sennheiser Entertainer of the Year. The Rankin Family was honoured with the Director's Special Achievement Award for their extraordinary contribution to East Coast music. The Dr. Helen Creighton Lifetime Achievement Award was posthumously awarded to Scott Turner, whose son Trevor Turnball played four of his songs.
2011	Charlottetown, Prince Edward Island	The East Coast Music Association changed program's format this year: the number of awards was down to 28, and they were presented on different days, and at different venues and concerts around the city, culminating with the "Bell Aliant 2011 East Coast Music Awards Gala presented by RBC." This was the first year of A Sound Celebration, which brings together pop stars and musicians from orchestras. This year, it was PEI artists Jenn Grant, Meaghan Blanchard, Paper Lions, Richard Wood, Vishtèn and Symphony Nova Scotia.	
2012	Moncton, New Brunswick	This year saw the launch of the ECMA Breakout Stage, a new program for emerging artists that uses workshops and performances to foster new artists. ECMA partnered with the Province of New Brunswick and the local Capitol Theatre to host a First Nation's showcase. Roch Voisine hosted the gala, which was streamed live from Casino New Brunswick. A Sound Celebration brought together musicians from Atlantic Simphonia, Symphony New Brunswick and the New Brunswick Youth Orchestra, Chris Colepaugh, David Myles, Samantha Robichaud and Matt Andersen.	Multiple winners were Anderson, Myles, Hey Rosetta!, Keith Mullins and Scott MacMillan. Jimmy Rankin led with eight nominations but won the Fans’ Choice Video of the Year award. Roch Voisine was presented with the Director's Special Achievement Award. Catherine McKinnon was presented with The Dr. Helen Creighton Lifetime Achievement Award.
2013 (see 2013 East Coast Music Awards)	Halifax, Nova Scotia	Over 1,100 musicians applied to perform on the event's 10 stages. There were 39 categories this year. The program was co-hosted by Rose Cousins and David Myles. The event also featured a video tribute to country music legend Stompin' Tom Connors, who died a few days before the event	Lone Cloud, Cam Smith, Matt Mays, Charlie A`Court, Donna & Andy, Derek Charke, Helen Pridmore and Wesley Ferreira, RyLee Madison, English Words, The Stanfields, George Canyon, Rose Cousins, Vishtèn, Stephanie Mainville, Joel Miller, Jenn Grant, Radio Radio, Joel Plaskett, Ben Caplan, Tim Chaisson, The Once, Dave Gunning, Natalie MacMaster, Gypsophilia, The Halifax Pop Explosion, Lakewind Sound Studios, sound engineers Jamie Foulds and David Hillier, manager Louis Thomas, producer Daniel Ledwell, Fred's Records, radio host Jimmie Inch, graphic designer Jud Haynes, CBC Mainstreet Nova Scotia and The Carleton Music Bar & Grill.
2014	Charlottetown, Prince Edward Island	The Awards Gala was hosted by Seamus O'Regan.	Multiple winners included Old Man Luedecke and Dave Gunning. Rita MacNeil, who died in 2013, was posthumously honoured with the Directors' Special Achievement Award. The Dr. Helen Creighton Lifetime Achievement Award went to The Chaisson Trio; the Industry Builder Award to Grady Poe; and the Musician's Achievement Award to Jay Smith, who also died in 2013. The Stompin' Tom Award was awarded to Flo Sampson, Alan Dowling, Kellie Walsh, Susan Hunter and Bob Mersereau.
2015	St. John's, Newfoundland and Labrador.	As an experiment, this year's awards gala, hosted by Jonny Harris, was held on the Thursday night, rather than the Sunday.	Multiple award-winners were The Town Heroes, Chelsea Amber, and Hey Rosetta!.
2016	Sydney, Nova Scotia	The Awards Gala was hosted by Ashley MacIsaac and Heather Rankin.	Multiple award-winners were Hey Rosetta!, Natalie MacMaster & Donnell Leahy, and Amelia Curran.
2017	Saint John, New Brunswick	This year, the East Coast Music Association received the National Arts Centre Award for Distinguished Contribution to Touring in the Performing Arts, for its long-standing commitment to promoting touring by musicians from Atlantic Canada, both at home and abroad. The awards show was hosted by the British comedian James Mullinger, who now lives in Atlantic Canada.	Multiple award-winners were Classified, Ria Mae and Lennie Gallant.
2018	Halifax, Nova Scotia	This event marked the 30th Anniversary of the ECMAs. Allister MacGillivray's "Song For The Mira" was inducted into the Canadian Songwriters Hall of Fame.	Multiple awards went to folk singer Rose Cousins. The Directors' Special Achievement Award was posthumously awarded to Kevin MacMichael. The Dr. Helen Creighton Lifetime Achievement Award was given to music promoter Lynn Horne.
2019	Charlottetown, Prince Edward Island		Multiple awards went to Classified and Jeremy Dutcher. Peter Chaisson won the Musician's Achievement Award and Music PEI Executive Director Rob Oakie won the Stompin' Tom Award. Lennie Gallant, whose song "Peter's Dream" was inducted into the Canadian Songwriters Hall of Fame, received the Directors' Special Achievement Award.
2020	St. John's, Newfoundland and Labrador	Because of the COVID-19 pandemic, the event included socially-distanced festivities and concerts, and a pre-recorded awards broadcast. During the broadcast, Ron Hynes was posthumously inducted into the Canadian Songwriters Hall of Fame.	
	Sydney, Nova Scotia (Virtual)	Plans to hold an in-person conference and awards broadcast were once again thwarted by the COVID-19 pandemic, and a virtual conference was held on June 9-13, 2021. The awards ceremonies were broadcast on YouTube, during which Rita MacNeil was posthumously inducted into the Canadian Songwriters Hall of Fame.	The Dr. Helen Creighton Lifetime Achievement Award was received by Joella Foulds. The Fans' Choice Entertainer of the Year went to Beòlach.
2022	Fredericton, New Brunswick	The annual conference and awards ceremony was held in person and broadcast online in Fredricton, New Brunswick from May 4-8, 2022. The band 1755 were inducted into the Canadian Songwriters Hall of Fame.	Hillsburn was presented with a total of three awards. The Director's Special Achievement award went to Patsy Gallant. The Dr. Helen Creighton Lifetime Achievement Award was received by Cutting Crew.
2023	Halifax, Nova Scotia	The 35th anniversary edition of the East Coast Music Awards and Conference will take place in person in Halifax, Nova Scotia, from May 3-7, 2023. Nominees were announced on January 24, 2023, with Nova Scotia's Classified and Prince Edward Island's The East Pointers each receiving a leading six nominations.	The East Pointers were the big winners at the 35th anniversary of the East Coast Music Awards with three awards. David Myles & Kellie Loder received two awards each. Dr. Helen Creighton Lifetime Achievement Award was accepted by folk rock group Rawlins Cross.
2024	Charlottetown, Prince Edward Island	The 36th anniversary edition of the East Coast Music Awards and Conference will take place in person in Charlottetown, Prince Edward Island, from May 1-5, 2024. Leading nominees included hometown band, The East Pointers with seven nominations, Newfoundland and Labrador's Tim Baker and Jenn Grant with six nominations each.	Charlottetown's The East Pointers took home three awards. Morgan Toney, Tim Baker, and Jenn Grant received two awards each with the latter taking home Songwriter of the Year. The recipient of the Director's Special Achievement Award was the late Bruce Guthro. The Dr. Helen Creighton Lifetime Achievement Award was awarded to legendary Blues musician and founding director of the Music Industry Association of Newfoundland and Labrador, Denis Parker.
2025	St. John's, Newfoundland and Labrador	The 37th annual East Coast Music Awards and Conference took place in St. John's, Newfoundland and Labrador, from May 7-11, 2025. It is the first time that the awards were hosted in Newfoundland and Labrador in person since 2015. The 2020 festival and conference were cancelled and moved to a socially-distanced version of the event in July due to restrictions set by the COVID-19 pandemic. The lead-up to the awards gala and conference were mired in controversy. Sweeping changes to the awards applications and categories made by ECMA CEO, Blanche Israel lead to backlash in the East Coast Music Community. Founding director, Sheri Jones launched a petition citing the lack of consultations and transparency with the membership. Israel would be fired by the East Coast Music Association in January 2025 Jeremy Dutcher and Classified led nominations with eight each. Jah'Mila, Maggie Andrew, Vishtèn, and Kellie Loder all had five nominations each. Dutcher would then later withdraw his nominations in support of other musicians that would boycott the ECMAS.	Classified walked home with the most awards with five. Vishtèn would take home three awards, which includes their first album of the year honors for Expansions. Kellie Loder completed a sweep of the Fans Choice Awards taking home both Entertainer of the Year and Video of the Year. Maggie Andrew would also be the recipient of two ECMAs. Old Man Luedecke would talk home Songwriter of the Year. The Dr. Helen Creighton Lifetime Achievement Award would be accepted by The Ennis Sisters. The Director's Special Achievement Award went to the late Mount Pearl country musician, Chris Ryan. The East Coast Music Awards would kick off with a performance from local legends, Shanneyganock. It was the first performance for the group since losing co-founder Mark Hiscock at the age of 53.
2026	Sydney, Nova Scotia	The 38th annual East Coast Music Awards and Conference will take place in Sydney Nova Scotia from May 20-24, 2026.	

== See also ==
- Music of Canada
- Music of the Maritimes
