= Road to Saddle River =

- Directed by: Francis Damberger
- Written by: Francis Damberger
- Produced by: Francis Damberger; Arvi Liimatainen; Graydon McCrea; Dale Phillips
- Starring: Paul Jarrett; Michael Hogan; Paul Coeur; Eric Allan Kramer
- Cinematography: Peter Wunstorf
- Edited by: Michel Lalonde
- Music by: Darcy Phillips
- Production companies: Damberger Film & Cattle
- Release date: 1994
- Running time: 110 minutes
- Country: Canada
- Language: English

Road to Saddle River is a Canadian comedy film, directed by Francis Damberger and released in 1994. The film stars Paul Jarrett as "The Cowboy Kid", an Eastern European immigrant to Canada who settles in Alberta and undertakes a road trip in search of Saddle River, his idealized vision of the perfect place to establish his desired cowboy lifestyle. His travelling companions are Sam (Paul Coeur), an unhappy salesman afflicted with ringworm; Dieter (Eric Allan Kramer), a German tourist; and Norman Manyheads (Sam Bob), a young First Nations man who idolizes Elvis Presley.

The cast includes Michael Hogan, Ben Cardinal, Bryan Fustukian and Tina Lameman.

The film was originally shot in 1992, immediately after Damberger's prior film Solitaire, but Damberger was unable to secure distribution until 1994. It had at least one film festival screening before premiering commercially on September 23, 1994 in Edmonton.

The film received a 20th anniversary screening in 2013 as part of Alberta Culture Days.

== Awards ==
The film received two Genie Award nominations at the 15th Genie Awards, for Best Overall Sound (Dean Giammarco, Paul Sharpe, Garrell Clark, Bill Sheppard) and Best Sound Editing (Marti Richa, Eric Hill, Shane Shemko, Cal Shumiatcher, Jacqueline Cristianini). It won two Rosie Awards, for Best Dramatic Screenplay (Damberger) and Best Cinematography (Peter Wunstorf).

The folk music group Saddle River String Band took their name from the film.
