= Saddle River String Band =

Canadian bluegrass band

- Origin: Summerside, Prince Edward Island, Canada
- Genres: Bluegrass, blues, folk, country, ragtime
- Years active: 2005–present
- Label: Sunzahorse
- Members: Mike Dixon; James Phillips; Troy McArthur; Tom DesRoches
- Past members: Catherine MacLellan

Saddle River String Band is a Canadian bluegrass quartet, with influences of blues and folk from Summerside, Prince Edward Island, Canada. Their sound derives from their guitar/banjo/mandolin/double bass set up (sometimes with kazoo, harmonica or ukulele) and from their insistence on performing into a single condenser microphone like earlier bluegrass & folk acts.

== History ==
Saddle River began as a Summerside, Prince Edward Island-area group, getting their name from the Canadian film Road to Saddle River. Playing mostly for fun, the group explored the traditions of old-time country, blues, ragtime and bluegrass. Their enthusiasm carried over to their audiences, and the group began to take on a life of its own.

The original line-up from 2003-2006 included James Phillips (mandolin, guitar), Troy McArthur (banjo), Catherine MacLellan (guitar) and Mike Dixon (guitar, kazoo). Summerside bassist Tom DesRoches replaced MacLellan in 2006.

The band has been part of the Canadian East Coast folk and bluegrass scene. Their gumbo of North Americana folk music is hinged particularly on pre-war blues and old-time music styles. The band play songs written by Charlie Patton, Lead Belly, Tampa Red, Son House, and Robert Johnson. They also play country, old-time and bluegrass standards and original tunes that range from contemporary to traditional takes on classic material.

Before Saddle River, among other things, James Phillips and Catherine McLellan played in The New Drifts, a folk-rock band and Mike Dixon and Troy McArthur were the acoustic blues duo, the Rattlesnakin' Daddies. Tom DesRoches had a long career as a professional musician playing in country and rock bands all over PEI. Elements of these bands and a burgeoning interest in roots music, spurned on by early 1990s pre-war blues revival and a bluegrass and old-time renaissance, coupled with the group's love for the music of Neil Young, Bob Dylan, Steve Earle created the Saddle River sound.

Artists covered by the Saddle River String Band include Jimmie Rodgers, The Carter Family, Bill Monroe, Hank Williams, Rose Maddox, Mississippi John Hurt, Charlie Patton, Blind Lemon Jefferson, Robert Johnson, Mississippi Fred McDowell and Chuck Berry.

In 2007-2008, the band won PEI Music Awards for Best New Artist & Bluegrass/Country Recording, an East Coast Music Award (ECMA) for Bluegrass Recording & was shortlisted for a Grammy nomination in the Bluegrass Recording category.

In 2012, SRSB released their sophomore effort, Ain't Done Dyin'.

== Discography ==
- Saddle River Stringband (2007)
- Ain't Done Dyin' (2012)

== Awards ==
- 2007-2008: PEI Music Awards Best Bluegrass Recording & Best New Artist (Saddle River String Band) (won)
- 2008: East Coast Music Awards Bluegrass Recording of the Year (Saddle River String Band) (won)
