= Blou (band) =

Nova Scotian musical group

Blou is a band from Meteghan, Nova Scotia, founded in 1994. The group claims a unique style of music they call 'Acadico' – a mix of Acadian, Cajun and Zydeco styles. The group takes its name from the street where founding member Patrice Boulianne resides: L'Allée des Blou was named after an aboriginal man purported to have lived at the end of that street 100 years earlier.

The original band members were Patrice Boulianne (accordion, guitar, vocals), Paul Melanson (guitar, mandolin, vocals), Len LeBlanc (harmonica, guitar, percussion, vocals), Owen Muise (electric bass, drum, vocals), and drummer Tommy Maillet.

== History ==
In 1998, Blou self-produced its first recording, Acadico. This was the first CD by an Acadian artist that had a European distribution, and it won the band the East Coast Music Association's 1999 award for Acadian Recording of the Year.

In 2000, Blou released its second album, Rhythm 'N Blou, which had a more upbeat sound than Acadico. This album brought two 2001 East Coast Music Association nominations, for Acadian Recording of the Year, and Roots/Traditional Recording of the Year. and the band toured internationally. In 2003, Blou released their third album, Blou Blanc Rouge, which brought a 2004 East Coast Music Award for Francophone Recording of the Year, and nominations for 2004 Entertainer of the Year and 2005 Roots/Traditional Group Recording of the Year. Also that year, Blou won the Prix ZOF-PassepArt-TV5 award. On October 17, 2005, Blou released the first single, Come Away Café from their fourth album, Pied-à-terre. The album was released in February 2006, and brought the 2007 East Coast Music Association award for Francophone Recording of the Year, and a nomination for Entertainer of the Year. In 2010, Blou recorded a Christmas album with Montreal's Choeur du Nouveau Monde. The album, Noël Blou, won the East Coast Music Association's award for Francophone Recording of the Year in 2010 and, in 2011, was nominated DVD of the year. Also in 2011, Blou was nominated the ECMA's Fan's Choice Entertainer of the Year, an award it would win in 2012.

== Discography ==
- Acadico (1998)
- Rhythm 'n Blou (2000)
- Blou Blanc Rouge (2003)
- Pied-à-terre (2006)
- Tringgle (2006)
- Noël Blou (with Choeur du Nouveau Monde) (2010)
