= Island Media Arts Cooperative =

Island Media Arts
- Founded: 2021 (Island Media Arts); 1982
- Purpose: Provide talent, resources, equipment, and space for productions on Prince Edward Island.
- Location: Charlottetown, PE, Canada
- Region served: Prince Edward Island
- Owner: Island Media Arts
- Key people: Jesse (Executive Director); Anchor(President); None (Vice President)

The Island Media Arts is a non-profit media organization that began with the Island which was incorporated in 1978 in Charlottetown, Prince Edward Island, Canada. The Island Media Arts evolved in 1982 when the co-op became oriented toward film production. Since then IMAC has operated as a non-profit filmmaker's organization. Though the emphasis on film has changed over time to branch into a wider array of media arts disciplines, the objectives have remained the same; to provide a space where artists can hone their skills and exchange ideas.

The formation of IMAC came about because of the need on Prince Edward Island for accessible film production facilities, the development of creative and technical skill pools, and the availability of information integral to the art and its industry.

From the beginning, IMAC has served as a developmental production organization. Its commitment has enabled it to make the most of the limited resources available and demonstrated the need for its continuation well into the future.

== About ==
The Co-op is a member driven non-profit independent media arts organization with a strong production mandate. They offer an atmosphere of participation, self-advancement, and program involvement. The primary purpose of IMAC is to assist emerging, mid-career, and established media artists in their production efforts by providing a pool of talent, resources, workshops, programming structures, equipment and space. Through these avenues they inspire interest in, and support of, all aspects of the media arts to a community that otherwise would find these forms of expression less accessible and less affordable.

IMAC supports and sustains a variety of initiatives that stimulate artistic expression through the media arts. IMAC provides workshops, production grants, production assistance, reduced-rate equipment rentals, dissemination initiatives, festivals, screenings and community. The facilities offer equipment for film and video production including cameras, lighting and sound equipment, editing suites for video and film, various other resources, and support staff, among many others.

== Location ==
From 1978 to 1988 the offices of IMAC were located on the third floor of the Security Building at 92 Queen Street in Charlottetown. In April 1988 the co-op moved to the second floor of the Security Building. The larger office consisted of five rooms with approximately 1,000 sq ft (93 m^{2}). of floor space. The new location slowly filled with much needed equipment and the rooms provided members with processing facilities for editing, sound and animation.

As IMAC membership and production increased considerably over the years, the co-op was once again outgrowing its new space.

In 1995 the co-op moved into its current location in the Arts Guild building on the corner of Richmond and Queen Streets as part of a collective arts initiative. There were many advantages to this move. There is more room for the optical printer, which previously had been sitting largely unused in an equipment storage room. There was also a need for a second animation suite in order to develop animation training opportunities. Also, with more members working on their productions it was necessary to expand and update the editing facilities to accommodate their needs. The new space is wheelchair accessible which makes it possible to be enjoyed by members who were previously unable to access the facilities.

== Membership ==
IMAC has two different memberships, general and producer. New member applicants are reviewed at each monthly board meeting.

=== General membership ===
The general membership entitles those to receive newsletters and emails, printed materials, access to members log-in site and to attend functions at members rates. The general membership is a voting membership. The General Membership does not entitle those to rent equipment or use the facilities unless under the guidance of a producing pember. To upgrade to a producer membership you must produce one work under the mentorship of a qualified producer member and submit a new application for board review. Upon acceptance, your anniversary date will remain the same.

The cost to join as a general member is $25CAD.

=== Producer membership ===
All applications are reviewed by the board of directors and if approved you will be entitled to receive our monthly newsletter, emails from the executive director, access to the members log in site and to be able to attend functions at member rate and access to equipment. A producer membership entitles you to one vote at the annual general meeting and the right to sit on committees. To be considered, a person applying for the producer membership must provide at least two video project where they are listed as either a producer or director. Producer members are able to rent out equipment for general members, as long as the producer member is with the equipment at all times.

The cost to join as a producer member is $40CAD.

== Board of directors ==
The board of directors are involved members of the co-op who are open to hearing ideas and suggestions from the wider membership. They are elected annually in June by current members of the cooperative.

As of May 2014, the board of directors are:

- Nils Ling (President)
- Millefiore Clarkes (Vice President)
- Monica Lacey (Secretary)
- Susanne MacDonald (Treasurer)
- Patti Larsen (Member at Large)
- Laura Cieczkowski (Member at Large)
- Mark Sandiford (Member at Large)

== Funding ==
IMAC's funding comes from a variety of sources. Major operational funding comes from the Canada Council of the Arts, which also contributes in the form of workshop and equipment purchase grants.

The National Film Board contributes an annual grant for all production expenses that any member can access through written proposals to the Program Committees. Budget, cast and crew and a copy of the script should be attached to your proposal. The board has final approval. Occasionally the co-op has received funding from other outside resources such as, the PEI Department of Tourism, PEI Council of the Arts, InnovationPEI and the CBC.

Individual members have raised production funds from such sources as the Department of Community and Cultural Affairs and the Linda Joy Busby Media Arts Foundation, as well as private sources.
