= Sherbrooke Symphony Orchestra =

- Orchestra
- Former name: Symphonie Saint-Charles
- Founded: 1935
- Location: Sherbrooke, Quebec, Canada
- Principal conductor: Stéphane Laforest
- Website: ossherbrooke.com

Sherbrooke Symphony Orchestra (OSS) (French: L'Orchestre symphonique de Sherbrooke), is a symphony orchestra based in Sherbrooke, Quebec, Canada, with Université de Sherbrooke as its home.

== History ==
The orchestra's first performance took place on 3 April 1940. Founded by Horace Boux, Sylvio Lacharité and others in 1935 at the Séminaire de Sherbrooke, the orchestra was initially known as the Symphonie Saint-Charles. The first music director was Sylvio Lacharité, who retained that position until 1969.

On 13 February 1945 the orchestra gave its first concert at the Granada Theater. In 1964 it signed a partnership with the Université de Sherbrooke to perform at the Maurice-O'Bready Theatre.

== Prestations ==
The orchestra usually performs in front of an audience of 1,300, of whom about 700 are members. Since mid-2000, it has given some free concerts in Sherbrooke's downtown and around the Eastern Townships. The orchestra's repertoire is not limited to classical music; it also plays some hommage or thematic representations. In 2007 the Beatles were honoured, and every year a Christmas show is held in December.

== Direction ==
- Sylvio Lacharité (1935–1969)
- Claude Paradis (1969–1976)
- Guy Robitaille, Raymond Dessaints and Pierre Rolland (1976–1977)
- Roland Leduc (1977–1980)
- Brian Ellard (1980–1983)
- Jean-François Sénart (1985–1986)
- Marc David (1988–19??)
- Stéphane Laforest (1998–present)

== Awards ==
- (Late 1990) : Best regional orchestra — Conseil des arts et des lettres du Québec.

== See also ==
- Montreal Symphony Orchestra
- Quebec Symphony Orchestra
