= Brian Ellard =

Canadian music conductor

Brian Joseph Ellard, M.A., Ph.D., (January 15, 1940 – July 29, 2021) was a Canadian educator, musicologist, arranger, and conductor.

== Early life and education ==
Born in Ottawa, Ontario in 1940, Brian Ellard studied music at the Eastman School of Music, where he earned three degrees: BMus (1966), MA (1968), and PhD (1973).

== Career ==
From 1970 to 1978, Ellard was the chairman of the Music Department at the University of Moncton, following which he held a one-year appointment as the Dean of the Faculty of Arts.

In 1979 Ellard was chosen to head the Music Department at the Université de Sherbrooke. In 1981 he founded Le Chœur symphonique de Sherbrooke, and became the conductor of the Sherbrooke Symphony Orchestra. His time at Sherbrooke was short; the music program was never properly funded, and in 1982 Ellard gave up his efforts to organize the program and resigned.

From 1983 to 1988, Ellard headed the Music Department at Mount Allison University. During this time he was also the conductor of the Prince Edward Island Symphony Orchestra, a post he held until 1997. He retired from Mount Allison in 2003.

== Death ==
Brian Joseph Ellard died on July 29, 2021, in Moncton, New Brunswick.
