= Saddle River Stringband (album) =

Studio album by Saddle River Stringband
- Released: November 27, 2007
- Genre: Bluegrass, blues
- Label: Sunzahorse, Panda Digital
- Producer: Saddle River Stringband

Professional ratings
Review scores
Source	Rating
AllMusic	3/5 stars

Saddle River Stringband is the debut album from the band of the same name. The album was a winner at the 2008 East Coast Music Awards in the bluegrass music category.

== Track listing ==
1. Outlaw Blues*
2. Louis Collins (M.J. Hurt)
3. Nashville Junky**
4. Swagger and Sway*
5. We Shall Rise (A.P. Carter)
6. Don't Sell it (O. Woods)
7. County Farm (S. House)
8. Grenadine*
9. I Don't Think you Love Me***
10. So Long Blues**
11. Some of These Days (C. Patton)
12. Bye Bye PEI***
- *J. Phillips
- **T. McArthur
- ***M. Dixon

== Personnel ==
- Mike Dixon - guitar, kazoo
- James Phillips - mandolin
- Troy McArthur - banjo, ukulele
- Tom Desroches - double bass
- Norm Bowser - dobro (on track 9)
- Produced by Saddle River Stringband
- Engineered by Troy McArthur and James Phillips
- Mixed by Troy McArthur and James Phillips
- Mastered by Paul Milner
- Photography and graphic design by Jillian Grady
