= John Gracie =

Canadian musician

- Origin: Glace Bay, Nova Scotia, Canada
- Genres: Folk, country
- Occupation: Singer
- Years active: 1984–present
- Website: johngracie.ca

John Gracie is a Canadian folk music artist. Born in Glace Bay, Nova Scotia, Gracie is a three-time East Coast Music Awards Male Artist of the Year, winning in 1989, 1990 and 2000. He has also received nominations from the Juno Awards and the RPM Music Awards, among others. His song "Pass It On" was selected as a theme song for food banks across Canada.

== Discography ==
=== Albums ===
Year	Title	CAN Country
1988	Thinkin' 'Bout Midnight	
1992	Standing in the Dark	
1995	A Gene MacLellan Tribute	36
1996	Have Yourself a Merry Little Christmas	
1997	Nova Scotia Lullabye	
1999	Identity	
2000	Live! Off the Floor but Close to the Ground	
2003	Christmas as I Remember It	
2004	Acoustic JEEP	
2006	Simply Christmas	
2008	Then Again – Recollections	
2014	Big Bright Yellow Sun	
2017	Hollow Street	
2019	Christmas Time Is Here	

=== Singles ===
Year	Title	CAN Country	Album
1984	"Sail On Nova Scotia"	-	non album singles
1985	"Welcome to the Ceilidh" (with Jennifer Whalen)	-	non album singles
1986	"Seabirds Cry"	-	non album singles
1988	"I’ve Got A Dream"	-	non album singles
1988	"Take A Piece Of My Day"	-	non album singles
1990	"Take My Love"	-	non album singles
1994	"My Baby's Got Roy Rogers' Eyes"	62	Standing in the Dark
1998	"Highwire in a Hurricane"	44	Identity
1999	"She's All I Got"	36	Identity
1999	"If You Burn That Bridge"	46	Identity
2000	"What's This Love Coming To"	—	Identity
