= Jaelem Bhate =

Canadian conductor and bandleader

- Born: August 20, 1993 (age 32); Vancouver, British Columbia
- Genres: Jazz, Classical
- Occupations: Musician, conductor, educator
- Instrument: Drums
- Website: https://jaelembhate.ca/

Jaelem Bhate is a Canadian conductor, composer, and bandleader from Vancouver, British Columbia. He received his Master of Music degree in Orchestral Conducting at the University of British Columbia in 2019 under the guidance of Dr. Jonathan Girard. He previously received his undergraduate degree in percussion performance at UBC where he graduated first in his class and received the prestigious Wesbrook Award for academic achievement and leadership. He has also studied with Cristian Măcelaru, Yannick Nézet-Séguin, Marin Alsop, Boris Brott, Gerard Schwarz, and Fred Stride.

Bhate has performed with the Vancouver Symphony Orchestra, Vancouver Metropolitan Orchestra, Kamloops Symphony, Nanaimo Symphony, and the Vancouver Island Symphony. He is the current director of the Vancouver Brass Collective, the Jaelem Bhate Jazz Orchestra, as well as the artistic director of Symphony 21, an ensemble which he founded. In 2024, Bhate was announced as the new Music Director for the Prince Edward Island Symphony Orchestra. Prior to his position at the PEISO, Bhate was a faculty member at the University of British Columbia.

Bhate was named to the CBC's 2019 '30 under 30 hot classical musicians. He has released two albums with the Jaelem Bhate Jazz Orchestra; On the Edge, and Carmen, a reimagining of Bizet’s operatic masterpiece for jazz ensemble. On the Edge won the 2020 Julian Award for emerging Canadian jazz excellence.

In 2025, Bhate was awarded the Jean-Marie Beaudet Award in Orchestra Conducting by the Canada Council.

== Early life and education ==
Bhate was raised in Richmond, British Columbia. He attended Hugh Boyd Secondary School where he began drumming in rock and jazz ensembles, considering music only as a hobby, going on to pursue a degree in sciences at the University of British Columbia. Bhate later began pursuing music academically when he was asked to chaperone for his former secondary school band and was elected to conduct when their instructor was absent. Bhate then transferred in his second year to pursue an undergraduate degree in Music, followed by a Masters of Music in Orchestral Conducting.

== Discography ==
- Jaelem Bhate Jazz Orchestra. On the Edge, 2020.
- Jaelem Bhate Jazz Orchestra. Bizet's Carmen, 2021.
