= Charlie A'Court =

Canadian musician (born 1978)

- Born: 1978 (age 47–48); Truro, Nova Scotia
- Genres: Blues, folk, soul
- Occupations: Singer, songwriter, guitarist, producer
- Instruments: Vocals, guitar
- Years active: 2000-present
- Website: www.charlieacourt.com

Charlie A'Court is a Canadian musician, songwriter and producer. He has toured extensively throughout Canada, Australia and Germany.

As a six-time East Coast Music Award winner and eight-time Nova Scotia Music Award winner, A'Court has earned awards for Blues, Pop, and R&B/Soul Recordings of the Year, and on multiple occasions been recognized as Entertainer of the Year. A'Court has also received multiple Maple Blues Award nominations including Male Vocalist and Songwriter of the Year.

== Biography ==
Off stage, A'Court makes giving back to his community a priority. In 2017, A'Court launched the Charlie A'Court Scholarship for Excellence in Music, a $500 bursary awarded to a Nova Scotia high school graduate who is continuing his/her music education in university or college.

== Discography ==
=== Albums ===
List of albums, with selected details
Title	Details
Alone	Released: 2001; Format: CD (EP)
Color Me Gone	Released: 2002; Format: CD
Live	Released: 2003; Format: CD (German release)
Bring On The Storm	Released: 2006; Format: CD
Live At The Marigold	Released: 2009; Format: CD
Triumph And Disaster	Released: 2012; Format: CD
Sun Is Gonna Shine	Released: 2013; Format: CD (Australian release)
Come On Over	Released: 2016; Format: CD, Digital
When Country Gets The Blues	Released: 2021; Format: CD, digital; With Witchitaw
A’Court, Spiegel and Vinnick	Released: 2021; Format: CD, digital; With Suzie Vinnick and Lloyd Spiegel
San Palarino	Released: 2024; Format: CD, digital

=== Singles ===
List of albums, with selected details
Title	Details
See You For Christmas	Released: 2015
Refuse To Fear	Released: 2016
Let Me Win	Released: 2018
