= Prince Edward Island Council of the Arts =

The Prince Edward Island Council of the Arts (PEICA), established in 1974, provides vital support to the arts on Prince Edward Island and acts as the province's arts funding agency comparable to like organizations in other Canadian Provinces. PEICA works to foster the development of the arts through advocacy, education, programs and services. The Lieutenant-Governor of Prince Edward Island is the Patron for PEICA.

PEICA is governed by a volunteer board of directors who are elected from members in good standing at the annual general meeting. Additional expertise is brought to the board through members-at-large from the arts and business communities, an executive director and support staff. PEICA Governance and By-Law documents set out the rules under which the board and the staff operate.

PEICA enjoys an arms-length relationship with the Department of Tourism and Culture of the Government of Prince Edward Island, which contributes the majority of PEICA's funding. These funds are administered by PEICA on the Department's behalf, and are allocated to grant programs and services for artists and arts administrators.

The purpose of PEICA grant funding is to promote and support the creation and presentation of works of art, and to develop the capacity of artists and arts organizations throughout the Province. Grant proposals are adjudicated through process of peer assessment.

The Council works in partnership with the arts community of Prince Edward Island, the Council's membership, the government and people of Prince Edward Island, to fulfill its mission to make the Arts integral to the lives of all Prince Edward Islanders.

PEI Arts offers grants up to maximum:

- Established Professional Artists: $8,000
- Emerging Professional Artists: $5,000

== PEI 5 Strategic Priorities ==
1. Creative Communities
2. Professional Artists
3. Lifelong Learning - in and through the arts
4. Arts Organizations
5. Cohesive Provincial Strategy

PEI approved 33% of applications between 2005-2010.

Average funding request: $3154.00 (2005-2010)
