= The Danks =

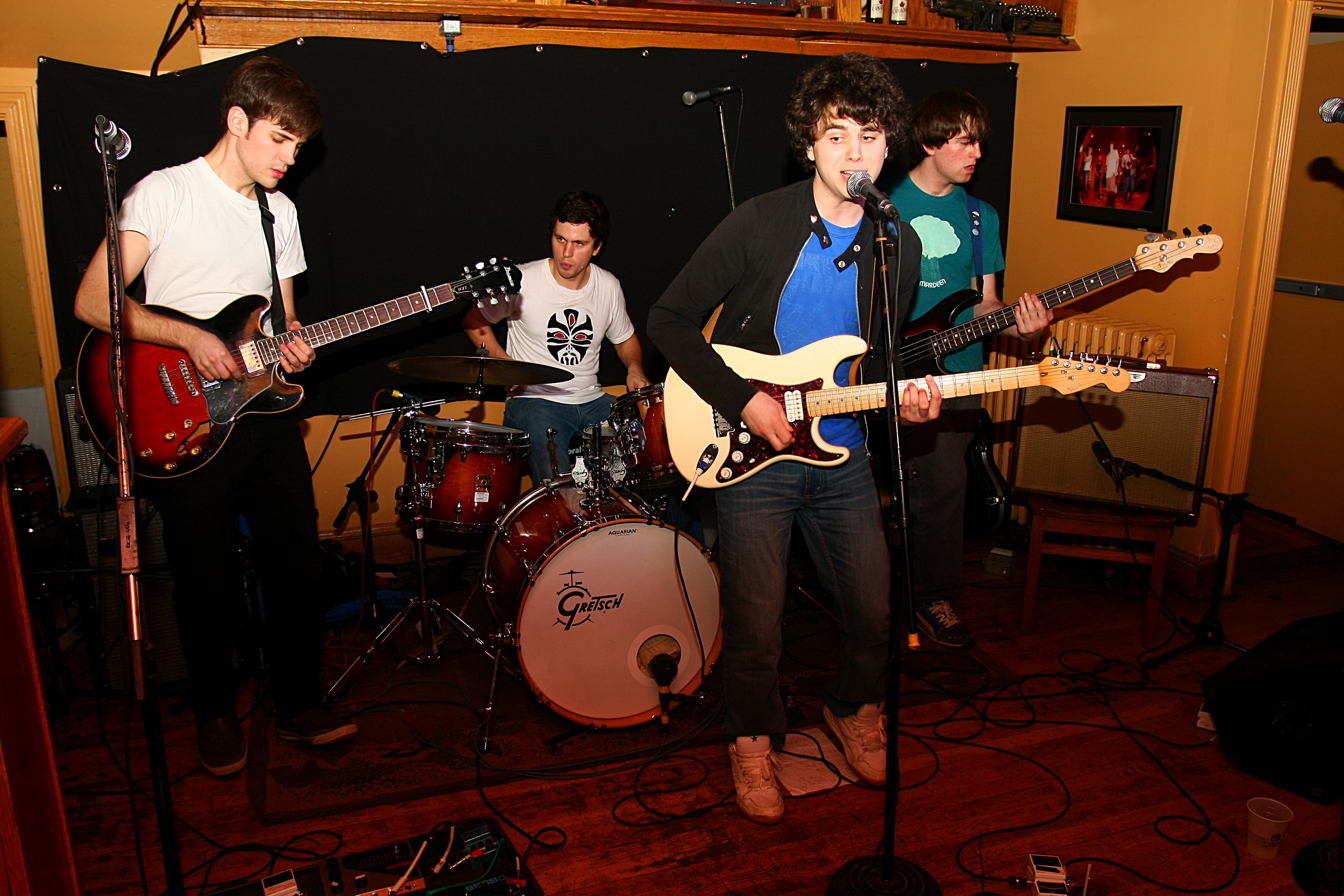

Background information
- Origin: Charlottetown, Prince Edward Island, Canada
- Genre: Indie rock
- Years active: 2005–present
- Label: Collagen Rock Records
- Members: Brohan Moore; Alec O'Hanley; Phil MacIsaac; Brian Murphy
- Past members: Chris Doiron; Andrew MacDonald
- Website: thedanks.com

The Danks are a Canadian indie rock band from Charlottetown, Prince Edward Island, founded by Brohan Moore and Alec O'Hanley. The current lineup includes lead vocalist Brohan Moore, O'Hanley on guitar and keyboards, Brian Murphy on bass, and drummer Phil MacIsaac. Chris Doiron originally played bass guitar, but was replaced by Andrew MacDonald.

The band released the EP Samples on Collagen Rock Records in 2008. Music critic John Sakamoto of the Toronto Star described their sound as "a compelling tug of war between wanting to dance and feeling that there's something else you're supposed to be doing."

Their full-length debut, Are You Afraid of the Danks? was released on June 30, 2009. Giving the album its highest rating, Chart described it as "non-stop, hook-laden revelry from start to finish." Fast Forward Weekly, in its review, wrote, "The Danks are straight-up power pop at heart and there’s simply no denying their power."

Their second LP GANK came out in June 2013, which Exclaim gave 9/10. The band has shared North American stages and basements with Ted Leo and Tokyo Police Club.

== See also ==
- Music of Canada
- Canadian rock
- List of Canadian musicians
- List of bands from Canada
- Category:Canadian musical groups
