= Dominique Dupuis =

Canadian violinist

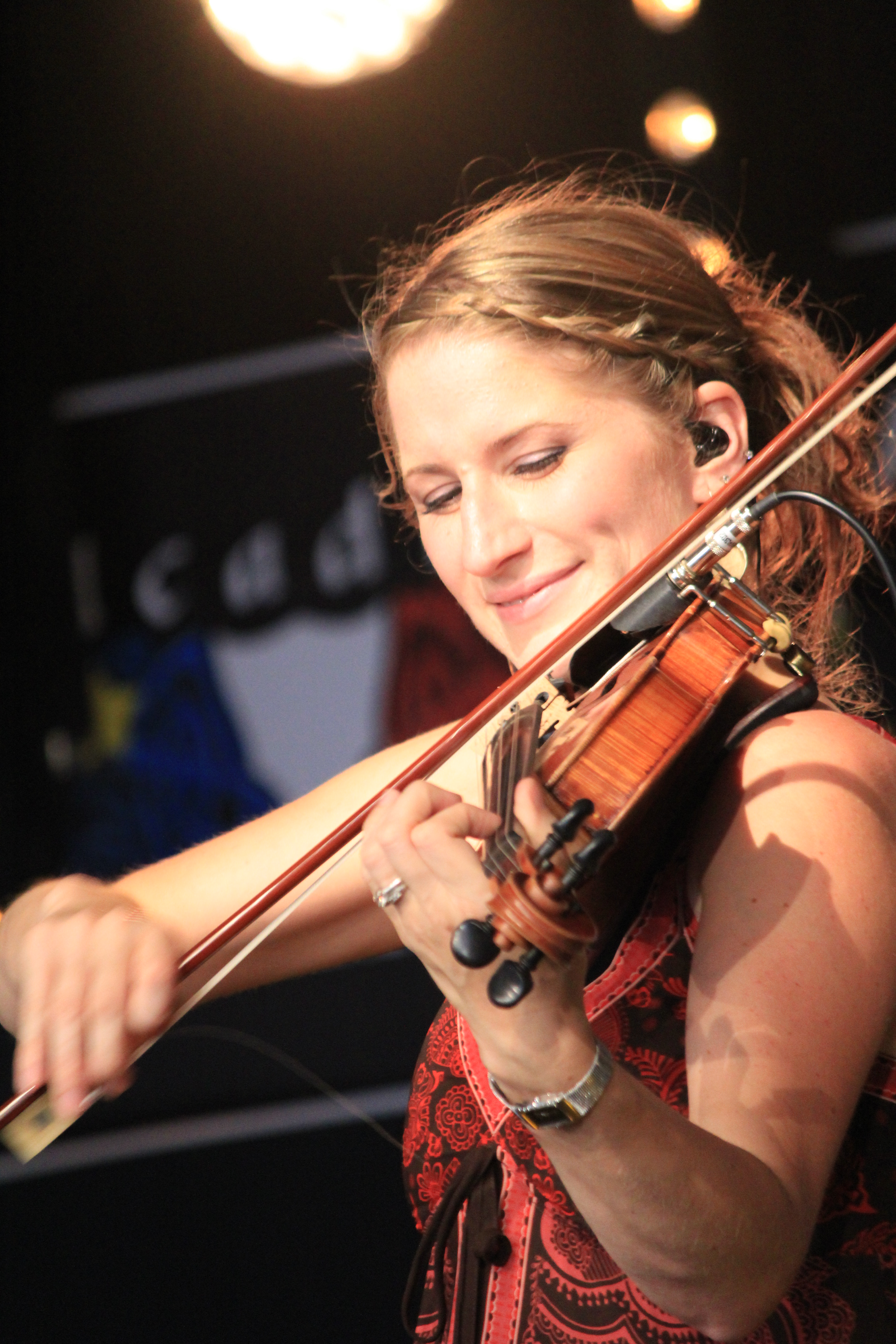
- Dominique Dupuis in 2012 during the Festival interceltique de Lorient

Background information
- Born: 1987 (age 37–38); Memramcook, New Brunswick, Canada
- Origin: Memramcook, New Brunswick, Canada
- Genres: celtic, classical
- Occupation: Violinist
- Instrument: Violin
- Years active: 2002–present
- Labels: Distribution Plages
- Website: www.dominiquedupuis.com

Dominique Dupuis (born 1987), is a Canadian celtic music violinist.

Born in Memramcook, New Brunswick, Canada, she has played violin from the age of nine, when she performed on stage at the Pays de la Sagouine, in Bouctouche. At 12, she performed during the opening ceremonies of the Festival International de Louisiane, in Lafayette. In 2000, she released her first album, Le Bonheur des coups d’Archet, followed in 2002 by Sans Relâche.

Dominique Dupuis studied classic and traditional music. She performed first in Europe in 2002 during Festival de la Cité, in Lausanne, as well as at the Expo '02, in Yverdon-des-Bains. From 2004 she has performed many times at Festival interceltique de Lorient, in Brittany. She was hailed by the French media as the young ambassador of charm of l’Acadie in 2004. Since 2004 she has played in many countries including Italy, France, U.S.A. and many others.

She was the finalist in the Instrumental Artist of the Year category at the 2003 East Coast Music Awards . She participated at Canadian Grand Masters fiddling Championships.

== Music ==
She plays Acadian, Celtic and contemporary music. Dupuis has played with Clearwater (Garth Brooks Tribute Tour), Harmonie and Image.

=== Albums ===
- Le Bonheur des Coups d’Archet (2000)
- Sans Relâche (2002)
- Bourrasque – brilliant mixture of Acadian, Celtic, and contemporary folk tunes.

=== Notable performances ===
- 2 July 2004 – festival Celtica, Valle d'Osta, Italy
- 2010 – Acadian Days, Grand-Pré, Nova Scotia

== External links and sources ==
- Official website
