= Four the Moment =

Canadian a cappella quartet

Four the Moment was a Canadian a cappella quartet from Halifax, Nova Scotia.

The group was formed in 1981 by Delvina Bernard, Kim Bernard, Jackie Barkley and Deanna Sparks to appear at an anti-racism rally in Halifax, where they performed Sweet Honey in the Rock's "Joanne Little". Over the course of their career, they have performed songs written by Delvina Bernard and George Elliott Clarke, largely but not exclusively about Black Nova Scotian themes and experiences, in a style that blended a cappella music with elements of gospel music, blues music and reggae. Delvina and Kim Bernard remained the two constant members of the group throughout its lifetime, with Barkley later replaced by Andrea Currie, and Sparks replaced first by Debby Jones and later by Anne Marie Woods.

They released the album We're Still Standing in 1988, and were featured as contributing musicians on Lillian Allen's album Conditions Critical. They performed across Canada at various music and cultural festivals, including Expo 86 and the 1988 Winter Olympics. Although they never released any further albums, they continued to tour on the festival circuit in the 1990s, until undertaking a farewell tour in 2000.

The group experienced a significant resurgence in 2022 when Music Resistance, a short documentary film about them by Erica Meus-Saunders, premiered at the 2022 FIN Atlantic Film Festival. Soon afterward, a tribute to the quartet was announced as part of Nova Scotia Music Week, and We're Still Standing won the jury prize for the Slaight Family Polaris Heritage Prize at the 2022 Polaris Music Prize ceremony.
