= Les Méchants Maquereaux =

Les Méchants Maquereaux (translated:The Naughty/Evil Mackerels or Pimps, a pun in French) are an Acadian musical group originating from New Brunswick. The band formed in 1992 with locals Johnny Comeau, Roland Gauvin, and Cayouche with Louisiana's Zachary Richard. In 1995, they won the East Coast Music Award for Acadian Recording Artist of the Year.
