= Nova Scotia Mass Choir =

Canadian choral ensemble

The Nova Scotia Mass Choir is a Canadian choral ensemble based in Halifax, Nova Scotia. The choir performs mainly black gospel music, and focuses on spreading the message of racial harmony.

== History ==
The Nova Scotia Mass Choir was founded in 1992. In 1993, they performed in Washington, D.C., at a concert in memory of Martin Luther King Jr.

In 1995, the choir performed with Oliver Jones in Halifax. That year they released an album on the Jongleur label.

By 1998 the choir had 63 members.

The Nova Scotia Mass Choir has performed locally, nationally and internationally, and has won two East Coast Music Awards. The choir reaches audiences that would not normally be exposed to the genre of black gospel music, and showcases the cultural contributions of African Nova Scotians.

The choir's repertoire features compositions by well-known local composers and musical directors as well as choir members themselves. The group also performs arrangements of traditional gospel and folk music.

Several times a year, the Mass Choir gives benefit concerts in support of racial harmony and to assist various charitable causes, and performs an annual concert to commemorate Martin Luther King Jr.
