= Louise Manny =

Canadian folklorist and historian (1890–1970)

Louise Elizabeth Manny (21 February 1890 – 17 August 1970) was a Canadian folklorist and historian from New Brunswick. She was born in Gilead, Maine, the daughter of Charles de Grass Manny, a spoolmaker, and Minette Lee Harding, and her family moved to New Brunswick when she was three. She grew up on the Miramichi River and there she developed an interest in the local history, of which she wrote and broadcast extensively.

She was educated in Newcastle, and then the Halifax Ladies College and the Ursuline Convent in Quebec City. She graduated from McGill University in Montreal in 1913 with a Bachelor of Arts degree with honors in French and English. After graduation she taught briefly at the Halifax Ladies College before returning to Newcastle.

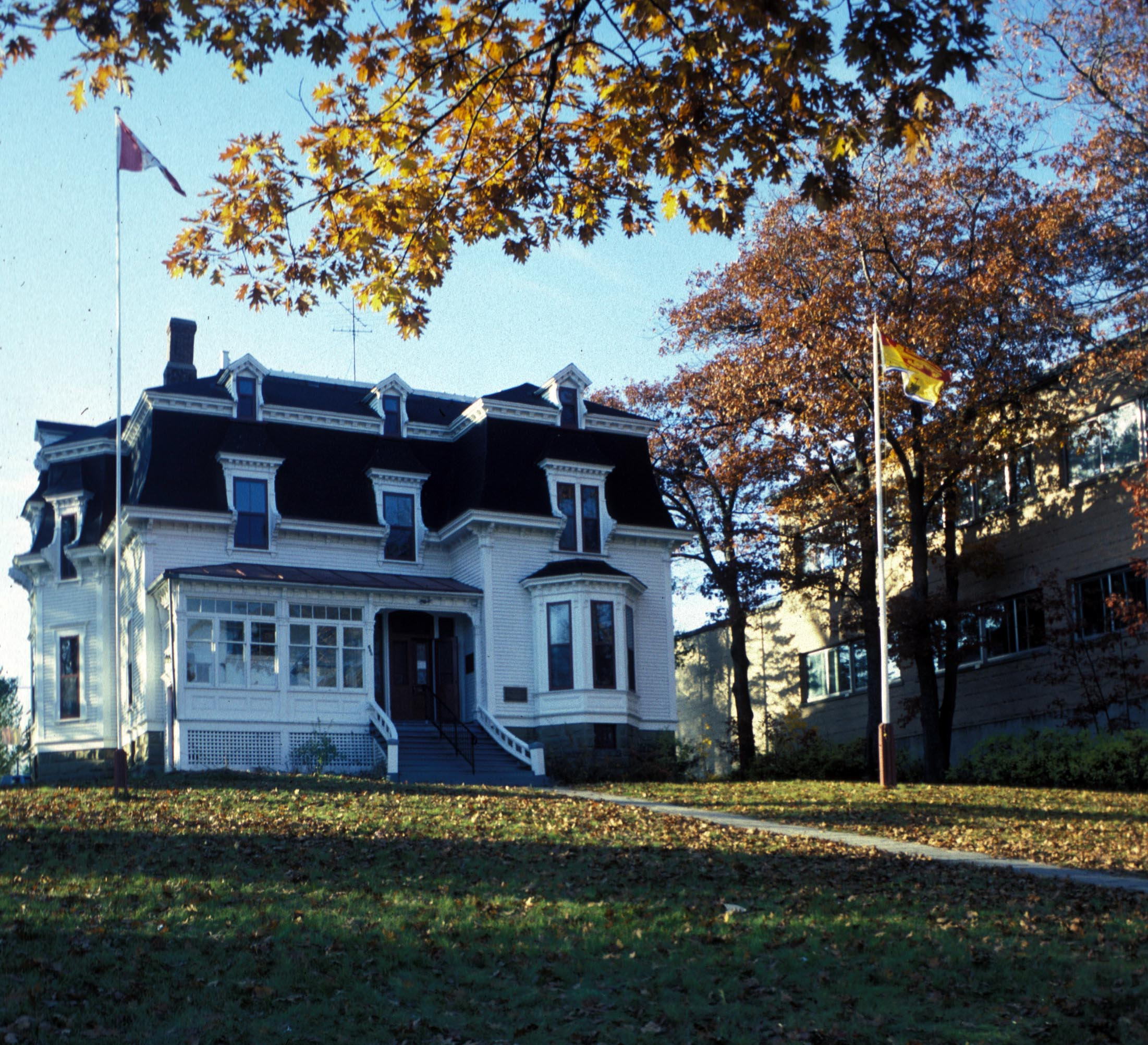
Beaverbrook House, formerly the Old Manse Library (where Louise Manny worked), and earlier the boyhood home of Max Aitken, Lord Beaverbrook, in Newcastle, Miramichi, New Brunswick (IR Walker 1983)

In 1947, she was commissioned by Max Aitken Lord Beaverbrook, a wealthy British politician and newspaperman who was born in New Brunswick, and began to collect and record the songs of lumbermen and fishermen in the Miramichi region. Beaverbrook also provided financial assistance to allow her to restore The Manse in Newcastle, New Brunswick which became the local library.

Beaverbrook placed stringent constraints on her folklore collections. He stipulated that she collect only New Brunswick folksongs, not those passed down from other sources. After she completed her assignment for Beaverbrook (published as Songs of Miramichi), she continued her research with more freedom, establishing a more encompassing philosophy: to her, folksong were songs "people sing from memory for their own and their friends' amusement, and are composed by the people themselves and passed on by word of mouth." Thus, whether old or new, they "show the basic cultural background of our country, something which is truly our own and which has sprung from the people. In recording them in all their simplicity we have preserved something of New Brunswick life and culture which has a value and beauty all its own."

She compiled three collections of recorded songs: Beaverbrook Collection, Dr. Manny Collection, and North Shore Collection. From 1947 to 1968, she presented these recordings in weekly broadcasts on CKMR radio in Newcastle.

Manny also presented items of historical interest in a weekly newspaper column called "Scenes from an Earlier Day". She founded the Miramichi Folksong Festival in 1957 and was the festival director from 1958 to 1969. The festival, which still continues, provided additional material for her work. In her work she was closely associated with Helen Creighton and Edward D. Ives who worked respectively in neighbouring Nova Scotia and Maine.

She also completed a series of three volumes chronicling New Brunswick's shipbuilding history.

In 1961, she was awarded two honorary degrees, one from St. Thomas College in Chatham and the other from the University of New Brunswick.

In 1966, she was honored by the American Association for State and Local History for her work as a historian and folklorist. In 1967, she was awarded a Woman of the Century medal from the National Council of Jewish Women of Canada. In 1969, her name was given to a mountain, Mount Manny, in New Brunswick's Historians' Range.

== Publications and recordings ==
- 'Folksongs of the Miramichi: Lumber and River Songs from the Miramichi Folk Fest, Newcastle, New Brunswick' (1962 Folkways album).
- Songs of Miramichi (Fredericton 1968) with James Reginald Wilson
- Ships of Miramichi: A history of shipbuilding on the Miramichi River, New Brunswick, Canada, 1773-1919

== Honours ==
- Woman of the Century medal from the National Council of Jewish Women of Canada (1967)
- Mount Manny in New Brunswick's Historians' Range was named for her (1969)
- Honorary LL D (St Thomas College, Chatham) (1961)
- Honorary LL D (University of New Brunswick) (1961)
