= Symphony New Brunswick =

Symphony New Brunswick is the largest classical music organization in the province of New Brunswick. It is based in Saint John, New Brunswick, Canada. The orchestra was founded in 1983 following the demise of the Halifax-based Atlantic Symphony Orchestra ("ASO") which performed in several New Brunswick cities from 1969 to 1982. The ASO followed two predecessor orchestras based in New Brunswick. From 1950 to 1962, the Saint John Symphony Orchestra, founded by Evelyn Collins, Bruce Holder Sr. and Kelsey Jones, played in Saint John and from 1953-1962, the Fredericton Civic Orchestra served the Province's capital city. The two New Brunswick orchestras merged in 1962 to form the New Brunswick Symphony Orchestra which was itself replaced in 1969 by the ASO. The NBSO's Principal Conductor was Janis Kalnins of Fredericton.

Symphony New Brunswick presents concerts in Saint John at the Imperial Theatre, in Moncton at the Capitol Theatre, and in Fredericton at several venues including the Playhouse.

The Symphony sponsors two chamber groups, the Saint John String Quartet and a woodwind quintet, Ventus Machina, founded in 2013 which is based in Dieppe, New Brunswick. The Saint John String Quartet has been performing since 1987 and has been an East Coast Music Award winner and has been nominated for a Juno award. The members of the Quartet and two members of Ventus Machina are principals in the orchestra. Both the Quartet and the Quintet perform in the Symphony's chamber music series and, under the Symphony's auspices, perform numerous school concerts in many parts of New Brunswick. In May 2013, the organization launched a new chamber orchestra named Camerata New Brunswick, with the goal of reaching smaller New Brunswick communities throughout New Brunswick. Camerata has performed in Saint Andrews, Rothesay, Dieppe, Woodstock, Florenceville-Bristol, Shediac, Bouctouche, Miramichi and Sackville.

Symphony New Brunswick announced in May 2013 a new long-term partnership with the Moncton-based choral group, the Louisbourg Choir which is under the direction of Monique Richard at the Université de Moncton.

The Symphony's concerts between March and May of 2020 were cancelled due to the Covid-19 pandemic; however, concerts were resumed by Camerata New Brunswick before live audiences in October, 2020 and continued throughout the remainder of the season. Covid-related public safety protocols were strictly followed at all venues.

On October 23, 2018, the Symphony announced a search for a new Music Director and, on July 1, 2021, Mélanie Léonard of Montreal was named Music Director. Ms. Léonard's initial contract was for three years and her first concerts in her new position occurred in October, 2021. In September, 2023, the Symphony announced an extension of Dr. Leonard's contract to the end of the 2027-2028 season.

Music Directors of Symphony New Brunswick have included: Nurhan Arman 1987-2002; Stéphane Laforest 2005-2009; Michael Newnham 2009-2018; Mélanie Léonard 2021-present

In addition to the Symphony's many government and private sector supporters, it is financed in part by its own endowment fund hosted by an independent charity, Symphony New Brunswick Foundation Inc. based in Saint John, New Brunswick.
