= The Barra MacNeils =

Canadian musical group

- Origin: Sydney Mines, Nova Scotia, Canada
- Genre: Celtic music folk rock
- Years active: 1980–present
- Label: PolyGram
- Members: Sheumas MacNeil, Kyle MacNeil, Stewart MacNeil, Lucy MacNeil, Ryan MacNeil, Boyd MacNeil
- Website: barramacneils.com

The Barra MacNeils are a Canadian musical family group from Sydney Mines, Nova Scotia. The founding members of the group are siblings Sheumas, Kyle, Stewart, and Lucy MacNeil. In 2005, two additional brothers, Ryan and Boyd, joined the band. The Scottish island of Barra is the ancestral home of Clan MacNeil.

== Musical career ==
The MacNeil siblings are from Cape Breton Island and began performing together in 1980 while still teenagers (Lucy MacNeil being only 10 years old). Consequently, they were only able to perform on weekends, and toured during school holidays. The siblings are classically trained musicians and alumni of Mount Allison University (Sheumas 1984, Kyle 1985, Stewart 1987, and Lucy 1991).

In 1986, they released their first eponymous album on their own independent label. The Barra MacNeils won their first East Coast Music Award in 1991, and have won four more since, including a Juno Award for Album of the Year for TimeFrame in 1992, and a Group of the Year award in 2001. They signed with PolyGram, and their first two albums were re-released while their 1993 album Closer To Paradise earned a gold record. They have been an opening act for Céline Dion and have toured regularly across North America and Europe.

== Discography ==
=== Albums ===
Year	Album	Chart Positions		CRIA
Year	Album	CAN	CAN Country	CRIA
1986	The Barra MacNeils			
1989	Rock in the Stream			
1990	Timeframe			
1993	Closer to Paradise	33	10	Gold
1994	The Traditional Album			
1995	The Question	61		
1997	Until Now			
1999	The Christmas Album			
2000	Racket in the Attic			
2005	All at Once			
2006	The Christmas Album II			
2007	The 20th Anniversary Collection			
2009	In Concert (live)			
2009	In Session (live)			
2012	The Celtic Colours Sessions			
2012	The Barra MacNeils with Symphony Nova Scotia (live)			
2018	On The Bright Side			

=== Singles ===
Year	Title	Chart Positions			Album
Year	Title	CAN AC	CAN	CAN Country	Album
1990	"My Heart's in the Highlands"				Timeframe
1993	"Row Row Row"	36	41	81	Timeframe
1993	"Darling Be Home Soon"	29	23		Closer to Paradise
1994	"In the Wink of an Eye"	12	25	31	Closer to Paradise
1994	"Caledonia"	22			Closer to Paradise
1995	"We Celebrate"	16	46		Closer to Paradise
1995	"Myopic"	24		56	The Question
1996	"The Ballad of Lucy Jordan"	50			The Question
1997	"Mouth Music"				Until Now
2000	"Misty Moisty Morning"				Racket in the Attic
2001	"By Northern Light"				Racket in the Attic
