= Miramichi Folksong Festival =

Oldest folk music festival in Canada

Coordinates: 47.0011°N 65.5643°W

- Genre: Roots, folk
- Dates: August
- Locations: Miramichi, New Brunswick; Canada
- Years active: 1958 – present
- Founders: Louise Manny
- Website: http://www.miramichifolksongfestival.com

The Miramichi Folksong Festival is the oldest folk music festival in Canada. It is held annually in Miramichi, New Brunswick, Canada. It was established by folklorist and historian Louise Manny in response to a request from British politician and newspaperman Lord Beaverbrook that she document the traditional songs of his boyhood home. It is the longest continuous event of its kind in Canada and one of the longest in North America. The first festival was held in September 1958 at the Beaverbrook Town Hall and Theatre in Newcastle, New Brunswick. The festival is still held at this location, now in August of each year.

Although the festival now is an important draw for local tourism, and features some mainstream talent, the original and primary purpose of the festival is to preserve local culture; thus, highlights of the festival include many amateur, often elderly, local performers.

Traditional lyrics and music highlighted by the festival were preserved in the 1968 book Songs of Miramichi and in several recordings, including a 1962 Folkways Records album produced by Louise Manny.

Allan Kelly (23 September 1903 - 1 October 2008) was one of the most popular singers and ardent supporters of the Festival. One of his earliest performances, The Petit Moine, is recorded on the 1962 album.

Raymond and Frank Estey, brothers from Sevogle, New Brunswick, sang each year. Afterward, the Esteys entertained the crowd by telling their famous ghost stories.
