= Barachois (band) =

Acadian traditional music group

- Origin: Prince Edward Island, Canada
- Genres: Acadian
- Years active: 1995–2003
- Past members: Hélène Bergeron; Albert Arsenault; Louise Arsenault; Chuck Arsenault

Barachois was an Acadian traditional music group from the Evangeline Region of Prince Edward Island. The band's high-energy stage show highlighted local fiddling, stepdancing and song traditions.

== History ==
The group was formed in the mid-1990s by siblings Hélène Bergeron and Albert Arsenault, distant cousin Louise Arsenault, and unrelated Chuck Arsenault. The name of the group refers to a barachois, an Acadian word for a type of shallow lagoon found on the ocean shores of eastern Canada.

The four began performing in 1993 at dinner theatres and house parties. In 1996 they recorded their first album, Barachois, which was nominated in 1997 for three East Coast Music Awards, winning one of them, Francophone Recording of the Year. Over the group's nine-year run, they produced 3 albums and were awarded a number of national and international awards, including five ECMA's, a Juno nomination, and "Chevaliers" de l'Ordre de la Pleades (Officers in the order of French parliaments).

Barachois toured Canada and the US, as well as fifteen other countries.

The band amicably retired in 2003. Chuck and Albert toured as a duo for another seven years, presenting a show which included comedic skits as well as traditional music. Louise and Hélène went on to found and perform with two other traditional French-Acadian bands Les Girls and Gadelle.

== Members ==
The members of the group were:

- Albert Arsenault - fiddle, Acadian percussion, bass, vocals
- Hélène Bergeron - keyboards, guitar, fiddle, vocals
- Louise Arsenault - fiddle, guitar, foot percussion, vocals
- Chuck Arsenault - guitar, brass instruments, harmonica, vocals

== Discography ==
- 1996 Barachois - Acadian Music from Prince Edward Island
- 1999 Encore!
- 2002 Naturel
