= Paper Lions =

Canadian indie rock band

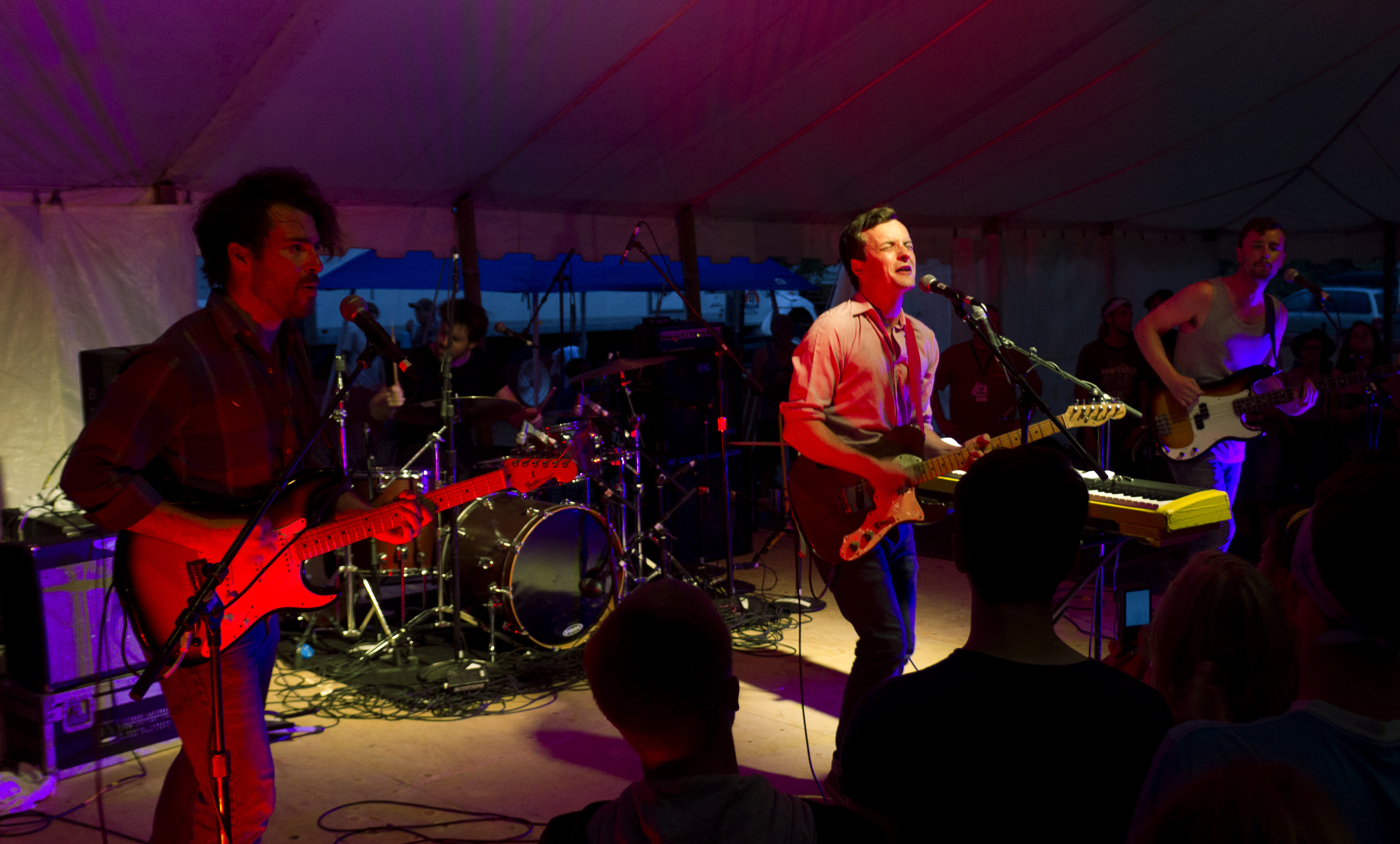
- Paper Lions performing at the 2011 Hillside Festival

Background information
- Also known as: The Chucky Danger Band (2004-2008)
- Origin: Belfast, Prince Edward Island, Canada
- Genres: Indie rock Pop
- Years active: 2004–present
- Labels: Thank You Cathy
- Members: John MacPhee; David Cyrus MacDonald; Colin Buchanan; Rob MacPhee
- Website: paperlions.com

Paper Lions (formerly the Chucky Danger Band) is a Canadian indie rock band, formed and based in Charlottetown, Prince Edward Island. They have toured around Canada, and have released several albums, including 2016's Full Colour.

== History ==
In Belfast, Prince Edward Island, in 2004, by singer and guitarist John MacPhee, drummer David Cyrus MacDonald, guitarist Colin Buchanan and bass guitarist Rob MacPhee formed the band Chuck Danger. The MacPhees are brothers, and Buchanan grew up next door to them. They met MacDonald in high school.

Chucky Danger's debut full-length album, Colour, was released in 2006. The band won the 2006 East Coast Music Award for Pop Recording of the Year for their EP 6-pack.

They received three nominations at the 2007 East Coast Music Awards: Group Recording of the Year, Single of the Year ("Marching Machine"), and Rock Recording of the Year. Their third release, Chucky Danger, was released in August of that year.

They were nominated for four awards at the 2008 East Coast Music Awards.

In February 2008, the band officially changed their name to Paper Lions. They then completed several tours including a 7-show tour with the American band, Cake, and released an album Trophies, which appeared on the !Earshot National Top 50 Chart in October 2010. Their song "Stay Here for a While" made them finalists in the 2010 John Lennon Songwriting Competition.

Paper Lions were featured on CBC Radio, and the video for their single "Lost the War" was nominated for a 2010 CBC Radio 3 Bucky Award.

The band performed on September 29, 2010, on MTV Live and their track "Lost the War" was featured in several episodes of the ABC television show, Greek.

In 2010, Paper Lions were selected to perform at the 2010 World Expo in China, as well as at the 2010 Olympic Winter Games in Vancouver, British Columbia, and at the 2010 Paralympics in Whistler, British Columbia.

Paper Lions signed in September 2010 to the MuseBox label for the official release of their album Trophies; they then headed out on a cross-Canada tour. When they had not received any royalties from record sales by February 2012, the band released Trophies independently via free digital download. Musebox later admitted an error caused by staffing changes and agreed to pay the band.

The band's 2014 album My Friends was named Album of the Year at the Music Prince Edward Island awards. My Friends was produced, engineered, and mixed by Howard Redekopp, who has also produced Tegan and Sara, The New Pornographers, and Mother Mother. The band also won several other local awards that year.

In 2016, they posted an a cappella cover of The Tragically Hip's "Bobcaygeon" to their YouTube channel. In 2016, the band released an album, Full Colour, and were once more nominated for four East Coast Music Awards.

== Discography ==
- Two Brothers, A Major, and a Minor (2003)
- 6-pack EP (2004)
- Colour (2006)
- Chucky Danger (2007)
- Trophies (2010)
- At Long Creek (2012)
- My Friends (2013)
- Full Colour (2016)
- At Long Creek II (2018)
- Stay Together (2019)

== Awards ==
Independent Music Awards 2013: At Long Creek-EP - Best Pop EP
