= Prince Edward Island Music Awards =

The Prince Edward Island Music Awards, also referred to as the Music PEI Awards, are an annual set of awards distributed at the beginning of each year to honour musicians and musical works from the Canadian province of Prince Edward Island, in the region of Atlantic Canada. The awards are administered by Music PEI, a non-profit music advocacy association which promotes the province's local music industry.

To be eligible, nominees must be full-time, continuous residents of Prince Edward Island during the year preceding the annual awards ceremony. Overall musical performance awards are distributed in various categories, including best male and female vocalist, best francophone recording, best songwriter, best music video, and Album of the Year. Several genre-specific awards are also distributed to the best performers in various musical genres such as country, classical, alternative rock, jazz, or pop. The PEI Music Awards also include several non-recording categories which honour technical and visual achievement within the music industry. The awards ceremony is commonly held in the Confederation Centre of the Arts in downtown Charlottetown, the provincial capital.
