= Rita MacNeil discography =

- Studio albums: 20
- Live albums: 1
- Compilation albums: 5
- Singles: 22

Rita MacNeil was a Canadian singer-songwriter from Big Pond, Nova Scotia. Her discography comprises 20 studio albums, five compilation albums, one live album, and 22 singles.

== Albums ==
=== Studio albums ===
Title	Details	Peak positions			Certifications
Title	Details	CAN	CAN Country	AUS	Certifications
Born a Woman	Release year: 1975; Label: Boot	—	—	—	
Part of the Mystery	Release year: 1981; Label: Big Pond	—	—	—	
I'm Not What I Seem	Release year: 1982; Label: World	—	—	—	
Flying On Your Own	Release year: 1986; Label: Virgin	27	—	57	CAN: 2× Platinum
Reason to Believe	Release year: 1988; Label: Virgin	20	—	17	CAN: 2× Platinum; AUS: Platinum
Now the Bells Ring	Release year: 1988; Label: Virgin	—	—	65	CAN: 3× Platinum
Rita	Release year: 1989; Label: Virgin	31	—	118	CAN: 2× Platinum
Home I'll Be	Release year: 1990; Label: Virgin	22	—	40	CAN: 2× Platinum
Thinking of You	Release year: 1992; Label: Virgin	19	19	—	CAN: Platinum
Once Upon a Christmas	Release year: 1993; Label: Virgin	44	—	—	CAN: Platinum
Porch Songs	Release year: 1995; Label: EMI	—	—	—	CAN: Gold
Music of a Thousand Nights	Release year: 1997; Label: EMI	—	—	—	
Mining the Soul (with The Men of the Deeps)	Release year: 2000; Label: Lupins	—	—	—	
Common Dream	Release year: 2002; Label: Lupins	—	—	—	
Late December	Release year: 2003; Label: Luprock	—	—	—	
Blue Roses	Release year: 2004; Label: Luprock	—	—	—	
Songs My Mother Loved	Release year: 2006; Label: Luprock	—	—	—	
Pocket Full of Dreams	Release year: 2008; Label: Luprock	—	—	—	
The Spirit of Christmas (with Frank Mills)	Release year: 2010; Label: EMI	—	—	—	
Saving Grace	Release year: 2012; Label: Big Pond	—	—	—	
"—" denotes releases that did not chart

=== Compilation albums ===
Title	Details	Peak positions		Certifications
Title	Details	CAN	AUS	Certifications
Working Man: The Very Best	Release year: June 1993; Label: Polydor	—	138	
Volume One: Songs from "The Collection"	Release year: 1994; Label: EMI	31	—	CAN: Platinum
Joyful Sounds: A Seasonal Collection	Release year: 1996; Label: EMI	—	—	
Full Circle	Release year: 1998; Label: EMI	—	—	
Traveling On	Release year: 2013; Label: Luprock	—	—	
"—" denotes releases that did not chart

=== Live albums ===
Title	Details
A Night at the Orpheum (with the Vancouver Symphony Orchestra)	Release year: 1999; Label: EMI

== Singles ==
Year	Title	Peak positions					Album
Year	Title	CAN	CAN AC	CAN Country	AUS	UK	Album
1986	"Flying On Your Own"	42	—	—	142	—	Flying On Your Own
1987	"Used to You"	—	18	—	—	—	Flying On Your Own
1987	"Fast Train to Tokyo"	—	14	—	—	—	Flying On Your Own
1988	"Leave Her Memory"	—	—	32	—	—	Flying On Your Own
1988	"Working Man"	—	21	48	56	11	Reason to Believe
1988	"Walk On Through"	42	—	—	—	—	Reason to Believe
1988	"Reason to Believe"	—	—	—	—	—	Reason to Believe
1988	"The Music's Going Around Again"	—	—	—	157	—	Reason to Believe
1989	"I'll Accept the Rose"	—	—	9	—	—	Rita
1989	"We'll Reach the Sky Tonight"	81	3	—	—	—	Rita
1990	"Crazy Love"	—	6	—	—	—	Rita
1990	"When Love Surrounded You and I"	—	—	31	—	—	Rita
1990	"Why Do I Think of You Today"	—	—	17	—	—	Rita
1990	"You Taught Me Well"	64	6	—	—	—	Home I'll Be
1991	"Watch Love Grow Strong"	—	—	9	—	—	Home I'll Be
1991	"Call Me and I'll Be There"	81	14	—	—	—	Home I'll Be
1991	"Leave Her Memory" (re-release)	—	—	—	—	—	Flying On Your Own
1991	"She's Called Nova Scotia"	—	—	—	—	—	Flying On Your Own
1992	"Journey to Australia"	—	—	—	171	—	Home I'll Be
1992	"Bring It On Home to Me"	69	8	44	—	—	Thinking of You
1993	"Shining Strong"	—	5	23	—	—	Thinking of You
1995	"Steal Me Away"	—	—	—	—	—	Porch Songs
1995	"Rolling Thunder"	87	16	—	—	—	Porch Songs
"—" denotes releases that did not chart
