= Hometown Hockey =

Rogers Hometown Hockey is a former package of National Hockey League (NHL) telecasts aired by Sportsnet as part of its national broadcast rights to the league. Debuting on October 12, 2014, as part of Sportsnet's inaugural season of coverage, the games featured a pre-game show and studio segments hosted on-location by Ron MacLean and Tara Slone from various Canadian cities, profiling local players and communities (including at the "grassroots" level). Each tour stop featured a weekend festival with community activities, culminating with the live broadcast. Hometown Hockey was spun off from prior NHL initiatives promoting hockey at the local level, and served as one of Sportsnet's three exclusive national windows (alongside the flagship Scotiabank Wednesday Night Hockey and Hockey Night in Canada), and one of two with a "game of the week" format.

The games were first aired on Sunday nights on Citytv, after which they moved to Sportsnet beginning in the 2015–16 season. The tour was suspended in March 2020 due to the COVID-19 pandemic, and Hometown Hockey was suspended as a whole during the shortened 2020–21 NHL season (with Hometown Hockey segments instead airing during Hockey Night). Hometown Hockey returned with a new Monday-night scheduling for the 2021–22 NHL season, after which it was replaced with Rogers Monday Night Hockey the following season.

== Format ==
The games were co-hosted on-location by Ron MacLean and Tara Slone from various Canadian cities as part of a nationwide tour. The pre-game show and studio segments for the games featured segments profiling local players and teams from each city.

At least one Canadian-based franchise was featured during each game, although it sometimes also aired a game between two American-based teams if necessary. Most Hometown Hockey games were aired in primetime, although it occasionally aired in the afternoon (such as the second half of the Montreal Canadiens' traditional matinee games on the weekend of the Super Bowl; typically no other games were scheduled that evening).

== History ==
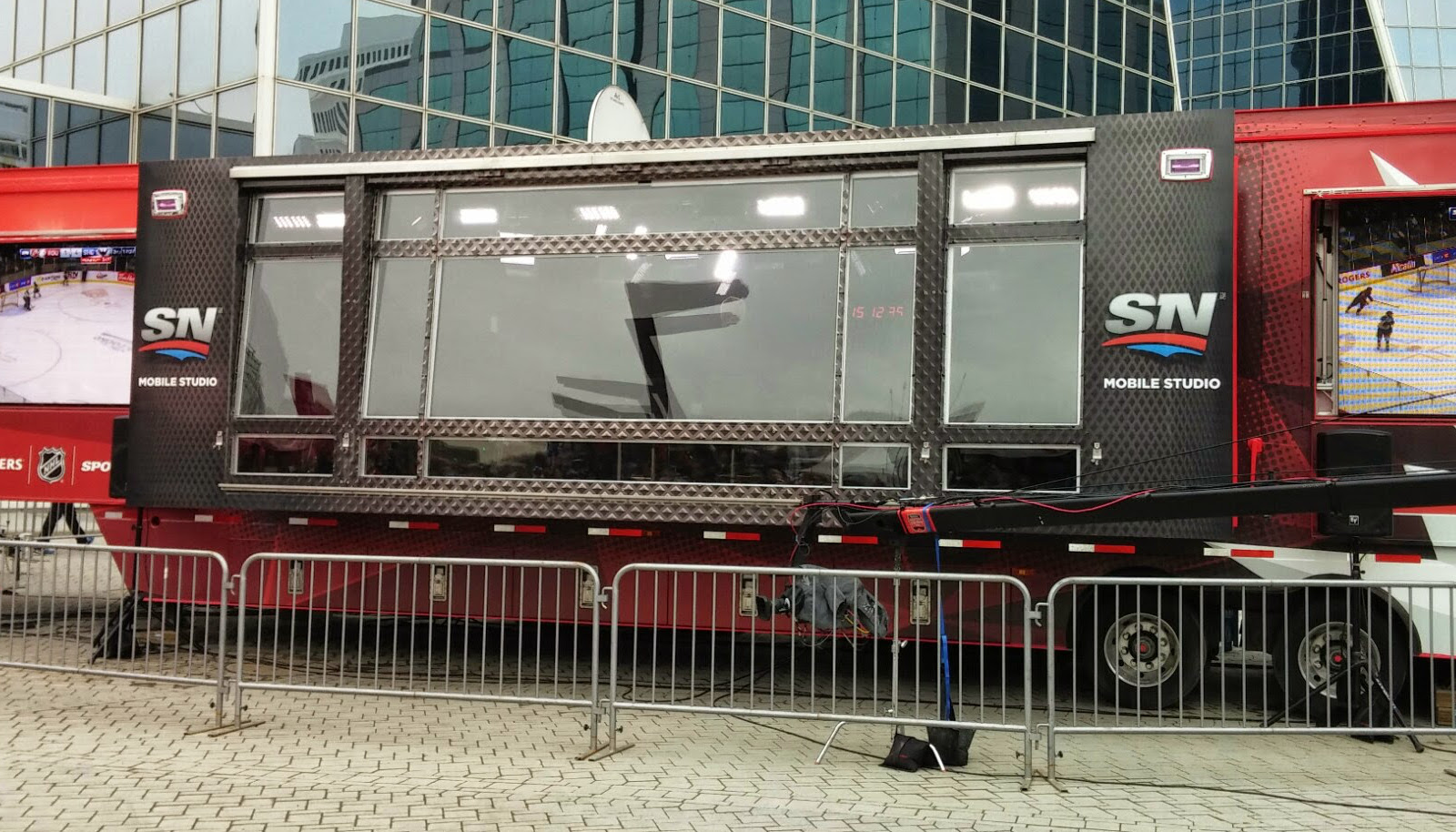
Sportsnet Mobile Studio truck at the Rogers Hometown Hockey Tour in Regina, Saskatchewan.

The games and tour contributed to an effort by Rogers to improve its public image, particularly under CEO Guy Laurence, by associating itself with the sport of hockey at a local level. MacLean characterized Hometown Hockey as an extension of Hockey Day in Canada and the Kraft Hockeyville competition—highlighting grassroots hockey throughout the country on a weekly basis. He also felt that the original Sunday night timeslot was "a good hockey night", believing that it could be "[a] family-forward way of doing the show to get the kids involved. Families can have it on while they get ready for school or work Sunday night. For me, after 27 years, honestly, what’s wrong with doing something different?" The games also sought to emulate the success of ESPN's College GameDay—a traveling pre-game show for ESPN's college football broadcasts, and NBC's Sunday Night Football—which originally aired Sundays against Hometown Hockey during the National Football League season.

The games were carried by Citytv during its inaugural season (with London, Ontario as its inaugural city), although infrequently moved to Sportsnet in the event of scheduling conflicts. Beginning in the 2015–16 season, Hometown Hockey moved exclusively to Sportsnet; Moore explained that introducing Hometown Hockey on Citytv was intended to incubate the brand, but that airing it on Sportsnet had made sense from an economic standpoint due to its status as a pay channel, and enabled Citytv to return to entertainment programming on Sundays.

On March 8, 2020, in recognition of International Women's Day, the Hometown Hockey game that night featured the first all-female broadcast team in NHL history—with play-by-play commentator Leah Hextall, analyst Cassie Campbell-Pascall, and sideline reporter Christine Simpson. Women also served as the executive producer, game producer and director for the telecast.

Due to the COVID-19 pandemic, the Hometown Hockey games and tour were suspended for the 2020–21 NHL season. Two Sunday night Ottawa Senators games (one against the Montreal Canadiens and one against the Toronto Maple Leafs) were produced nationally under the NHL on Sportsnet banner in lieu of regional rightsholder TSN. A branded segment and virtual audience was featured during Hockey Night in Canada.

Beginning with the 2021–22 season, Hometown Hockey broadcasts were moved to Monday nights. Due to the reinstatement of COVID-19 restrictions nationwide due to Omicron variant, the tour was suspended from December 2021 until March 2022.

On June 28, 2022, Rogers cancelled Hometown Hockey after eight seasons; the games were replaced with Rogers Monday Night Hockey the following season. MacLean remains with Sportsnet to host Hockey Night.

== Indigenous representation ==
On March 24, 2019, the Hometown Hockey was broadcast from First Nations territory for the first time, visiting the Enoch Cree Nation outside of Edmonton. Ahead of the game, Rogers announced a partnership with the Aboriginal Peoples Television Network (APTN) to simulcast that night's game with commentary in Plains Cree. It was the first-ever NHL broadcast in the language: Clarence Iron of Pinehouse, Saskatchewan's CFNK-FM (who is known locally for his radio broadcasts of indigenous teams in the language) served as the play-by-play announcer, while former NHL player John Chabot and Northern Cree member Earl Wood hosted the studio segments.

In December 2019, it was announced that Sportsnet and APTN would continue the broadcasts, with six Sunday-night games planned per-season over the next three years. The expanded package began with a Montreal Canadiens/Florida Panthers game in February 2020. On March 1, 2020, the tour broadcast from the Peguis First Nation in Manitoba.

== Awards ==
In 2017 and 2018, Ron MacLean was nominated for Best Sports Host at the 5th Canadian Screen Awards and the 6th Canadian Screen Awards respectively.

In 2020, the Hometown Hockey broadcast from Enoch Cree Nation was nominated in the Best Sports Program or Segment category at the 8th Canadian Screen Awards.

== Season 1 overview ==
In season 1, the tour kicked off in London, Ontario, home of the London Knights. Live tour musical performances included appearances by:

- Blue Rodeo (Saskatoon)
- Sarah Harmer (Kingston)
- Paul Brandt (Lethbridge)

== Season 2 overview ==
In season 2, the tour started in Kitchener, Ontario, home of the Kitchener Rangers. Live tour musical performances included appearances by:

- Barenaked Ladies (Kitchener)
- Rankin Family (Sydney)
- The Tenors (Sarnia)
- Tim Hicks (Oshawa)
- Coleman Hell (Thunder Bay)
- Scott Helman (Penticton)
- Jess Moskaluke (Prince Albert)
- Gord Bamford (Calgary)

== Season 3 overview ==
In season 3, the tour began in Newmarket, Ontario, home of Connor McDavid. Live tour musical performances included appearances by:

- Walk Off the Earth (Newmarket)
- Sam Roberts (Montreal)
- Suzie McNeil (Milton)
- Jason Blaine (Petawawa)
- Paul Brandt (Cochrane)
- USS (Edmonton)
- Kathleen Edwards (Ottawa)
- Tara Slone's Joydrop (Guelph)
- Tom Cochrane (Hamilton)

== Season 4 overview ==
In season 4, the tour started in Niagara Falls, Ontario, home of Derek Sanderson. Live tour musical performances include appearances by:

- Tim Hicks (Niagara Falls)
- Matt Mays (Truro)
- Bleeker (Orillia)
- Brett Kissel (Airdrie)
- The Northern Pikes (Spruce Grove)
- 54-40 (Cowichan Valley)
- Nice Horse (Lacombe)
- Paul Brandt (Canmore)
- Jess Moskaluke (Regina)
- Steven Page and The Transcanada Highwaymen (Belleville)
- Ferraro (Markham)
- Skydiggers (Brampton)
- Cold Creek County (Cornwall)
- Jonas & The Massive Attraction (Montreal)

== Season 5 overview ==
In season 5, the tour started in Kitchener, Ontario, home of Hockey Hall of Famer Scott Stevens. Live tour musical performances include appearances by:

- The Pursuit of Happiness (Kitchener)
- Walk Off the Earth (Burlington)
- The Trews (Glace Bay)
- The Men of the Deeps (Glace Bay)
- Carolina East (Mount Pearl)
- Beverley Mahood (Aurora)
- Kelsi Mayne (Chatham-Kent)
- Jim Cuddy (Mississauga)
- The Road Hammers (Strathcona County)
- Gord Bamford (Leduc)
- The Dudes (Okotoks)
- Doc Walker (Winkler)

== Season 6 overview ==
In season 6, the tour kicked off in Halton Hills, Ontario, home of former NHL Director of Officiating Bryan Lewis. Live broadcast musical performers included:

- Shawn Hook (Ottawa)
- William Prince (Peguis First Nation)

== Season 7 overview ==
Due to the COVID-19 pandemic, the tour was suspended, as were the Hometown Hockey-themed Sunday national games. During Hockey Night in Canada, a branded segment and virtual audience was featured for the duration of the 2020–21 NHL regular season.

== Season 8 overview ==
In season 8, the tour resumed, starting in Ayr, Ontario in North Dumfries, home of NHLers Jay Wells and Kyle Clifford.

== Series overview ==
Season	Episodes	Originally released	
Season	Episodes	First released	Last released
1	25	October 12, 2014 (Canada)	April 5, 2015 (Canada)
2	24	October 11, 2015 (Canada)	April 3, 2016 (Canada)
3	24	October 16, 2016 (Canada)	April 9, 2017 (Canada)
4	24	October 8, 2017 (Canada)	April 1, 2018 (Canada)
5	25	October 7, 2018 (Canada)	March 31, 2019 (Canada)
6	25 (planned), 22 (actual)	October 6, 2019 (Canada)	March 8, 2020 (Canada)
7	0	January 16, 2021 (Canada)	May 15, 2021 (Canada) 1
8	20 (14 stops + 6 studio-only shows)	October 18, 2021 (Canada)	April 25, 2022 (Canada)

- ^Note 1: During season 7, Rogers Hometown Hockey became an in-studio segment in Toronto on Saturday nights during Hockey Night in Canada due to the COVID-19 pandemic. While there were no full episodes, the series had a presence during the 2020–21 NHL regular season.

== Hometown Hockey Tour Stops ==
Season	Stop	Stop location		Date	Matchup	
Season	Stop	City	Province	Date	Away team	Home team
1	1	London	Ontario	October 12, 2014	Toronto	New York Rangers
1	2	Selkirk	Manitoba	October 19, 2014	Calgary	Winnipeg
1	3	Saskatoon	Saskatchewan	October 26, 2014	Ottawa	Chicago
1	4	Red Deer	Alberta	November 2, 2014	Calgary	Montreal
1	5	Burnaby	British Columbia	November 9, 2014	Vancouver	Anaheim
1	6	Kelowna	British Columbia	November 16, 2014	Montreal	Detroit
1	7	Fort McMurray	Alberta	November 23, 2014	Montreal	New York Rangers
1	8	Brandon	Manitoba	November 30, 2014	Vancouver	Detroit
1	9	Sudbury	Ontario	December 7, 2014	Vancouver	Ottawa
1	10	St. Catharines	Ontario	December 14, 2014	Calgary	Chicago
1	11	Kingston	Ontario	December 21, 2014	Toronto	Chicago
1	12	Peterborough	Ontario	December 28, 2014	Vancouver	Anaheim
1	13	Owen Sound	Ontario	January 4, 2015	Tampa Bay	Ottawa
1	14	Moncton	New Brunswick	January 11, 2015	Florida	Edmonton
1	15	Charlottetown	Prince Edward Island	January 18, 2015	Arizona	Winnipeg
1	16	Dollard-des-Ormeaux	Quebec	February 1, 2015	Arizona	Montreal
1	17	St. John's	Newfoundland & Labrador	February 8, 2015	Montreal	Boston
1	18	Cole Harbour	Nova Scotia	February 15, 2015	Philadelphia	Buffalo
1	19	Boischatel	Quebec	February 22, 2015	Vancouver	New York Islanders
1	20	Sault Ste. Marie	Ontario	March 1, 2015	Toronto	Washington
1	21	Thompson	Manitoba	March 8, 2015	Calgary	Ottawa
1	22	Regina	Saskatchewan	March 15, 2015	Philadelphia	Ottawa
1	23	Prince George	British Columbia	March 22, 2015	Vancouver	Arizona
1	24	Lethbridge	Alberta	March 29, 2015	Chicago	Winnipeg
1	25	Kanata	Ontario	April 5, 2015	Ottawa	Toronto
2	26	Kitchener	Ontario	October 11, 2015	Montreal	Ottawa
2	27	North Bay	Ontario	October 18, 2015	Edmonton	Vancouver
2	28	Gatineau	Quebec	October 25, 2015	Calgary	New York Rangers
2	29	Sherbrooke	Quebec	November 1, 2015	Winnipeg	Montreal
2	30	Fredericton	New Brunswick	November 8, 2015	Edmonton	Chicago
2	31	Sydney	Nova Scotia	November 15, 2015	Toronto	New York Rangers
2	32	Corner Brook	Newfoundland & Labrador	November 22, 2015	New York Islanders	Montreal
2	33	Wolfville	Nova Scotia	November 29, 2015	Florida	Detroit
2	34	Brantford	Ontario	December 6, 2015	Buffalo	Edmonton
2	35	Summerside	Prince Edward Island	December 13, 2015	Vancouver	Chicago
2	36	Sarnia	Ontario	December 20, 2015	Calgary	Detroit
2	37	Oshawa	Ontario	December 27, 2015	Toronto	New York Islanders
2	38	Thunder Bay	Ontario	January 3, 2016	Ottawa	Chicago
2	39	Swift Current	Saskatchewan	January 10, 2016	Ottawa	Washington
2	40	Grande Prairie	Alberta	January 17, 2016	Montreal	Chicago
2	41	Whitehorse	Yukon	January 24, 2016	Calgary	Carolina
2	42	New Westminster	British Columbia	February 14, 2016	Philadelphia	New York Rangers
2	43	Abbotsford	British Columbia	February 21, 2016	Calgary	Anaheim
2	44	Victoria	British Columbia	February 28, 2016	San Jose	Vancouver
2	45	St. Albert	Alberta	March 6, 2016	Edmonton	Winnipeg
2	46	Penticton	British Columbia	March 13, 2016	Toronto	Detroit
2	47	Calgary	Alberta	March 20, 2016	Calgary	Montreal
2	48	Prince Albert	Saskatchewan	March 27, 2016	Chicago	Vancouver
2	49	Winnipeg	Manitoba	April 3, 2016	Minnesota	Winnipeg
3	50	Newmarket	Ontario	October 16, 2016	Buffalo	Edmonton
3	51	Saint John	New Brunswick	October 23, 2016	Vancouver	Anaheim
3	52	Grand Falls-Windsor	Newfoundland & Labrador	October 30, 2016	Toronto	New York Islanders
3	53	Halifax	Nova Scotia	November 6, 2016	Winnipeg	New York Rangers
3	54	Montreal	Quebec	November 13, 2016	Montreal	Chicago
3	55	Windsor	Ontario	November 20, 2016	Calgary	Detroit
3	56	Timmins	Ontario	November 27, 2016	Arizona	Edmonton
3	57	Barrie	Ontario	December 4, 2016	Winnipeg	Chicago
3	58	Stratford	Ontario	December 11, 2016	Colorado	Toronto
3	59	Milton	Ontario	December 18, 2016	Ottawa	New York Islanders
3	60	Petawawa	Ontario	January 1, 2017	Ottawa	Washington
3	61	Moose Jaw	Saskatchewan	January 8, 2017	Edmonton	Ottawa
3	62	Vancouver	British Columbia	January 15, 2017	New Jersey	Vancouver
3	63	Vernon	British Columbia	January 22, 2017	Vancouver	Chicago
3	64	Edmonton	Alberta	February 5, 2017	Edmonton	Montreal
3	65	Cochrane	Alberta	February 12, 2017	Montreal	Boston
3	66	Cranbrook	British Columbia	February 19, 2017	Toronto	Carolina
3	67	Nanaimo	British Columbia	February 26, 2017	Ottawa	Florida
3	68	Medicine Hat	Alberta	March 5, 2017	Vancouver	Anaheim
3	69	Lloydminster	Saskatchewan	March 12, 2017	Montreal	Edmonton
3	70	Ottawa	Ontario	March 19, 2017	Ottawa	Montreal
3	71	Portage La Prairie	Manitoba	March 26, 2017	Vancouver	Winnipeg
3	72	Guelph	Ontario	April 2, 2017	San Jose	Vancouver
3	73	Hamilton	Ontario	April 9, 2017	Columbus	Toronto
4	74	Niagara Falls	Ontario	October 8, 2017	Montreal	New York Rangers
4	75	Haliburton	Ontario	October 15, 2017	Boston	Vegas
4	76	Charlottetown	Prince Edward Island	October 22, 2017	Vancouver	Detroit
4	77	Truro	Nova Scotia	October 29, 2017	Pittsburgh	Winnipeg
4	78	Orillia	Ontario	November 5, 2017	Montreal	Chicago
4	79	CFB Kingston	Ontario	November 12, 2017	Edmonton	Washington
4	80	St Thomas	Ontario	November 19, 2017	Ottawa	New York Rangers
4	81	Oakville	Ontario	November 26, 2017	Vancouver	New York Rangers
4	82	Winnipeg	Manitoba	December 3, 2017	Ottawa	Winnipeg
4	83	Surrey	British Columbia	December 10, 2017	Edmonton	Toronto
4	84	Airdrie	Alberta	December 17, 2017	Calgary	Vancouver
4	85	Spruce Grove	Alberta	December 31, 2017	Toronto	Vegas
4	86	Williams Lake	British Columbia	January 7, 2018	Vancouver	Montreal
4	87	Kamloops	British Columbia	January 14, 2018	Vancouver	Minnesota
4	88	Cowichan Valley	British Columbia	January 21, 2018	Vancouver	Winnipeg
4	89	Lacombe	Alberta	February 4, 2018	Ottawa	New York Rangers
4	90	Canmore	Alberta	February 11, 2018	Calgary	New York Islanders
4	91	Regina	Saskatchewan	February 18, 2018	Toronto	Detroit
4	92	Belleville	Ontario	February 25, 2018	Edmonton	Anaheim
4	93	Markham	Ontario	March 4, 2018	Winnipeg	Carolina
4	94	Brampton	Ontario	March 11, 2018	New York Islanders	Calgary
4	95	Cornwall	Ontario	March 18, 2018	Dallas	Winnipeg
4	96	Bathurst	New Brunswick	March 25, 2018	Nashville	Winnipeg
4	97	Montreal	Quebec	April 1, 2018	New Jersey	Montreal
5	98	Kitchener	Ontario	October 7, 2018	Toronto	Chicago
5	99	Parry Sound	Ontario	October 14, 2018	Carolina	Winnipeg
5	100	London	Ontario	October 21, 2018	Calgary	New York Rangers
5	101	Burlington	Ontario	October 28, 2018	Ottawa	Vegas
5	102	Nepean	Ontario	November 4, 2018	Tampa Bay	Ottawa
5	103	Glace Bay	Nova Scotia	November 11, 2018	New Jersey	Winnipeg
5	104	Mount Pearl	Newfoundland & Labrador	November 18, 2018	Vegas	Edmonton
5	105	Dieppe	New Brunswick	November 25, 2018	Calgary	Arizona
5	106	Boisbriand	Quebec	December 2, 2018	San Jose	Montreal
5	107	Aurora	Ontario	December 9, 2018	Calgary	Edmonton
5	108	Chatham-Kent	Ontario	December 16, 2018	Tampa Bay	Winnipeg
5	109	Mississauga	Ontario	December 23, 2018	Detroit	Toronto
5	110	Collingwood	Ontario	December 30, 2018	Vegas	Arizona
5	111	Strathcona County	Alberta	January 6, 2019	Edmonton	Anaheim
5	112	Langley	British Columbia	January 13, 2019	Florida	Vancouver
5	113	West Kelowna	British Columbia	January 20, 2019	Arizona	Toronto
5	114	Leduc	Alberta	February 3, 2019	Edmonton	Montreal
5	115	Whistler	British Columbia	February 10, 2019	Toronto	New York Rangers
5	116	CFB Esquimalt	British Columbia	February 17, 2019	Montreal	Florida
5	117	Okotoks	Alberta	February 24, 2019	Calgary	Ottawa
5	118	Winkler	Manitoba	March 3, 2019	Winnipeg	Columbus
5	119	Steinbach	Manitoba	March 10, 2019	Winnipeg	Washington
5	120	Lethbridge	Alberta	March 17, 2019	Vancouver	Dallas
5	121	Enoch	Alberta	March 24, 2019	Montreal	Carolina
5	122	Saskatoon	Saskatchewan	March 31, 2019	Calgary	San Jose
6	123	Halton Hills	Ontario	October 6, 2019	Winnipeg	New York Islanders
6	124	Halifax	Nova Scotia	October 13, 2019	Pittsburgh	Winnipeg
6	125	St. John's	Newfoundland & Labrador	October 20, 2019	Edmonton	Winnipeg
6	126	Fredericton	New Brunswick	October 27, 2019	San Jose	Ottawa
6	127	Strathroy-Caradoc	Ontario	November 3, 2019	Calgary	Washington
6	128	Welland	Ontario	November 10, 2019	Toronto	Chicago
6	129	Dauphin	Manitoba	November 17, 2019	Calgary	Vegas
6	130	Regional Municipality of Wood Buffalo	Alberta	November 24, 2019	Edmonton	Arizona
6	131	Red Deer	Alberta	December 1, 2019	Montreal	Boston
6	132	Prince Rupert	British Columbia	December 8, 2019	Buffalo	Edmonton
6	133	Abbotsford	British Columbia	December 15, 2019	Vancouver	Vegas
6	134	Strathmore	Alberta	December 22, 2019	Calgary	Dallas
6	135	Whitby	Ontario	December 29, 2019	Montreal	Florida
6	136	Cobourg	Ontario	January 5, 2020	Calgary	Minnesota
6	137	Vaughan	Ontario	January 12, 2020	Toronto	Florida
6	138	Ancaster	Ontario	January 19, 2020	Winnipeg	Chicago
6	139	Chateauguay	Quebec	February 2, 2020	Columbus	Montreal
6	140	Ottawa	Ontario	February 9, 2020	Chicago	Winnipeg
6	141	Quebec City	Quebec	February 16, 2020	Toronto	Buffalo
6	142	LaSalle	Ontario	February 23, 2020	Calgary	Detroit
6	143	Peguis First Nation	Manitoba	March 1, 2020	Vancouver	Columbus
6	144	Salmon Arm	British Columbia	March 8, 2020	Vegas	Calgary
6	145 2	North Vancouver	British Columbia	March 15, 2020	Winnipeg	Vancouver
6	146 2	Campbell River	British Columbia	March 22, 2020	Winnipeg	Dallas
6	147 2	Edmonton	Alberta	March 29, 2020	Anaheim	Edmonton
8	145	North Dumfries, Ontario	Ontario	October 18, 2021	New York Rangers	Toronto
8	146	Lindsay	Ontario	October 25, 2021	Washington	Ottawa
8	146	Lindsay	Ontario	October 25, 2021	Toronto	Carolina
8	146	Lindsay	Ontario	October 25, 2021	Calgary	New York Rangers
8	147	Belleville	Ontario	November 1, 2021	Ottawa	Chicago
8	148	Oro-Medonte	Ontario	November 8, 2021	Los Angeles	Toronto
8	149 3	Greater Sudbury	Ontario	November 15, 2021	NY Islanders	Tampa Bay
8	149	Tillsonburg	Ontario	November 22, 2021	Pittsburgh	Winnipeg
8	149	Tillsonburg	Ontario	November 22, 2021	Ottawa	Colorado
8	150	Grimsby	Ontario	November 29, 2021	Vancouver	Montreal
8	150	Grimsby	Ontario	November 29, 2021	Arizona	Winnipeg
8	151	Pembroke	Ontario	December 6, 2021	Colorado	Philadelphia
8	152 4	Sydney	Nova Scotia	December 13, 2021	Game between Calgary and Chicago was postponed due to COVID-19 protocols.	
8	153 5	Gander	Newfoundland and Labrador	December 20, 2021	Game between Montreal and NY Islanders was postponed due to the postponement of all cross-border games.	
8	154 5	No event		December 27, 2021	Games between Ottawa and Washington, Toronto and Columbus were postponed due to COVID-19 concerns.	
8	155 5	Six Nations	Ontario	January 3, 2022	Edmonton	New York Rangers
8	153	Lloydminster	Saskatchewan	March 21, 2022	Montreal	Boston
8	154	Grande Prairie	Alberta	March 28, 2022	Vancouver	St. Louis
8	155	Edmonton	Alberta	April 4, 2022	Toronto	Tampa Bay
8	156	Prince George	British Columbia	April 11, 2022	Winnipeg	Montreal
8	157	Campbell River	British Columbia	April 18, 2022	Calgary	Chicago
8	158	North Vancouver	British Columbia	April 25, 2022	Philadelphia	Chicago

== Notes ==
- ^Note 2: On March 11, 2020, the remaining dates on the Rogers Hometown Hockey Tour were cancelled due to concerns resulting from the COVID-19 pandemic, with the intention of the remaining episodes originating from the Sportsnet studio in Toronto. On March 12, 2020, the NHL announced the suspension of the 2019–20 season due to the coronavirus pandemic.
- ^Note 3: On November 10, 2021, Rogers announced the Sudbury stop scheduled for November 15 was postponed due to concerns resulting from the COVID-19 pandemic.
- ^Note 4: On December 13, 2021, the Hometown Hockey broadcast from Sydney took place as scheduled, but the live game between the Calgary Flames and the Chicago Blackhawks was postponed due to COVID-19 protocols involving the Flames. No other games were scheduled on that date.
- ^Note 5: On December 16, 2021, Rogers announced the pausing of all tour stops through the end of January 2022 due to concerns resulting from the COVID-19 pandemic. Regularly scheduled broadcasts will instead originate from the Sportsnet studio in Toronto. The live game between the Montreal Canadiens and the New York Islanders on December 20, 2021, was postponed due to the league-wide decision to postpone all cross-border games through December 23 amid COVID-19 concerns. All NHL games scheduled for December 27, 2021, were postponed due to a league-wide pause amid COVID-19 concerns. The two games originally scheduled for January 3, 2022 (Carolina at Toronto, Minnesota at Ottawa) were postponed due to capacity restrictions for games played in Ontario. The Rogers Hometown Hockey broadcast would be replaced by the MSG feed of the game between the Edmonton Oilers and the New York Rangers.
