= Viberate =

Studio album by Joydrop
- Released: July 17, 2001
- Genre: Alternative rock
- Label: Tommy Boy
- Producer: Garth Richardson

Joydrop chronology
Metasexual (1998)	Viberate (2001)

Viberate is the second album by Canadian alternative rock band Joydrop. It was produced by Garth Richardson and released by Tommy Boy Records on July 17, 2001.

== Critical reception ==
Professional ratings
Review scores
Source	Rating
AllMusic	4.5/5 stars
Rockpile	3/4 stars

Billboard called the album "a set of grunge licks colored by strained idealism" but criticized lead singer Tara Slone's vocals, stating that "her voice rarely delves as deep as the words she sings, tending to remain tightly restrained." Shawn Nicholls, writing for AllMusic, called Viberate "very dynamic", praising Slone's vocals and the album's lyrical content. Greg Barr of the Houston Press praised the album's production, stating that "it was a wise move to hire producer and fellow Canuck GGGarth Richardson" and "the acid-trip instrumentation goes a long way."

Music critic Annie Zaleski wrote for the Boston Phoenix that "Joydrop benefit from the work of GGGarth Richardson, but Tara Slone's forceful vocals are the central feature here." Andre Calilhanna of Rockpile Magazine called the album a "sterile, politically correct brand of pop rock" and "uninspired material", criticizing the album's "lack of soul". Monica Kendrick of the Chicago Reader called the album "the product of some Random Cliche Generator", stating that "sinister guitars chime like the intro to a Metallica ballad but lead into half-assed Alanis Morissette imitations"

== Charts ==
Chart (2001)	Peak position
Top 25 Specialty Airplay (Hits)	8

== Track listing ==
No.	Title	Length
1.	"Thick Skin"	4:13
2.	"American Dreamgirl"	3:46
3.	"Sometimes Wanna Die"	3:16
4.	"Life On The Sun"	4:32
5.	"Swan Song"	4:00
6.	"Replaced"	4:06
7.	"Viberate"	4:40
8.	"This Is Not Real"	3:57
9.	"Expiry Dates"	3:36
10.	"Do You Believe"	5:09
11.	"Embrace"	4:23
12.	"Metasexual"	6:43
