= John Tuttle (organist) =

John Tuttle FAGO FRCO FRCCO D.S.Litt. (hon) (born January 17, 1946, in Bryn Mawr, Pennsylvania) is an organist and choral conductor living in Toronto, Ontario, Canada.

He is currently director of music at Trinity College, Toronto, and professor of organ and university organist at the University of Toronto. He is also the founding conductor and former artistic director of the Exultate Chamber Singers, and was organist and choirmaster at St. Thomas's Anglican Church from 1989 until his retirement in 2016.

He has recorded numerous albums with the Exultate Chamber Singers and the Canadian Children's Opera Company, including Derek Holman's Sir Christëmas (1989); A Choral Flourish (1991); Make We Joy! (1994); Stephen Chatman's Dandelion Parachutes (1993); Creatures Great and Small (1999); The Present Time (2001) and All Around the Circle (2005).

He received his B.Mus from the Curtis Institute of Music in Philadelphia, Pennsylvania, where he studied with Alexander McCurdy. In 2004 he was awarded a Doctor of Sacred Letters (honoris causa) from Trinity College, Toronto.
