= Charlie Rhindress =

Canadian actor

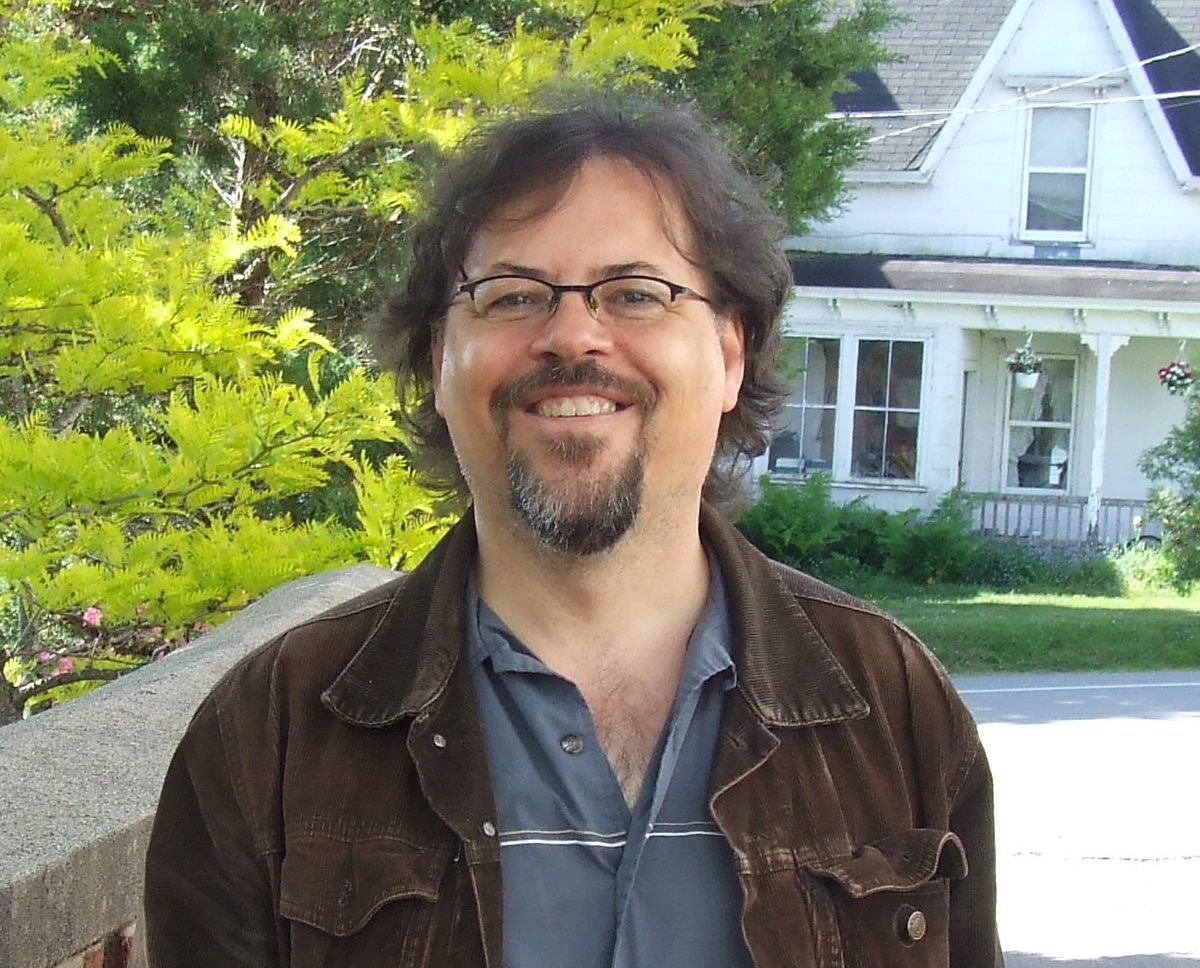
- Born: May 9, 1966 (age 60); Amherst, Nova Scotia
- Education: Mount Allison University
- Writing career
- Period: 1991 to present
- Genres: Actor, Writer, Director, Producer
- Notable works: The Maritime Way of Life (1997); Flying On Her Own (2000); I'm Not What I Seem (2016); Stompin' Tom: The Myth and the Man (2019)

Charlie Rhindress (born May 9, 1966) is an actor, writer, director, and producer living in his hometown of Amherst, Nova Scotia. He was educated at Mount Allison University and is a co-founder and former artistic director of Live Bait Theatre, based in Sackville, New Brunswick.

To date, Rhindress has had eighteen of his plays produced, including The Maritime Way of Life, which was nominated for a Canadian Comedy award as Best New Play, and Flying On Her Own, based on the life of the late Canadian singer-songwriter, Rita MacNeil. The latter was published by Playwrights Canada Press in 2008. Three of Rhindress's plays have been produced at Ship's Company Theatre in Parrsboro, Nova Scotia: Ivor Johnson's Neighbours (2009), The Maritime Way of Life (2012), and Making Contact (2013). Charlie has also written or co-written more than 30 dinner theatre scripts.

The Canadian Encyclopedia states that Rhindress's work "suggests that New Brunswick is fertile ground for popular comedy. Of particular note is Rhindress's The Maritime Way of Life (1999), a dark satire on traditional East Coast lifestyles and personalities. Despite its vicious sarcasm, extensive cross-dressing, and absurd humour, The Maritime Way of Life is very popular with Atlantic audiences."

His first book, I'm Not What I Seem - The Many Stories of Rita MacNeil's Life, was published by Formac Publishing in 2016. It was a bestseller in the Maritimes and was shortlisted for the Best First Book Award from the Atlantic Books Awards. His second book, Stompin' Tom Connors: The Myth and the Man, was released in September 2019 and has also appeared on multiple bestseller lists. Rhindress's latest book, Nova Scotia's Stars of Song, was published in the fall of 2024 and has also been very well received.

Rhindress has acted in over fifty productions at theatres across Canada. His film and television credits include Red Rover, Trailer Park Boys, Haven, Mr. D, Chapelwaite, and Moonshine. He also starred in a popular television commercial for Pro-Line that aired for over two years.

His directing credits include the premiere of Cathy Jones' one-woman show, Me, Dad and the Hundred Boyfriends at Theatre Passe Muraille in Toronto, and The Compleat Wrks of Wllm Shkspr (abridged) at Neptune Theatre in Halifax, for which he received a Merritt award nomination as Best Director. He is the former Associate Artist for Neptune and a former Artistic Producer of Eastern Front Theatre.

Much of Rhindress's career has focused on telling the stories of Canada's Maritime provinces and its people. In addition to his works about Rita MacNeil and Stompin' Tom Connors, he has written about The Great Amherst Mystery and a famous murder case from Sackville, New Brunswick. He has adapted novels by Maritime writers Charles G.D. Roberts and Bruce Graham for the stage. In Sackville, New Brunswick, he helped establish the Sackville Arts Wall. He has also worked extensively with The Anne Murray Centre, creating and presenting special events, including The Maritime Music Fest. He is the creator and current executive director of Esther Fest, a celebration of Esther Cox and The Great Amherst Mystery in his hometown of Amherst, Nova Scotia. He is also the artistic director of Stage East, a company producing live theatrical and musical events telling the stories of the Maritimes and its people. In that capacity, he created musical tributes to Rita MacNeil and Anne Murray, which have toured Nova Scotia and New Brunswick to great acclaim.

Rhindress has been awarded the New Brunswick Arts Award of Merit for contribution to the Cultural Life of New Brunswick, a Lifetime Achievement Award from Playwrights Atlantic Resource Centre for his contributions to Atlantic Canadian Theatre, and an Established Artist Recognition Award from the province of Nova Scotia.

== Works ==
=== Plays ===
- Guilty! The Story of the Great Amherst Mystery (1991, revised 1993)
- Elvis Presley Is Alive and Well and Living in Sackville (1992)
- A Christmas Carol (1992)
- It's a Wonderful Christmas (1993)
- Gates Motel (1994)
- Under the Night (1996) with composer/lyricist Dean Burry
- The Maritime Way of Life (1997, revised 1999)
- Flying On Her Own (2000, revised 2004) featuring the songs of Rita MacNeil
- Home and Away (2003) with composer/lyricist Dean Burry
- The Heart That Knows (2008) with composer/lyricist Dean Burry (adapted from the novel by Charles G.D. Roberts)
- Ivor Johnson's Neighbours based on the novel by Bruce Graham (2009)
- Boo (2009)
- Making Contact (2013)
- Selfie (2015) with original music by Alex Rhindress
- Reader Be Thou Also Ready (2015) based on the novel by Robert James
- The War of Conditioning (March 2019)
- Life Happens (Premiered online July 2020)
- We're Still Here: Tales from 2020 and Beyond (March 2023)

=== Books ===
- I'm Not What I Seem - The Many Stories of Rita MacNeil's Life (2016)
- Stompin' Tom Connors: The Myth and the Man - An Unauthorized Biography (2019)
- Nova Scotia's Stars of Song (2024)
- Thank You, Anne (2025) - Compiled and edited by Rhindress
