= Reason to Believe (disambiguation) =

"Reason to Believe" is a song by Tim Hardin, covered by the Carpenters, Rod Stewart, and others.

Reason to Believe may also refer to:

== Albums ==
- Reason to Believe (Pennywise album), 2008
- Reason to Believe (Rita MacNeil album) or the title song, 1988
- Reason to Believe: The Complete Mercury Studio Recordings, by Rod Stewart, 2002

== Songs ==
- "Reason to Believe" (Lionel Richie song), 2007
- "Reason to Believe", by Arch Enemy from Will to Power, 2017
- "Reason to Believe", by Bruce Springsteen from Nebraska, 1982
- "Reason to Believe", by Dashboard Confessional from Dusk and Summer, 2006
- "Reason to Believe", by Joyce Manor from 40 oz. to Fresno, 2022
- "Reason to Believe", by Sum 41 from Screaming Bloody Murder, 2011

== Other uses ==
- A Reason to Believe, a 1995 American film directed by Douglas Tirola
- Reason to Believe, a 2022 Legacy series novel by Rebecca Yarros
