= Monday Night Hockey =

Monday Night Hockey may refer to:

- Monday Night Hockey (Sportsnet) (2022–2024, 2026–present), on the NHL on Sportsnet
- Prime Monday Night Hockey (2024–2026), on the NHL on Prime

== See also ==
- Hometown Hockey, a Sportsnet NHL broadcast aired Monday nights during the 2021–22 season
