= Adaptations of The Hobbit =

The first authorised adaptation of J. R. R. Tolkien's 1937 novel The Hobbit was a stage production by St. Margaret's School, Edinburgh in March 1953. Subsequently, The Hobbit has been adapted for a variety of media including stage, screen, radio, board games and video games.

Several of these adaptations have received critical recognition of their own, including a video game that won the Golden Joystick Award, a scenario of a war game that won an Origins Award, and an animated picture nominated for a Hugo Award.

== Dramatisations ==
=== Film and television ===
- The 1967 short animated film The Hobbit was the first film production of The Hobbit. It was directed by Gene Deitch in Czechoslovakia. American film producer William L. Snyder obtained the rights to the novel from the Tolkien estate very cheaply while it was still largely unknown, with the proviso that he produce a "full-colour film" by 30 June 1966, and immediately set about producing a feature-length film, with a screenplay by Deitch. The project fell through, but after the explosion in the novel's popularity, Snyder realized that his contract had not required the film to be of any length: he, therefore, instructed Deitch to create a 12-minute film based on his earlier work so that he could retain his rights. He later sold the rights for around $100,000 (not adjusted for inflation). The final project has very little to do with the source material.
- The Hobbit, an animated version of the story produced by Rankin/Bass, debuted as a television movie in the United States in 1977. Romeo Muller won a Peabody Award for the teleplay. The film was also nominated for the Hugo Award for Best Dramatic Presentation, but lost to Star Wars.
- The BBC children's television series Jackanory, for its 3000th programme, presented an adaptation of The Hobbit in 1979. It was narrated by Bernard Cribbins, Maurice Denham, Jan Francis and David Wood. According to Wood, the release of the production on video has been repeatedly stopped by the Tolkien Estate.
- A Soviet 1985 television play Сказочное путешествие мистера Бильбо Беггинса Хоббита ("The Fantastic Journey of the Hobbit Mr. Bilbo Baggins") aired on the Leningrad TV Channel.
- A 1991 unreleased Soviet-Russian cartoon Treasures under the mountain by Argus International studio (with English subtitles)
- The Finnish live-action television miniseries Hobitit, from 1993, is an adaptation of The Lord of the Rings rather than The Hobbit (although it shows a flashback to Bilbo's encounter with Gollum). The name, literally "The Hobbits", reflects the fact that it follows only the storyline of Frodo and Sam (large battles and other events were beyond the means of the relatively simple TV series).
- A live-action film version was announced on 18 December 2007, to be co-produced by MGM and New Line Cinema, and produced by The Lord of the Rings director Peter Jackson. The narrative of the film was expanded and split over two parts. Guillermo del Toro was originally signed on to direct both parts but withdrew from the project in May 2010, leaving Jackson as director. It was announced on 22 October 2010, after months of speculation, that Martin Freeman would play Bilbo Baggins. The casting had been uncertain due to the unexpected success of the summer BBC adaptation of Sherlock and Freeman's subsequent filming commitments for the second series. Filming began on 21 March 2011. The adaptation includes a new character that did not appear in the original book, Tauriel, who is the head of the Elven guard, and played by Evangeline Lilly. On 30 July 2012, Jackson revealed that there would be a third Hobbit film due to there being so much unused material from Tolkien's novel and appendices. The third and final film in the Hobbit series was released in December 2014.

=== Radio ===
- A BBC Home Service series in 1961, adapted and abridged by Barbara Henderson and read by David Davis in thirteen twenty minute episodes as part of their BBC Children's Hour programme. It is considered lost.
- A BBC Schools series in 1961, adapted and abridged by Sam Langdon under the Adventures in English banner in four twenty minute episodes. It is considered lost.
- A BBC Radio 4 series The Hobbit radio drama is an adaptation by Michael Kilgarriff, broadcast in eight parts (four total hours) from September to November 1968. It starred Anthony Jackson as narrator, Paul Daneman as Bilbo and Heron Carvic as Gandalf. The series was released on audio cassette in 1988 and on CD in 1997.
- American radio station KPFK produced an unabridged reading of The Hobbit, broadcast in October 1968, narrated by Harold Innocent.
- The American radio theatre company The Mind's Eye produced an audio adaptation of The Hobbit which was broadcast on National Public Radio in 1979 and released on six one-hour audio cassettes.
- Hobbitten eller Ud og hjem igen, a Danish language reading by Ove Sprogøe for Danmarks Radio produced in the late 1970s. Music by Bo Hansson and Mike Oldfield.
- Der Hobbit, a German language radio drama was produced in 1980 by Westdeutscher Rundfunk. Voice actors included Martin Benrath as narrator, Horst Bollmann as Bilbo, Bernhard Minetti as Gandalf, and Jürgen von Manger as Gollum.
- Hobit aneb Cesta tam a zase zpátky, a Czech language 3-part radio drama produced in 1996 by Český rozhlas. Voice actors included Lubomír Lipský, Jaroslav Moučka, and many others. Script by Eva Košlerová, music by Petr Mandel, dramaturgy Ivan Hubač, directed by Jiří Horčička.
- Hobbitten, a Danish language retelling by Rune T. Kidde produced for Danmarks Radio in 1998. Music by The Tolkien Ensemble, Hedningarna, Sorten Muld and Kim Skovbye.
- A BBC Radio 5 series The Hobbit radio drama is an 15 part adaptation abridged by Brian Sibley, produced by Dickon Reed and read by Michael Hordern, first broadcast Monday 6th Jan 1992, 19:15 on Radio 5. Transmitted again on 4th Mar 1997 00:30, for BBC Radio 4 The Late Book.

=== Recordings ===
Cover of the cassette edition of Nicol Williamson's dramatization of The Hobbit featuring Tolkien's illustration Bilbo Comes to the Huts of the Raftelves

- The Library of Congress, which produces recorded books exclusively for use by the blind or physically handicapped, has produced three recordings of The Hobbit. The first was on vinyl and read by Alan Haines. The second was on 4-track tape and read by Bob Askey in 1978. The third and most recent was on cassette and read by Carole Jordan Stewart in 2001. The readings by Askey and Stewart are available for digital download by Library of Congress patrons.
- Nicol Williamson played over 20 different characters, each with a unique voice, in an adaptation directed by Harely Usill. Music by R.J. Stewart. This performance was released on four LP records in 1974 by Argo Records.
- Rob Inglis performed an unabridged reading of The Hobbit, for Recorded Books in 1990. It contains original music composed by Inglis and music written by Tolkien himself, and Claudia Howard of Recorded Books.
- Martin Shaw performed an abridged recording of The Hobbit in 1993 for HarperCollins.
- Andy Serkis, who played Gollum in Peter Jackson's movie versions of The Hobbit and The Lord of the Rings, read and performed The Hobbit during the COVID-19 pandemic and raised more than £283,000 ($351,000) for charities NHS Charities Together and Best Beginnings. He called it "The Hobbitathon". Serkis then recorded a professional audiobook of the story for HarperCollins and Recorded Books.

=== Stage productions and musicals ===
- The first authorized adaptation of The Hobbit appeared in March 1953, a stage production by St. Margaret's School, Edinburgh.
- American composer Lila Pradell (1932-2024) also adapted The Hobbit for theatre.
- A musical production, The Hobbit, was staged in 1967 at New College School in Oxford. It was scripted by Humphrey Carpenter, set to music by Paul Drayton and performed by members of the New College School choir. Among the cast were Simon Halsey and Martin Pickard. The audience included a young Howard Goodall and, on the last night, Tolkien himself.
- In 1968, J. R. R. Tolkien authorized playwright Patricia Gray's adaptation for the stage. This dramatization makes changes to the original plot, removing sections and giving Thorin the role of dragon-slayer, amongst other deviations. Many productions of this version have been performed up to the present day.
- In 1972, The Hobbit was adapted by playwright Ruth Perry into "The Hobbit: a Musical", with score and lyrics by composer Allan Jay Friedman and lyricist David Rogers respectively. This musical was distributed by The Dramatic Publishing Company.
- Rob Inglis adapted and performed a one-man theatre play of The Hobbit. This performance led to him being asked to record the unabridged audio-book for The Lord of the Rings in 1990. A year later, he read the unabridged version of The Hobbit.
- The Manitoba Theatre for Young People commissioned playwright Kim Selody to adapt The Hobbit. His version premiered there in 1999. The play is only licensed to be performed in Canada. Various productions have been reviewed as being "whimsical, wild and not too scary" and "not really that exciting".
- Christine Anketell obtained the rights for The Hobbit. As CEO of Anketell Theatrical Productions she and Company Skylark produced a puppetry version that toured Australia in 1997. Christine Anketell was the director, Gilly McInnes the writer, Philip Millar the puppet designer, Mark Thompson the Set designer, Philip Lethlean as Lighting designer, Allan Zavod the Composer and Peter Wilson the Puppetry director. After the collapse of Company Skylark, Anketell Theatrical Productions with Malcolm C Cooke and Associates as Presenters remounted The Hobbit for an extended Australian tour from 1999 - 2000. The production featured 82 stringless Bunraku-style puppets that took about 6,000 hours to make. They were manipulated by 11 puppeteers, with Mike Bishop as Gandalf an actor in full costume. The production toured to outstanding reviews.

== Games and toys ==
=== Board, war and role-playing games ===
The Hobbit has been the subject of several games of various kinds.

- In the 1970s, TSR, Inc. released two editions of a war game based on The Battle of Five Armies, designed by Larry Smith, using cardboard tokens and a map of the area around the Lonely Mountain as the setting. The game was criticized for a lack of clarity in the rules, and praised for evoking the onslaught of the Warg and goblin army.
- Iron Crown Enterprises has produced several games based on The Hobbit:
  - Coleman Charlon designed The Lonely Mountain (released in 1985), which features groups of adventurers entering Smaug's Lair to capture his treasure before he awakens.
  - Also in 1985, Iron Crown Enterprises released its version of The Battle of Five Armies, developed by Richard H. Britton, Coleman Charlton, and John Crowell, again taking the theme of a war game and using card counters and a paper map.
  - The Hobbit Adventure Boardgame [sic] was the last game from Iron Crown-based directly on The Hobbit. They continued to publish the Middle-earth Role Playing Game, a game licensed on both The Hobbit and The Lord of the Rings properties, combining elements from both works.
- The Hobbit: The Defeat of Smaug, also known as The Hobbit: The Defeat of the Evil Dragon Smaug, was published in 2001 by Fantasy Flight Games. It is a mass market race game in which players move their hobbits toward the Lonely Mountain.
- Middle-earth Strategic Gaming (formerly Middle-earth Play-by-Mail), which has won several Origin Awards, uses the Battle of Five Armies as an introductory scenario to the full game and includes characters and armies from the book.
- In 2005, Games Workshop released a Battle of Five Armies tabletop wargame, designed by Rick Priestley using highly detailed 10-millimetre figures sculpted by Mark Harrison, based on Games Workshop's Warmaster rules and designed to be played in a small space suitable for the home gamer. Games Workshop also is expanding its Lord of the Rings: The Strategy Battle Game in the form of The Hobbit: The Strategy Battle Game.
- In 2011, British game publisher Cubicle 7 released The One Ring - Adventures over the Edge of the Wild, a role-playing game set several years after the events of The Hobbit. Supplements so far include Tales from Wilderland and The Loremaster's Screen and Lake-town, with others scheduled for release in 2013.

=== Toys and collectibles ===
- Lego has released brick sets and minifigures titled Lego The Hobbit as part of Jackson's Hobbit film series franchise.
- In June 2012, Warner Bros. Consumer Products and Weta Workshop announced they would offer a "range of authentic prop replicas, collectibles and merchandise based on the upcoming films" in October 2012.

=== Video games ===
Several computer and video games, both licensed and unlicensed, have been based on the story.

- The Hobbit, an award-winning computer game developed in 1982 by Beam Software and published by Melbourne House with compatibility for most computers available at the time. A copy of the novel was included in each game package to encourage players to engage the text, since ideas for gameplay could be found therein. Likewise, the game does not attempt to re-tell the story, but rather sits alongside it, using the narrative to both structure and motivate gameplay. The game won the Golden Joystick Award for Strategy Game of the Year in 1983 and was responsible for popularizing the phrase, "Thorin sits down and starts singing about gold."
- In 2003, Sierra Entertainment published a platform game with action-RPG elements titled The Hobbit for Nintendo GameCube, PlayStation 2, Windows PCs, and Xbox. A version, based on the same character design and story, but using a 2D isometric platform and using 3D characters which were pre-rendered using models from the console version, was also published for the Game Boy Advance.
- In 2014, Warner Bros. Interactive Entertainment published an action-adventure game titled Lego The Hobbit, based on the Lego theme set which itself is based on the Peter Jackson's film series.

== Graphic media and literature ==
=== Graphic media ===
- Fleetway Publications published a fifteen-part illustrated, abridged version of The Hobbit in Princess and Girl magazine in the United Kingdom. The story was published on a weekly basis between 10 October 1964 and 16 January 1965, with each instalment accompanied by five or six illustrations by artist Ferguson Dewar.

Gollum in The Hobbit comic adaptation (1989). Art by David Wenzel

- In 1989, Eclipse Comics published a three-part comic book adaptation with a script by Chuck Dixon and Sean Deming, and illustrations by David Wenzel.
  - Unwin Paperbacks released a one-volume edition in 1990, with cover artwork by the original illustrator David Wenzel.
  - Del Rey Books released a reprint collected in one volume in 2001. Its cover, illustrated by Donato Giancola, was awarded the Association of Science Fiction Artists Award for Best Cover Illustration in 2002.
- In 1998, the Royal Mail of Great Britain released a commemorative postage stamp, illustrated by Peter Malone, in a series entitled Magical Worlds: Fantasy Books for Children.

=== Novels ===
- The Soddit or Let's Cash in Again is a 2003 parody written by Adam ["A.R.R.R."] Roberts. The book consists of primarily slapstick-style jokes, with characters names slightly modified from the original (for example, Bingo as opposed to Bilbo) and a slightly altered storyline. As the book progresses, the story departs further and further from the original storyline that it parodies.

== Music ==
- Leonard Nimoy sang a jaunty ditty about The Hobbit titled "The Ballad of Bilbo Baggins". The recording originally appeared on the album The Two Sides of Leonard Nimoy, released in 1968. A music video accompanied it, featuring sand dunes and dancing girls.
- Paul Corfield Godfrey, who has written a large amount of music based on Tolkien with the permission of the Tolkien Estate and HarperCollins Publishers, wrote a full-length opera on The Hobbit during the years 1971–1976. The work divides into two parts entitled "Over Hill and Under Hill" and "Fire and Water", but the score of the second part only survives in fragments. Two orchestral suites were extracted from the work; the first of these was performed in London in 1971.
- German power metal band Blind Guardian have recorded many songs which contain either tributes or references to the works of Tolkien. On their 1992 album, Somewhere Far Beyond, the song "The Bard's Song - The Hobbit" tells part of the story of The Hobbit.
- In 2001, Marjo Kuusela produced the ballet Hobitti (The Hobbit in Finnish) with music by Aulis Sallinen for the Finnish National Opera.
- Dean Burry was commissioned by the Canadian Children's Opera Chorus to write an operatic version of the story for piano and choir to be performed in 2004. The performance rights were subsequently locked up by Tolkien Enterprises before being released in 2006. The Sarasota Youth Opera of the Sarasota Opera then requested full orchestration. With that and some revisions by the composer, the second version premiered on 9 and 10 May 2008 in the United States and was conducted by Lance Inouye.
