= Budweiser Stage at Home =

2020 Canadian music performance series

Budweiser Stage at Home is a Canadian music performance series which aired on Citytv in 2020. Created in partnership with Live Nation Entertainment as a response to the COVID-19 pandemic in Canada, the series broadcast live concert performances by the artists who had been scheduled to play Toronto's annual summer Budweiser Stage concert series before the pandemic forced the cancellation of public events. The series was broadcast in Canada by Citytv, and streamed internationally on Live Nation's website.

The series was hosted by Tara Slone. Performers on the series included The Black Crowes and The Trews on May 30, Blue Rodeo and Alan Doyle on June 6, Barenaked Ladies and Walk Off the Earth on June 13, John Legend and Lennon Stella on June 20, Dallas Smith and Dean Brody on July 11, City and Colour and Leon Bridges on July 18, Alanis Morissette and The Beaches on July 25, and a special album launch party for Arkells' album Campfire Chords on August 29.

Slone received a Canadian Screen Award nomination for Best Host in a Talk Show or Entertainment News Series at the 9th Canadian Screen Awards.
