= Canadian Children's Opera Company =

Choral group based in Toronto, Canada

The Canadian Children's Opera Company (formerly the Canadian Children's Opera Chorus, CCOC) is a large choral group based in Toronto. The company consists of five divisions of approximately 240 boys and girls aged 6 to 19. The Principal Chorus has about 50 choristers, and they participate as the children's chorus in productions by the Canadian Opera Company (COC). The current music director is Teri Dunn.

== History ==
The CCOC was founded in 1968 by Ruby Mercer and Lloyd Bradshaw.

In July 2011, during its European tour, the chorus competed in the Summa Cum Laude International Youth Music Festival in Vienna for the first time, and placed 2nd in the treble category. In the summer of 2017, the CCOC toured Prague, Krakow and Budapest with their production of Brundibar by Hans Krasa. The choir visited and performed at the concentration camp where the opera was performed over 50 times.

On October 26, 2017, the CCOC celebrated their 50th anniversary with a concert titled "Ruby's Gold" at the Four Seasons Centre. The evening was hosted by tenor Ben Heppner and featured many Canadian singers including Krisztina Szabó, Simone Osborne, Measha Brueggergosman and Andrew Haji, many of whom are CCOC alumni.

== Activities ==
The company's repertoire consists of a mix of contemporary and traditional pieces. The group explores various genres of music including folk, opera, music theatre, gospel, and jazz.

The CCOC performs often; in addition to COC productions, they perform with the Toronto Symphony Orchestra, Soundstreams Canada, the Hannaford Street Silver Band, Art of Time Ensemble, and The Tenors as well as in their own shows.

The CCOC has toured across Europe and Canada and continues to expand its repertoire of music in various languages including English, French, Italian, Serbian, Russian, Mandarin, Hungarian, German, as well as several African languages.

Every few years, the CCOC goes on a tour across Europe with choristers from the CCOC's Principal and Youth Choruses. The tour generally lasts a few weeks, and the CCOC performs many concerts.

== Commissioned works ==
The CCOC has commissioned a number of works in the past, including the following:

- Chip and His Dog (1978, Gian Carlo Menotti)
- Dr. Canon's Cure (1982, Derek Holman/Robertson Davies)
- A Midwinter Night's Dream (1988, 2003, Harry Somers/Tim Wynne-Jones)
- The Snow Queen (1993, John Greer/Jeremy James Taylor)
- The Star Child (1998, John Greer/Ned Dickens)
- The Hobbit (2004, 2016, Dean Burry)
- A Dickens of a Christmas (2005, 2006, 2007, 2010, Errol Gay/Michael Patrick Albano)
- Dragon in the Rocks (2008, Alexander Rapoport)
- The Secret World of Og (2010, Dean Burry)
- Laura's Cow: The Legend of Laura Secord (2012, 2013, Errol Gay/Michael Patrick Albano)
- East o' the Sun and West o' the Moon (2014, Norbert Palej/K.T. Bryski)
- Alice in Wonderland (2015, 2026 Errol Gay/Michael Patrick Albano)
- The Monkiest King (2018, 2025 Alice Ping Yee Ho/Majorie Chan)

== Discography ==
- Dandelion Parachutes
- Creatures Great & Small
- Sir Christëmas
- There and Back Again
- A Midwinter Night's Dream
- Daydreams and Lullabies

== Past artistic/musical directors ==
- Lloyd Bradshaw (1968–1975)
- Donald Kendrick (1974–1975)
- Derek Holman (1975–1985)
- John Tuttle (1985–2000)
- Ann Cooper Gay (2000–2015)
- Dean Burry(2015–2017)
- Teri Dunn (2015–present)

== Awards ==
- National Award for Outstanding Choral Recording (1990) for Derek Holman's Sir Christëmas awarded by the Association of Canadian Choral Conductors
- First Prize (1992) in the CBC Radio Competition for Amateur Choirs, Children's Choir category
- Second Prize (1998) in the CBC Radio Competition for Amateur Choirs, Children's Choir category
- Recording of A Midwinter Night's Dream Nominated for a Juno Award in 2007
- Brundibar nominated for a Dora Mavor Moore Award in 2017
