= Ruby Mercer =

Canadian opera singer and writer (1906–1999)

Ruby Mercer CM (26 July 1906 – 26 January 1999) was an American-born Canadian author, radio host, and soprano.

Mercer was born in Athens, Ohio. She received a Bachelor of Arts degree in 1927 from Ohio University and a Bachelor of Music degree from Cincinnati College-Conservatory of Music in 1930. In 1936, she made her debut as a member of the Metropolitan Opera, portraying Nedda in Pagliacci. She married Hungarian-Canadian businessman Geza Por and moved to Toronto in 1958.

She founded Opera Canada, a periodical for which she served as editor from 1960 to 1990. She also founded the Canadian Children's Opera Chorus and served as its first president. She was host of CBC Radio's weekly show Opera Time from 1962 to 1979, as well as its successor Opera in Stereo from 1979 to 1984.

She became a member of the Order of Canada in 1995.

== Awards and honours ==
- Honorary Doctor of Music from Ohio University (1978)
- Honorary LL.D. from University of Toronto (1995)
- Naumburg Competition First Prize (1934)
- Canadian Music Council medal (1983)
- Toronto Arts Awards Lifetime Achievement Award (1988)
- Order of Canada (1995)

== Writing ==
- The Tenor of His Time (Toronto, 1976), a biography of tenor Edward Johnson
- The Quilicos – Louis, Gino and Lina (Oakville, 1990)
- Articles in Encyclopedia of Music in Canada, Musical America, and Opera News
- Columns and reviews for Opera Canada
