= Mark Blagrave =

Canadian writer

- Born: 1956 (age 69–70); Niagara-on-the-Lake, Ontario, Canada
- Occupations: writer, university professor

Mark Blagrave (born 1956) is a Canadian writer of plays, short stories, and novels, and a former university professor and administrator.

Born in Niagara-on-the-Lake, Blagrave was raised in Southern Ontario and Bermuda before finishing high school in Saint John, New Brunswick. After earning his BA at Mount Allison University in Sackville, New Brunswick, and his MA and PhD from the University of Toronto, he returned to teach at the University of New Brunswick in Saint John and then, for twenty years, at Mount Allison University. In 2009, he returned to Ontario as Dean of the Faculty of Arts and Social Science at Huron University College, where he stayed until 2016 when he settled back in New Brunswick in St Andrews By-the-Sea.

Three of Blagrave's plays have been contracted for professional production (We Happy Few, and Scape by Live Bait Theatre, and Nomentacke by NotaBle Acts Festival) and a dozen others have been produced by university theatres in New Brunswick. His short stories have appeared regularly in Canadian periodicals such as The Fiddlehead, The Antigonish Review, and The New Quarterly. Silver Salts, his first novel, was shortlisted for the Commonwealth First Novel Award (Canada and Caribbean) for 2008. Salt in the Wounds, a collection of linked stories, all connected to salt, followed in 2014, and the novel Lay Figures in 2020.
