= Dean Burry =

Canadian composer, librettist, and educator

- Born: 1972 (age 53–54)
- Origin: St. John's, Newfoundland, Canada
- Genres: Classical, opera
- Occupations: composer, educator, librettist

Dean Burry (born 1972 in St. John's, Newfoundland) is a Canadian composer, librettist, and educator. He is best known for his children's opera "The Brothers Grimm" premiered in 2001 which is likely the most performed Canadian opera with over 600 performances, as well as his operatic adaptation of J. R. R. Tolkien's The Hobbit.

== Early life ==
Burry began his passion in music at age 10. He was inspired by a teacher to compete in piano competitions. He was also interested in theater, writing plays and musicals for his school drama club.

== College ==
Burry first attended college at Mount Allison University in Sackville, New Brunswick. While at Mount Allison, he produced and conducted The Resurrection, Joe and Mary Had a Baby, and Unto the Earth: Vignettes of a War. He later went to the University of Toronto and studied composition.

== Awards ==
- In 2011, Burry was given the Louis Applebaum Composers Award.

== Music ==
=== Operas ===
- Unto the Earth: Vignettes of a War
- The Brothers Grimm (for the Canadian Opera Company)
- The Hobbit (for the Canadian Children’s Opera Company)
- The Vinland Traveller
- Isis and the Seven Scorpions (for the Canadian Opera Company)
- Pandora's Locker (for The Glenn Gould School at The Royal Conservatory of Music)
- A Creature of Habit
- Baby Kintyre
- The Mummers' Masque
- The Bremen Town Musicians (for Opera Lyra Ottawa)
- Angela and Her Sisters
- The Secret World of OG (for the Canadian Children’s Opera Company)
- Le nez de la sorcière
- The Bells of Baddeck
- The Sword in the Schoolyard
- Shanawdithit (for Tapestry Opera)

=== Musical Theatre ===
- Under the Night
- Emily of New Moon
- Rainbow Valley
- Songs of the Island (for the Charlottetown Festival)
- Home and Away (for Live Bait Theatre)
- The Heart That Knows (for Live Bait Theatre)
- Sweetheart: The Mary Pickford Story
- Beacon of Light

== See also ==
- Music Contributors from The Hobbit
- List of Canadian composers
- List of University of Toronto people
