= Derek Holman =

British-born Canadian composer (1931–2019)

Derek Holman, CM (16 May 1931 – 20 May 2019) was a choral conductor, organist and composer.

== Life and work ==
Born at Illogan, Cornwall, UK, Holman attended the Royal Academy of Music from 1948 to 1952 and studied with Sir William McKie, Eric Thiman and York Bowen. He held the degree of Doctor of Music from the University of London and was a fellow of the Royal Academy of Music, the Royal School of Church Music and the Royal College of Organists. He was an instructor in the Royal Army Educational Corps with the British Army of the Rhine from 1952 to 1954, master at Westminster Abbey Choir School from 1954 to 1956, assistant organist at St Paul's Cathedral from 1956 to 1958, then an organist at Croydon Parish Church from 1958 to 1965. In 1960 he founded the Croydon Bach Society. He also held positions at the Royal School of Church Music from 1956 to 1965.

Holman moved to Canada in 1965, working as choirmaster at Bishop Strachan School until 1970 and organist and choirmaster at Toronto's Grace Church on-the-Hill until 1979. He began teaching music at the University of Toronto in 1966. He directed the Concord Singers of Toronto from 1973 to 1975 and the Canadian Children's Opera Company (then Chorus) from 1975 to 1985. He was organist and choirmaster at Church of St Simon the Apostle in Toronto from 1981 to 1998.

Holman was a consultant for The Hymn Book published in 1971 by the Anglican and United churches of Canada. His compositions include commissioned works for the National Arts Centre Orchestra, the Ontario Choral Federation, the Toronto Mendelssohn Choir, the Canadian Brass and the Canadian Children's Opera Chorus.

Holman was an associate of the Canadian Music Centre and a member of the Canadian League of Composers.

== Honours ==
Holman won two National Choral Awards from the Association of Canadian Choral Conductors:

- Night Music (1988), written for Toronto Mendelssohn Youth Choir
- Setting of "Sir Christèmas" (1990), written for the Canadian Children's Opera Chorus

Holman was a Professor Emeritus of the Faculty of Music, University of Toronto, and was appointed a Member of the Order of Canada in 2002.

He died on 20 May 2019 at the age of 88.

Preceded by J. A. Rogans	Organist and Director of Music, Croydon Parish Church; 1958–1965	Succeeded by Roy Massey
