= Arthur Motyer =

Canadian educator, playwright and novelist

- Born: December 15, 1925; Hamilton, Bermuda
- Died: June 23, 2011 (aged 85); Sackville, New Brunswick, Canada
- Education: Mount Allison University
- Occupations: educator, playwright and novelist

Arthur Motyer (December 15, 1925 – June 23, 2011) was a Canadian educator, playwright and novelist.

== Life and career ==
Born in Hamilton, Bermuda, the son of building contractor and land developer Ernest Motyer and Edith Brunning, he was educated at Saltus Grammar School and later (1942–1945) studied English literature at Mount Allison University in Sackville, New Brunswick. In 1945, after graduation and short periods in the Canadian Army and the University of Toronto, he travelled to England on a Rhodes Scholarship where he read English at Exeter College, studying under Nevill Coghill. His namesake uncle, Arthur John Motyer, had also been a Rhodes scholar from Bermuda (1905). Returning to Canada, from 1948 to 1950 he taught English and drama at the University of Manitoba and at then moved to the Eastern Townships of Quebec where he took a teaching position at Bishop's University, which he held for the next twenty years. Among his students there were the future novelist Michael Ondaatje and Scott Griffin, founder in 2000 of the Griffin Poetry Prize. Griffin has spoken about Motyer's influence on his attitude towards poetry:

[Motyer] was able to convey the technical possibilities open to poetry that I had not fully understood. He showed me there was music within free verse that went beyond the confines of rhyming couplets or the metrical movement determined by various relations of long or short, accented or unaccented syllables. A whole new world opened up for me.

In the 1960s, while director of the Dramatic Society at Bishop's he led the development and realization of the Centennial Theatre there. Opening in 1967, Centennial Theatre has played a significant role in the cultural life of the Eastern Townships ever since. In 1970, he returned to his alma mater where he accepted the position of Purvis Professor of English and associate dean of faculty at Mount Alison University. Among other roles in Sackville, he was chair of the classical concert touring organization Debut Atlantic, founded Windsor Theatre and the Mount Allison Drama Program, and was the founding chair of Live Bait Theatre. He died in Sackville in 2011.

== Personal life ==
He was married to and later divorced Janet Speid. They had two children. He was gay, a fact he only revealed publicly after retirement and with the publication of his novel What's Remembered. His partner in the latter part of his life was the composer Alasdair MacLean.

== Published works ==
- Innocence at Sea (play)
- What's Remembered (semi-autobiographical novel about life as a gay man, nominee for the Amazon.ca First Novel Award, 2004)
- The Staircase Letters: An Extraordinary Friendship at the End of Life (memoir about a former student, Elma Gerwin and the novelist Carol Shields, 2007)
