= Rita and Friends =

Canadian television variety show

- Presented by: Rita MacNeil
- Country of origin: Canada

Original release
- Network: CBC Television
- Release: 1994 – 1997

Rita and Friends is a Canadian television variety show that aired on CBC Television from 1994 to 1997. The show was hosted by Canadian country/folk singer Rita MacNeil. It won a Gemini Award in 1996 for 'Best Performance in a Variety Program or Series' and featured many musical artists.

MacNeil's folksy style made the show more popular with Canadian audiences than the show it replaced, Friday Night with Ralph Benmergui.
