= Opera Canada =

Quarterly music magazine

- Editor: Elizabeth Bowman
- Former editors: Wayne Gooding
- Categories: Classical music/Opera
- Frequency: Quarterly
- First issue: 1 February 1960
- Company: Opera Canada Publications
- Country: Canada
- Based in: Toronto
- Language: English
- Website: www.operacanada.ca
- ISSN: 0030-3577

Opera Canada is a quarterly music magazine published by Opera Canada Publications. It is the oldest continuously published arts magazine in Canada. It is an independent magazine separate from the Canadian Opera Association. Along with Opera and Opera News, in the 1990s, the magazine was considered to be one of the three major opera publications in the English-speaking world.

== History ==
In 1960, Opera in Canada (Note: Issue #1 of Opera in Canada was dated February / March 1960.) was established in Toronto by Ruby Mercer. It was started as a publication for the 300 members of the Canadian Opera Guild. The publication was meant to be a link between the Guild members and its readers. Mercer served as editor and publisher until 1990.

== Contents and reception ==
The magazine covers a range of topics including performance reviews, feature articles, interviews, news, and profiles of Canadian and international opera artists. The magazine regularly publishes critical reviews of opera productions and recordings. The publication also highlights achievements in Canadian opera through its annual Opera Canada Awards (The Rubies), which recognize outstanding contributions by artists, administrators, and builders in the Canadian opera sector

=== Criticism ===
In 2022, Opera Canada received criticism for publishing comments on a performer's physical appearance rather than artistic ability. The magazine later posted a statement on social media apologizing to the artist and the opera community.

== Bibliographic details ==
In 1963, the publication's name was changed to Opera Canada. The magazine was quarterly from 1960 to 1974. In 1975, six issues were planned but only five issues were published. Quarterly publication resumed and continued between 1976 and 2004. Five issues of the magazine were published annually 2004-????. The magazine has once again reverted to a quarterly publication.

Over its lifetime, the magazine has had three publishers as follows:

- Canadian Opera Guild (1960–1966)
- Canadian Opera Association (Toronto) (1966–1974)
- Opera Canada Publications (1974–present)

In February 1976 Opera Canada became an independent magazine. The Canadian Opera Association was the former legal name of the Canadian Opera Company used between 1960–1977. With the third publisher change, the magazine became a non-profit organization in Canada. Individual donors and corporations are entitled to an official receipt per Revenue Canada issued by Opera Canada (registration 118929108RR0001). The website and the printed magazine is available to paid subscribers. The magazine's other revenue streams are grants, advertising, and newsstand sales. Each year the publication receives funding from the Canada Council for the Arts, the Ontario Arts Council, and the Canadian Periodical Fund. Printing and targeted advertising within the magazine is delivered by Dovetail Communications Inc.

The editorial succession at Opera Canada was as follows:

- Ruby Mercer: February 1960–1990.
- Harvey Chusid: 1990–1992.
- Cynthia Dann Beardsley: 1992–1993.
- Wayne Gooding: 1993–2017.
- Gianmarco Segato: 2017–2021.
- Elizabeth Bowman: 2022–present.

== Opera Canada Awards ==
With an endowment from the estate of Ruby Mercer, the Opera Canada Awards (The Rubies) were established in 2000. The Rubies recognise and honour outstanding individual achievements on stage and behind the scenes. The first recipients included Maureen Forrester, Stuart Hamilton, and John Cook.

== See also ==
- List of music magazines
