= RBC Amphitheatre =

Concert venue in Toronto

Coordinates: 43.629222°N 79.415097°W

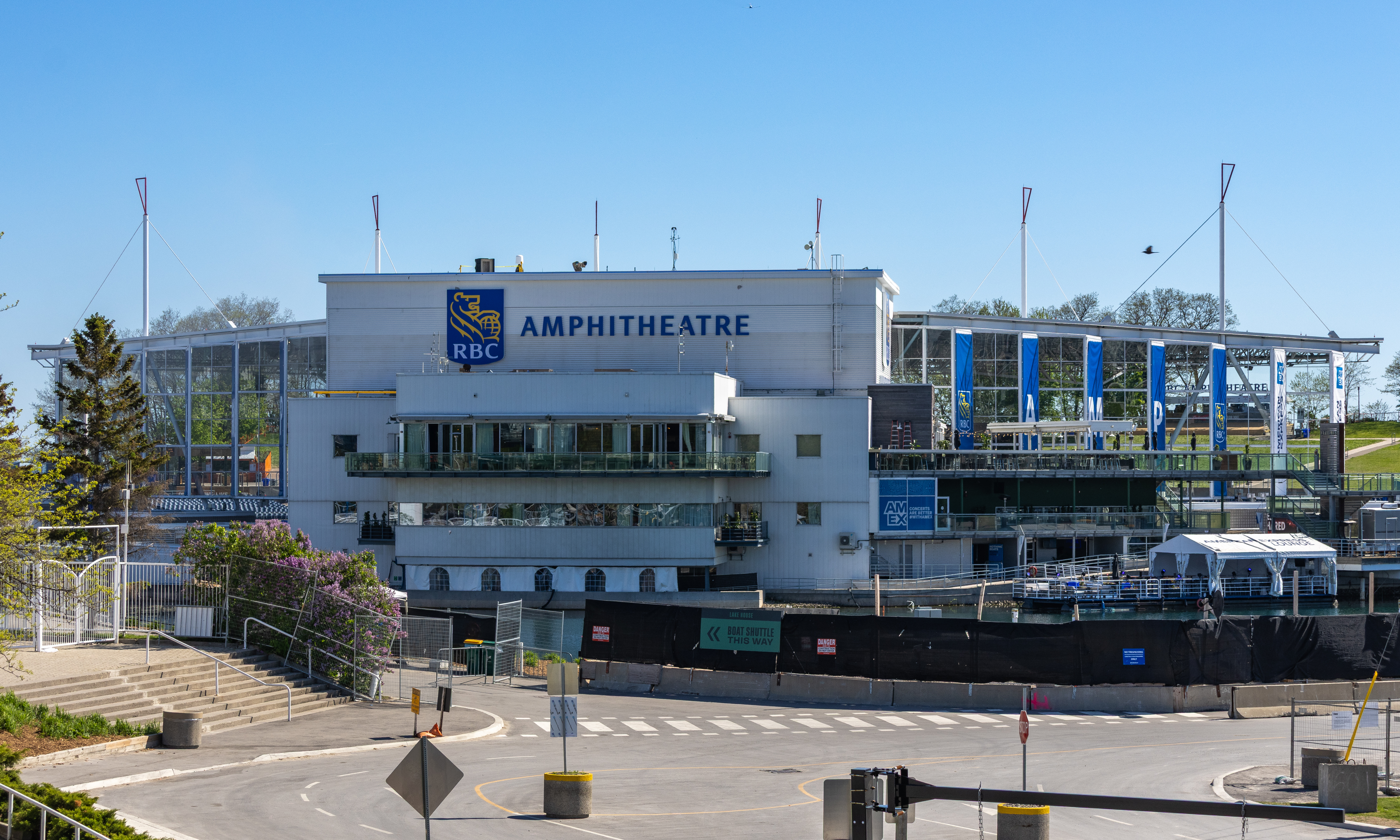
- Exterior view in 2026
- Interactive map of RBC Amphitheatre
- Former names: Molson Amphitheatre (1995–2009); Molson Canadian Amphitheatre (2010–2017); Budweiser Stage (2017–2025)
- Address: 909 Lake Shore Boulevard W. Toronto, Ontario, Canada
- Location: Ontario Place
- Owner: Government of Ontario (administered by Ontario Place Corporation, an Ontario government agency)
- Seating type: Reserved seating, lawn seating
- Capacity: Approx. 16,100
- Type: Amphitheatre
- Public transit: 509 511; 29 (seasonal bus line)

Construction
- Opened: May 18, 1995
- Cost: CA$15 million
- Architect: Michael Moxam

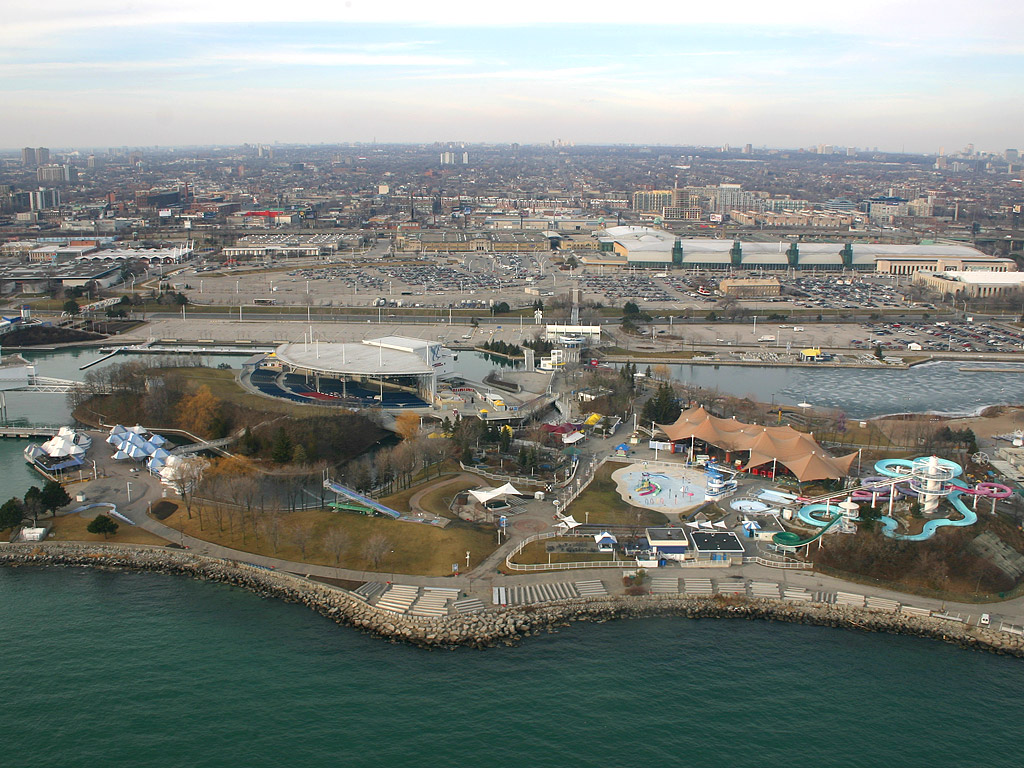
Overview of the site in 2006

The RBC Amphitheatre, formerly known as Budweiser Stage and originally known as the Molson Amphitheatre, is a concert venue in Toronto, Ontario, Canada. It is located on the grounds of Ontario Place and hosts many diverse acts, including genres like rock, pop, country, and jazz. The first musician to perform there was Bryan Adams on May 18, 1995.

== History ==
=== Forum ===
Ontario Place opened in May 1971 with the original Forum as one of the first attractions. The original structure consisted of a vinyl canopy, which was replaced by a copper canopy roof in 1978. Its unique configuration consisted of a round stage, which was upgraded in 1976 to include a revolving stage which slowly rotated before the audience, which completely surrounded it. The venue had a capacity of approximately 16,000-20,000 concertgoers who crowded the four grassy hills and the lucky few who sat on the 2,500 bench seats under a covered roof. Initially a general admission venue, by the early 1990s assigned seating was sold for the bench seats in the covered area, with the uncovered grassy hills remaining general admission.

=== Amphitheatre ===
In mid-1994, Ontario Place Corporation announced that the Ontario government approved an agreement to build a 16,000 seat amphitheatre, which would be funded by MCA Concerts Canada and Molson Breweries. Over the winter of 1994–1995, came the controversial demolition of the popular Forum and the construction of the larger venue on the site. The new venue cost CA$15,000,000 (equivalent to about $28,100,000 in 2025). In May 1995, the new amphitheatre (under the name of Molson Amphitheatre) opened with two Bryan Adams concerts before sold-out audiences. The new Molson Amphitheatre garnered positive reviews in 1995, winning RPM Magazine's "Best New Concert Venue" award.

Van Halen performed two nights in a row at the Molson in August 1995; the shows were recorded for a Pay-Per-View and an unreleased live album.

[[Sammy Hagar]] and [[Kim Mitchell]] have both played the Amphitheatre

In 1997, Rush performed two nights in a row at the venue on the Test For Echo Tour. The first night was filmed for what would have been the band's first concert video released on the then-new DVD format, but it was scrapped. In a 2006 interview, lead singer and bassist Geddy Lee revealed that the DVD had to be scrapped due to issues syncing up the audio with the video, saying it would have cost the band over $150,000 and many man-hours to sync up a new recording with the footage. Although the full concert has never been officially released, much of the footage was eventually included in the Rush R40 box set released in 2014.

On July 11, 1998, the Spice Girls performed at the amphitheatre as part of their the debut concert tour, the Spiceworld Tour.

Depeche Mode performed at the amphitheatre three times: the first one was on June 16, 2001, during their Exciter Tour. The second one was on July 24, 2009, during their Tour of the Universe, in front of a sell-out crowd of 16,128 people. The third one was on September 1, 2013, during their Delta Machine Tour, in front of a sell-out crowd of 16,110 people. The 2009 show was recorded for the group's live albums project Recording the Universe.

On January 6, 2017, it was announced that the Molson Amphitheatre was renamed "Budweiser Stage", as part of a partnership between Labatt Breweries of Canada and Live Nation.

As of late 2024, eight million patrons have visited the venue. The amphitheatre hosted Canadian rapper Drake's annual OVO Festival from its inception in 2010-2015, 2017 and 2019, and 2022, when it was presented as October World Weekend. The Festival has featured performances by Drake, Eminem, Lil Wayne, Jay-Z, Kanye West, The Weeknd, and A$AP Rocky among others.

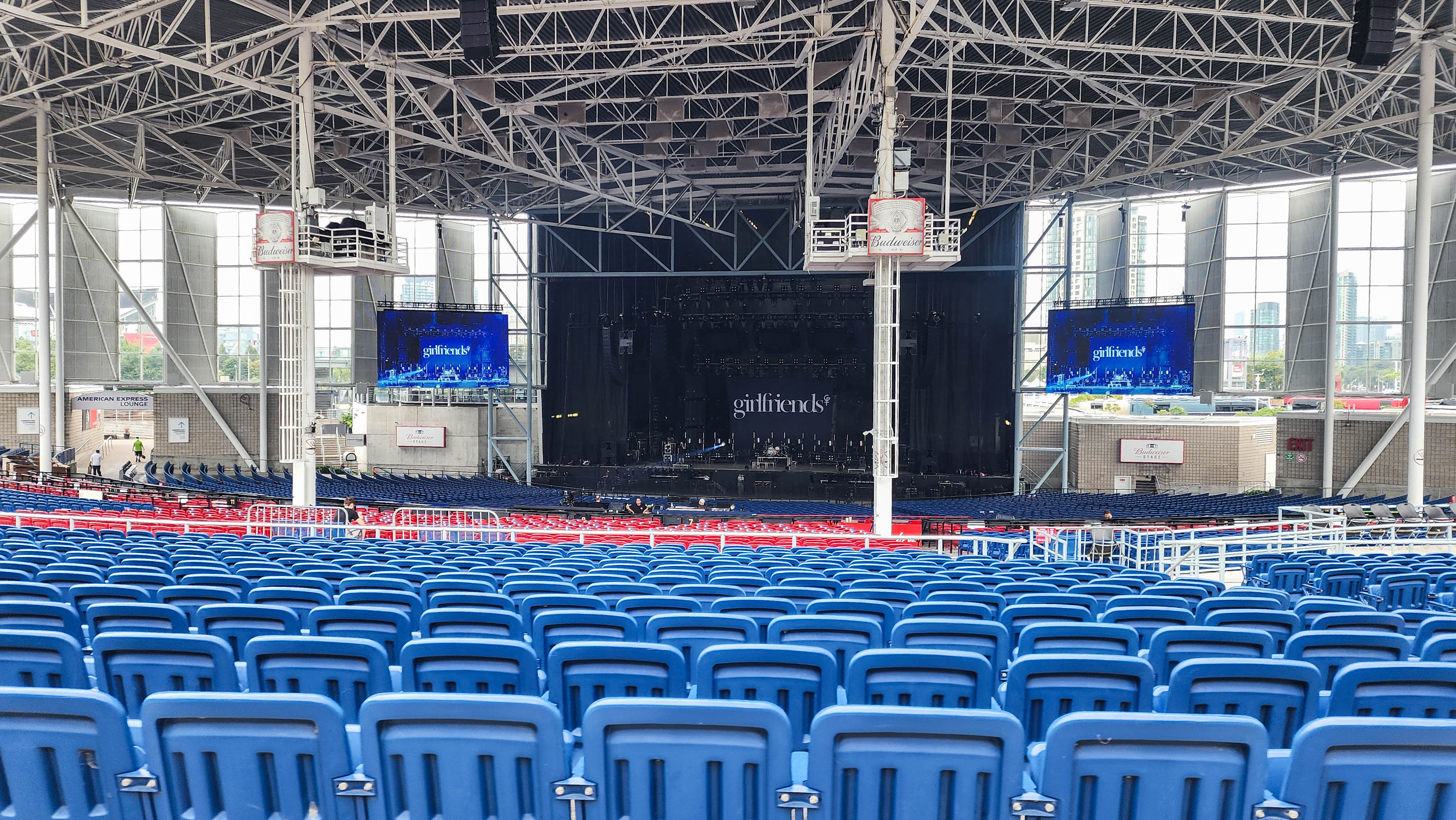
Interior view of the amphitheatre, 2024

=== Future ===
The venue is scheduled to be replaced by a new year-round venue as part of the redevelopment of Ontario Place. The new venue will seat 20,000 outdoors and 9,000 indoors. On October 28, 2025, the venue was renamed to RBC Amphitheatre, as part of a partnership with the Royal Bank of Canada. It is expected to close for renovations in the fall of 2027, reopen in 2029, and debut as a year-round venue by summer of 2030.

== Specifications ==
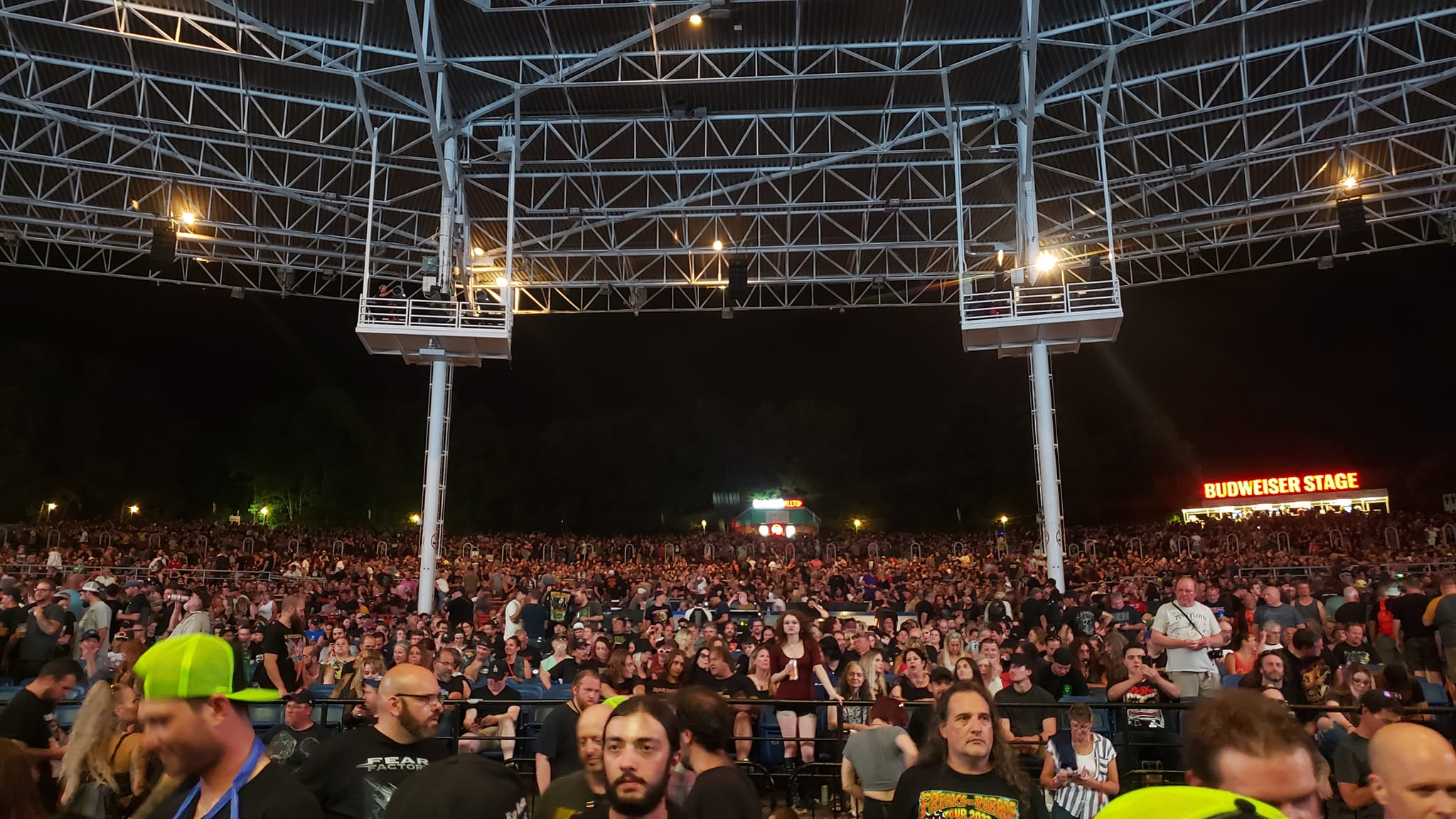
View of audience from GA pit on September 6, 2023

The music venue is open yearly from May to October, due to its outdoor configuration. The amphitheatre has a capacity of approximately 16,000. There are 5,500 reserved seats under the 60-foot-high covered roof, 3,500 seats under the open sky, and 7,000 seats on the grass bowl. The floor area (100 level) has an unreserved capacity of 1,000. There are also Club and VIP seats for season ticket-holders. Two large video screens flank the stage; the video support system gives everyone in the audience a closeup of the performers on stage.

== Echo Beach ==
In 2011, a new open-air concert venue named Echo Beach was opened just east of the amphitheatre. This general admission venue has a capacity of approximately 5,000, which includes raised VIP viewing platforms. There have not been any concerts performed at the Echo Beach venue since 2023.

== Budweiser Stage at Home ==
In 2020, during the COVID-19 pandemic in Canada, the television series Budweiser Stage at Home was created by Citytv and Live Nation Entertainment to provide television broadcasts of concert performances by artists who had been scheduled to play the Budweiser Stage in 2020 before the shutdowns.

== See also ==
- Exhibition Place
- List of music venues in Toronto
- List of contemporary amphitheatres
