= Rita MacNeil =

Canadian singer-songwriter (1944–2013)

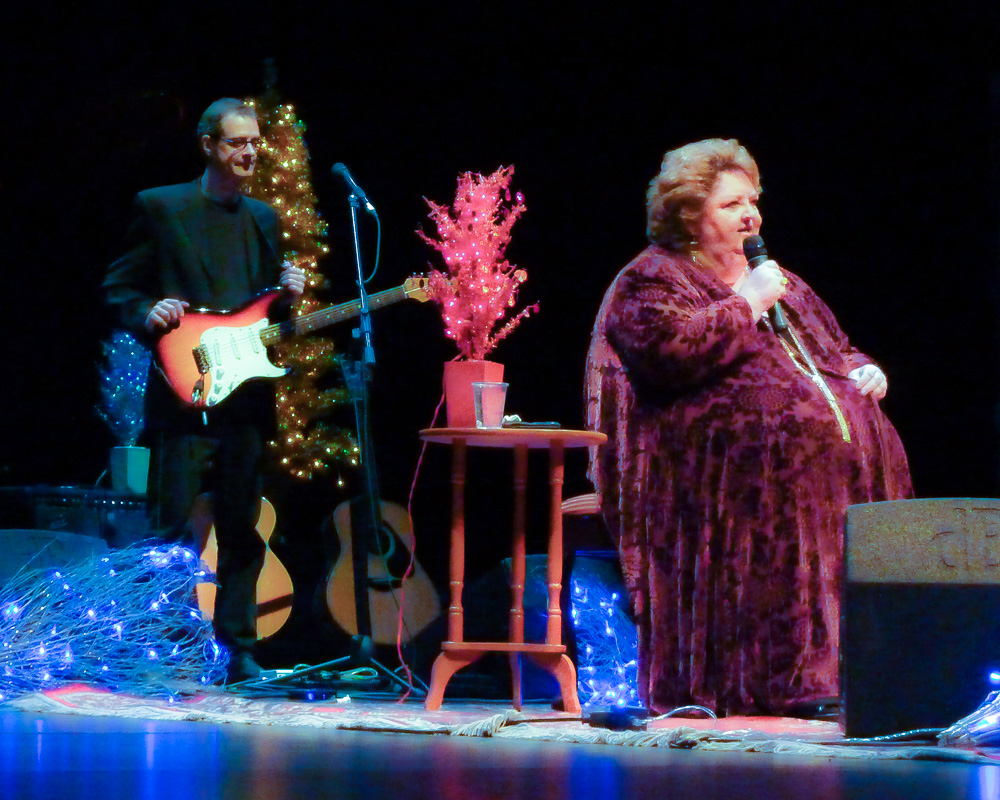
- MacNeil at the National Arts Centre in 2009

Background information
- Born: May 28, 1944; Big Pond, Nova Scotia, Canada
- Died: April 16, 2013 (aged 68) Sydney, Nova Scotia, Canada
- Genres: Country; folk
- Instruments: Vocals
- Years active: 1975–2013
- Label: Virgin Records
- Website: ritamacneil.com

Rita MacNeil CM ONS (May 28, 1944 – April 16, 2013) was a Canadian singer and songwriter from the community of Big Pond on Nova Scotia's Cape Breton Island. Her biggest hit, "Flying On Your Own", was a crossover Top 40 hit in 1987 and was covered by Anne Murray the following year, although she had hits on the country and adult contemporary charts throughout her career. In the United Kingdom, MacNeil's song "Working Man" was a No. 11 hit in 1990.

In 1990, she was the bestselling country artist in Canada, outselling even Garth Brooks and Clint Black. She was also the only female singer ever to have three separate albums chart in the same year in Australia.

Through her career MacNeil received five honorary degrees, released 24 albums, won three Juno Awards, a SOCAN National Achievement Award, four CCMA awards, eleven ECMA awards, was inducted into the Canadian Country Music Hall of Fame and was named to the Orders of Nova Scotia and Canada.

On April 16,2021, the eighth anniversary of her death, it was announced that Rita MacNeil would be inducted into the Canadian Songwriters Hall of Fame posthumously in May of that same year.

== Personal life ==
=== Early years ===
MacNeil was born in Big Pond to Catherine and Neil J. MacNeil. She was born with a cleft lip and palate. MacNeil was the fifth of eight siblings; she had three brothers and four sisters. Her father owned a local store and was a carpenter, and her mother worked in the family store.

As a young girl, MacNeil was molested by her great-uncle who lived down the road from the family home. For many years she kept this to herself, only revealing it for the first time in her autobiography, recalling years of sexual abuse and noting that he had done everything short of raping her. She noted that the sexual abuse eventually ended, unsure whether it was because someone had found out about it or that her family moved away from Big Pond. She called it a point in her life that profoundly affected her because it was a traumatic passage out of innocence.

=== 1950s ===
In the mid-1950s MacNeil's parents sold their store and began a big move that would take them to Sydney, then to Toronto. MacNeil's father worked as a carpenter, her mother worked at Eaton's, and her sister Mary worked at a local grocery store. Alcoholism, already a large part of her parents' life, became worse in Toronto, especially with her mother's desire to move back to Cape Breton. After a terrible night of drinking and fighting, MacNeil's older brother Malcolm ('Malkie') arrived in Toronto, and he and Mary convinced their parents that it was time to move back to Cape Breton, which they soon did.

=== 1960s ===
By the summer of 1960 MacNeil was itching to get away to the city to start making a name for herself. She had just finished Grade 11 when she took a summer job in Toronto, along with her friend Carolyn Tobin, working for CNR. Upon returning to Sydney in the fall, MacNeil knew she wanted nothing more than to begin her singing career, and with her parents' support she moved right back to Toronto to get started.

Like her mother, MacNeil worked for Eaton's, in the Customer Account Services Department By 1964 she had begun taking voice lessons. She had also met a man she described as Sicilian, with jet black hair, brown eyes and very white teeth. She began dating this man although he had told her his parents wanted him to marry a Sicilian woman. She became pregnant in 1965; frightened and unsure of the future, she returned to her parents, who cared for and supported her.

On April 15, 1966, MacNeil gave birth to her daughter Laura. She also started struggling with her weight, which fluctuated from 119 to 183 pounds. That summer MacNeil decided to continue working toward her singing goals as she made a life for her daughter. Leaving Laura with her parents, she returned to Toronto and her Eaton's job.

That fall she met David Langham. By spring 1967 she had married Langham in a small ceremony that included the bride's sister, the groom's brother, and a minister. In her autobiography she wrote that she wore a royal-blue suit and a pink pillbox hat, while Langham wore a suit. The newlyweds moved Laura into their Toronto home in August 1967.

Langham and MacNeil left Toronto in the summer of 1968, purchasing a 78-acre farm in the village of Dundalk. MacNeil's second child, Wade, was born there on April 30, 1970.

=== 1970s ===
MacNeil longed to return to the city and convinced Langham to sell the farm, and in the fall of 1970 they moved to Etobicoke, just outside the City of Toronto. Growing restless in her marriage, MacNeil made one last attempt to save her relationship by moving back to Cape Breton with her family in 1975. It was not enough and she returned to Toronto on her own; for a year she tried to develop her career further while sorting out her feelings. She returned to Cape Breton in spring 1976, became severely depressed, and left again, this time taking her children on her move to Ottawa where, as a single mother, she took jobs cleaning houses and became a welfare recipient. By summer 1979 MacNeil and Langham had filed for divorce.

== Career ==
=== 1970s ===
MacNeil was first introduced to the women's movement in 1971 and it was pivotal to her music career. In 1972 she wrote the song "Born a Woman," which expressed her feelings about how women were being portrayed by men and in the media. Her mother Catherine died that year after being ill for some time, and at her funeral Rita sang a song she had written, "Who Will I Go to See," which she included on her first album.

In 1975 MacNeil released her first album, Born A Woman, a tribute to those fighting for women's rights across the country. By 1979, her career had taken off. She performed for International Women's Day in Sydney, Cape Breton; realizing she could do her music in Cape Breton, she moved back to Nova Scotia. During the move she realized that her interests extended beyond the women's movement to include places she loved. She wrote songs like "Black Rock," "Rene," "Brown Grass," "My Island Too," and "Old Man," which was about her father.

Research done by historians Steve Hewitt and Christabelle Sethna on documents from the now-defunct Royal Canadian Mounted Police Security Service have revealed accounts of the force having spied on feminists, including MacNeil, during the 1970s.

==== "Working Man" ====
"Working Man" was sparked by a visit to the Princess Colliery in Sydney Mines, prompted by the stories of the miners' daily hardships. In her autobiography she notes that the tour guide was suffering from throat cancer, and she had remembered her mother's struggles with it, and as he talked the melody for the song began in her head, complete with lyrics. The song was first released in 1981 on her second album, Part of the Mystery. It was subsequently released as a single in 1988 in Canada and then released in 1990 as a single in the UK. This UK release, peaked at number 11 in the UK charts in November 1990 and became a worldwide sensation and the unofficial anthem for coal miners everywhere.

=== 1980s ===
In 1981 MacNeil released her second album. Part of the Mystery, which included some of the songs she had written upon returning to Cape Breton: "Part of the Mystery," "Old Man," "Black Rock," and the first release of "Working Man." The work leading up to the album's release was immense; to ensure that it would be picked up, MacNeil and friends formed Big Pond Publishing and Production Limited in 1980, which today is run by her son Wade. In 1983 MacNeil released her third album, I'm Not What I Seem.

In 1985 MacNeil was invited to sing at the Canadian Pavilion in Japan, at Expo '85. Upon her return home she taped her first television special for CBC, Celtic Fantasy, at the Rebecca Cohn Auditorium. Unfortunately the successful year ended in heartache when MacNeil's father died in early December.

After MacNeil had performed several times at Expo '86 in Vancouver, the media began encouraging everyone to go and see her sing. Vancouver was a long way from home, and out of MacNeil's homesickness came "She's Called Nova Scotia."

MacNeil was selected along with John Gracie to tape a pilot episode for a CBC television series called View From the Heart, a variety show similar to her later series Rita & Friends. After travelling to Nashville to record "Flying on Your Own" and "Fast Train to Tokyo," MacNeil learned the show would not go ahead. The press suggested Macneil's appearance had adversely affected her chances; a newspaper headline of the time read 'Fat lady with cleft lip not marketable: So says CBC Toronto'.

Not letting this disappointment get her down, MacNeil was ready to release her fourth album, Flying on Your Own, but record companies were unwilling to pick it up, so she decided to release it under her own record label, Lupin Production. Upon the release, sales in the Maritimes skyrocketed. At the same time she filmed a movie called Candy Mountain, in which she played the small role of a singer named Winnie. By February 1987 Virgin Record Canada and A&M Records Canada had taken over the sales of Flying on Your Own, which had sold 22,000 copies. Sales reached 40,000, eventually hitting Gold Record status, and selling 75,000 copies by the end of 1987. MacNeil also won her first Juno Award in 1987 for Most Promising Female Vocalist.

In 1988 MacNeil received an honorary doctorate from the University of New Brunswick, and released two more albums, Now the Bells Ring and Reason to Believe, which was written for her mother. At the same time Flying on Your Own surpassed 120,000 sales, reaching platinum status. By November 1988, Reason to Believe had reached platinum status.

MacNeil's success was evident. Fellow Canadian singing icon Anne Murray covered the song "Flying on Your Own", on her 1988 album As I Am.

MacNeil was given one of the Canadian music industry's highest honours, the Procan award, now known as Socan.

In 1989 MacNeil received another honorary doctorate, from St. Mary's University. She also filmed another television special, Flying on Your Own, for CTV, and released another album, Rita, which she recorded in Vancouver.

=== 1990s ===
In 1990 MacNeil was nominated for three Juno awards: Album of the Year, Female Vocalist of the Year, and Country Vocalist of the Year; she won Female Vocalist.

Her album Rita won Album of the Year at the 1990 Canadian Country Music Awards, and at the East Coast Music Awards along with Female Vocalist of the Year. She also filmed her first Christmas special for CTV, Now the Bells Ring, and saw her Christmas album, Now the Bells Ring, reach triple-platinum status and Flying on Your Own reach double-platinum status.

In 1991 MacNeil won Female Vocalist of the Year at the Juno Awards, followed by Female Vocalist, Album of the Year (Home I'll Be), and Song of the Year ("Home I'll Be"), at the East Coast Music Awards. She was also awarded the Socan Award for Highest Airplay of a Song ("We'll Reach the Sky Tonight"). MacNeil also set out on a European tour, which included what she considered a once-in-a-lifetime-opportunity performance at the Royal Albert Hall.

By the fall, MacNeil had won the fan choice for Entertainer of the Year, as well as the award for top-selling album, at the Canadian Country Music Awards.

In the spring of 1992 MacNeil was given the Order of Canada. Upon receipt of this award, she was asked to sing "We'll Reach the Sky Tonight" on Canada Day, during the 125th Anniversary of the Confederation of Canada.

IN 1993 MacNeil won the East Coast Music Award for Female Vocalist of the Year and received honorary doctorates from St. Francis Xavier University and Mount St. Vincent University.

1993 World Series
MacNeil was invited to Toronto's SkyDome to sing "O Canada" at Game 2 of the World Series. Following the performance, a Toronto journalist made comments about the physical conditions of the Philadelphia Phillies players. In retaliation, a local Philadelphia newspaper took aim at MacNeil stating: "Towns that need forklifts to transport their O Canada singer to home plate, should think twice before describing Phillies as unfit." The journalist further wondered whether MacNeil was paid for her performance by the pound or the note or in Jenny Craig Certificates. In her autobiography MacNeil notes that no retraction or apology was ever issued by the journalist or the newspaper. When asked later if she would sing for another World Series game, she answered true to her humorous self: "Yes, I'd do it, but only if they drive me out onto the field on a forklift."

In her continuing struggles with weight and shopping for clothing in sizes above 26, MacNeil attempted to launch a clothing line, but stores did not seem interested in carrying the line and shoppers were not interested in her style. She hoped to get stores to carry sizes up to 32 and Penningtons considered sizes up to 26, but the 'Rita Line' garnered no interest.

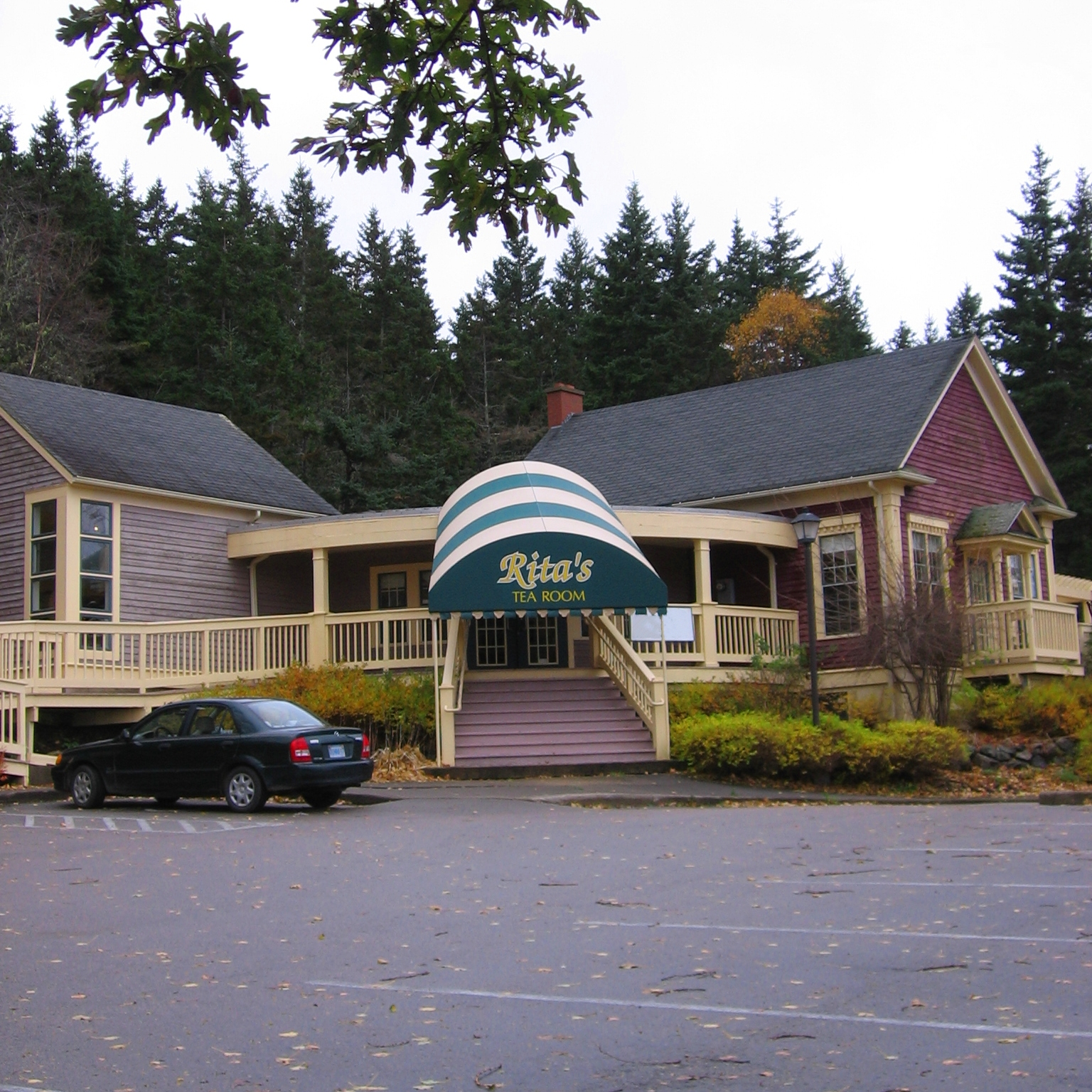
Rita's Tea Room in Big Pond, Nova Scotia

More successful was Rita's Tea Room, which opened in 1986. Originally a one-room schoolhouse where she lived, it was expanded in 1993 to include the foyer, gift shop, kitchen, and additional rooms. In later years MacNeil performed summer concert series in the tea room, which included dinner and a show. Upon her death, her former bandmates continued to perform shows during the summer months.

MacNeil received another honorary doctorate in 1994 from the University College of Cape Breton. MacNeil was given the opportunity to host a television variety series from 1994 until 1997 called Rita & Friends. The show was produced by CBC Toronto in Studio 40. The first show brought in 1.7 million viewers. By 1996 the show had been moved from its popular Friday-night slot to Wednesday nights, and was eventually cancelled.

MacNeil won a Gemini Award for Best Performance in a Variety Program in 1996. She was nominated for the same award in 1994, but did not win, and in 1995 was nominated for Best Performance in a Variety Program for her Christmas special, Once Upon a Christmas.

MacNeil wrote a memoir, On a Personal Note with Anne Simpson in 1998 and it was published by Key Porter Books. She was interviewed by CTV journalist Sandie Rinaldo in a one-hour documentary based on her autobiography, Rita MacNeil: On a Personal Note.

=== 2000s ===
MacNeil produced her final television Christmas special in 2000 for CTV, which included performances by Natalie MacMaster, John McDermott, The Barra MacNeils, Jamie Salé, and David Pelletier, with a special performance by Patti LaBelle.

In 2003 MacNeil filmed a television special titled Rita MacNeil presents The Men of the Deeps, a one-hour special showcasing the coal mining choir The Men of the Deeps. She produced a television special one year later in 2004 called Rita MacNeil's Cape Breton, featuring Jimmy Rankin, Ashley MacIsaac, and The Men of the Deeps.

MacNeil released her second book, Christmas at Home with Rita MacNeil, in 2003. The book shared memories of Christmas in Cape Breton, as well as family recipes and song lyrics. The book also included a copy of her 2003 Christmas album, Late December.

MacNeil was featured in a 2004 episode of Trailer Park Boys, in which she and her band were forced to harvest marijuana at gunpoint.

MacNeil was awarded the Order of Nova Scotia in 2005. She was also awarded the Dr. Helen Creighton Lifetime Achievement Award at the 2005 East Coast Music Awards.

Flying On Her Own, a play based on MacNeil's life and featuring many of her songs, premiered at Live Bait Theatre in Sackville, New Brunswick in 2000. Written by Canadian playwright Charlie Rhindress, it was subsequently produced by Neptune Theatre in Halifax, Nova Scotia in 2002 and published by Playwrights Canada Press in 2008.

=== 2010s ===
MacNeil's final concert tour was in December 2012, 'Sharing Christmas: Rita MacNeil with Special Guest Frank Mills.' Her last television appearance was December 6, 2012 on George Stroumboulopoulos Tonight hosted by George Stroumboulopoulos. MacNeil's last known stage performance was just over a month before her death, on March 9, 2013, during East Coast Music Week. MacNeil was also given 25th Anniversary Award at the 2013 East Coast Music Awards Gala.

A 25th album was released following MacNeil's death titled Traveling On. It is a memorial album containing some of MacNeil's most cherished songs, hand-picked by her son Wade, her close family and friends, and thousands of fans who gave input via social media.

MacNeil was posthumously inducted into the Canadian Country Music Hall of Fame in September 2013.

MacNeil was recognized at the 2014 East Coast Music awards with the Directors Special Achievement Award.

A biography of MacNeil, I'm Not What I Seem, by Charlie Rhindress, was published by Formac in October 2016 and became a best seller in Nova Scotia and PEI.

== Death ==
MacNeil died on April 16, 2013, from complications of surgery after a recurrent infection. Early reports from the Globe and Mail that MacNeil contracted an infection while in the hospital were not correct, and the newspaper later printed a correction.

== Television ==
Year	Title	Role	Notes
1985	Celtic Fantasy	Herself	CBC Special
1986	View from the Heart	Herself (host)	Unaired pilot
1989	'Flying on Your Own	Herself	CTV Special
1990	Now the Bells Ring	Herself	Christmas Special
1994–1997	Rita and Friends	Herself (host)	
1994	Royal Canadian Air Farce	Herself	episode 2.4
1997	Big Sky	Herself	Miniseries
1998	On A Personal Note	Herself	CBC Documentary
1998	Rita MacNeil's Celtic Celebration	Herself	CTV Special
2000	Rita MacNeil's Christmas	Herself	Christmas Special
2003	Rita MacNeil presents The Men of the Deeps	Herself (host)	CTV Special
2004	Rita MacNeil's Cape Breton	Herself	CTV Special
2004	Trailer Park Boys	Herself	Episode: Working Man
2005	Vicki Gabereau Show	Herself	Guest performance
2012	George Stroumboulopoulos Tonight	Herself	2 episodes

== Awards ==
=== Juno ===
Year	Category	Result
1987	Most Promising Female Vocalist of the Year	Won
1989	Best Female Vocalist	Nominated
1989	Composer of the year	Nominated
1989	Album of the Year (Reason to Believe)	Nominated
1990	Best Female Vocalist	Won
1990	Best Country Female Vocalist	Nominated
1990	Album of the Year (Now the Bells Ring)	Nominated
1990	Album of the Year (Rita)	Nominated
1991	Best Country Female Vocalist	Won
1991	Best Female Vocalist	Nominated
1991	Best Album (Home I'll Be)	Nominated
1993	Best Female Vocalist	Nominated
1994	Best Female Vocalist	Nominated
1995	Best Female Vocalist	Nominated
1996	Best Female Vocalist	Nominated

=== Gemini ===
Year	Category	Result
1994	Best Performance or Host in a Variety Program or Series	Nominated
1995	Best Performance or Host in a Variety Program or Series	Nominated
1996	Best Performance or Host in a Variety Program or Series	Won

=== ECMA ===
Year	Category	Result
1989	FACTOR Recording of the Year (Reason to Believe)	Won
1989	Female Recording of the Year	Won
1990	FACTOR Recording of the Year (Rita)	Won
1990	Female Recording of the Year	Won
1990	Song of the Year (I'll Accept the Rose Tonight)	Nominated
1991	Live Artist of the Year	Nominated
1991	Song of the Year (Home I'll Be)	Won
1991	Country Recording of the Year	Nominated
1991	FACTOR Recording of the Year (Home I'll Be)	Won
1991	Female Recording of the Year	Won
1992	Entertainer of the Year	Nominated
1993	Country Recording of the Year	Nominated
1993	Entertainer of the Year	Nominated
1993	Female Recording of the Year	Won
1994	Female Recording of the Year	Nominated
1995	Country Recording of the Year	Won
1995	Entertainer of the Year	Nominated
1996	Country Recording of the Year	Nominated
1996	Entertainer of the Year	Nominated
1996	Female Recording of the Year	Nominated
2000	Female Recording of the Year	Nominated
2002	Root/Traditional Group of the Year (with The Men of the Deeps)	Nominated
2003	Female Recording of the Year	Nominated
2005	Female Recording of the Year	Nominated
2005	Dr. Helen Creighton Lifetime Achievement Award	Won
