= Joydrop =

Canadian alternative rock band

- Origin: Toronto, Ontario, Canada
- Genres: Alternative rock, pop rock, power pop
- Years active: 1997–2004, 2017–present
- Labels: Tommy Boy
- Past members: Tara Slone; Thomas Payne; Tom McKay; Tony Rabalao

Joydrop is a Canadian alternative rock band active in the late 1990s and early 2000s from Toronto, Ontario. The band reunited in 2017. The band consists of vocalist Tara Slone, guitarist Thomas Payne, bassist Tom McKay, and drummer Tony Rabalao.

== History ==
Joydrop was formed in Toronto in 1997. Rabalao and McKay knew each other through recording sessions and tour work and McKay had seen Payne play live a number of times. Once Payne joined they found Slone by placing an ad in Now magazine.

The band's first CD, Metasexual, was released in 1999 on the Tommy Boy label. They performed music from the album at the Horseshoe Tavern in Toronto in March that year. The song "Beautiful" from that album was on the Canadian charts and was used on the film Attraction; it played during the end credits. "Beautiful" was also featured on the syndicated television show VIP, in the film My First Mister, and in the film Ginger Snaps 2: Unleashed (it played during the end credits).

Viberate, the band's second album, was also released on Tommy Boy. The album's lead single, "Sometimes Wanna Die", was a hit in Canada, reaching #11 on Canada's Airplay chart. The song's music video, which featured Tommy Lee, was played on MTV2 in the US during the summer of 2001. "Sometimes Wanna Die" was one of the top 100 most played songs on Canadian radio in 2001, ranking #65.

Joydrop appeared as themselves, performing their two hit songs, on an episode of Special Unit 2.

Joydrop was nominated for a Juno Award for Best New Group in 2002.

On the 22nd anniversary of the album's release, Slone reminisced about what caused the band to break up:

Our fans might not know that our lifespan as a band was cut short partially by circumstances beyond our control. First, our song "Sometimes Wanna Die" was removed from all radio stations in the US after 9/11. Then, as we were getting set to release our second single, our record company was absorbed by a bigger one, and we lost our record deal. We had no more budget to tour or release our new song, and we didn’t own our master recording. This stuff happens in the record business all then time… but it happened to us, and it sucked. Still does.

Following the band's breakup, Slone released a solo album and was a contestant on Rock Star: INXS. Tony Rabalao also went solo and put out a CD under the name Lehlo but plays in Slone's band as well. Thomas McKay is a producer with a recording studio www.exetersoundstudios.com He worked on Slone's and Rabalao's solo CDs as well as numerous other Canadian, American and British bands. Thomas Payne is writing and producing music for stage in Stratford Ontario. As of 2010, Slone is part of Breakfast Television on CKAL-DT (Citytv Calgary).

On April 2, 2017, Joydrop reunited for a performance at Hometown Hockey's tour stop in Guelph, Ontario. The gig led to further performances in 2017, including a show at the Bovine on August 25, 2017, in Toronto.

== Discography ==
=== Metasexual (released September 22, 1998) ===
No.	Title	Length
1.	"Fizz"	3:51
2.	"Beautiful"	3:59
3.	"Breakdown"	4:57
4.	"Strawberry Marigold"	4:09
5.	"Spiders"	3:12
6.	"Dream Today"	3:21
7.	"Cocoon"	3:13
8.	"Over + Under"	4:06
9.	"If I Forget"	3:49
10.	"All Too Well"	3:43
11.	"No One"	2:54
12.	"Dog Star Radio"	4:46
13.	"The Line"	5:02
14.	"Until"	4:20

=== Viberate (released July 17, 2001) ===
No.	Title	Length
1.	"Thick Skin"	4:13
2.	"American Dreamgirl"	3:46
3.	"Sometimes Wanna Die"	3:16
4.	"Life On The Sun"	4:32
5.	"Swan Song"	4:00
6.	"Replaced"	4:06
7.	"Viberate"	4:40
8.	"This Is Not Real"	3:57
9.	"Expiry Dates"	3:36
10.	"Do You Believe"	5:09
11.	"Embrace"	4:23
12.	"Metasexual"	6:43

=== Singles ===
- "Beautiful" (1999) – No. 20 US Alternative Songs, No. 87 AUS
- "If I Forget" (exclusive to Canada) (1999)
- "Spiders" (exclusive to US) (2000)
- "Sometimes Wanna Die" (2001) No. 11 Canada
- "American Dream Girl" (2001)
