= Tara Slone =

Canadian singer

- Born: September 7, 1973 (age 53); Montreal, Quebec, Canada
- Origin: Halifax, Nova Scotia, Canada
- Genre: Rock
- Occupations: Singer
- Label: Orange Record Label
- Formerly of: Joydrop

Tara Kamala Slone (born September 7, 1973) is a Canadian rock vocalist, actress and television personality.

== Early life and education ==
Slone was born in Montreal, Quebec, and raised in Wolfville and Halifax, Nova Scotia. Her stepfather Dr. Tomasz Pietrzykowski was the Dean of the School of Computer Science at Acadia University. She began pursuing classical voice training at the age of 12 with the goal of becoming an opera singer. Her first job was at a Second Cup in Halifax when she was in high school as a barista for a few months before working at Sam the Record Man.

At Sam's, she worked alongside future Sloan member Jay Ferguson, connected with music lovers and indie musicians, which she credits as influencing her taste in music. At the age of 18, she attended first Dalhousie University and then Concordia University to pursue a degree in music. While at Concordia, she switched her aspirations to acting and rock music, and subsequently moved to Toronto, Ontario.

== Acting career ==
In the mid-1990s, Slone played Columbia in the theatre version of The Rocky Horror Picture Show in front of sold-out crowds when it stopped at the Grand Theatre in Kingston, Ontario. In 2016, Slone appeared on stage at the Stratford Festival in the play The Hypochondriac.

In 1997, Slone starred in Night of the Demons 3, and in 1998, she landed a recurring role in La Femme Nikita. She appeared in three episodes. In 2008, she appeared in an episode of the second season of The Border, titled "Prescriptive Measures", as an American pop star who dies early on in the episode, which sparks the main plot of the episode.

== Music career ==
In 1996, Slone became the lead singer of Joydrop after discovering a wanted ad for a singer in the magazine Now. By 1997, Joydrop had a record deal and released two albums. The band had chart hits in Canada with the singles "Beautiful" and "Sometimes Wanna Die," (which also reached #20 on the American Billboard Alternative chart) and was nominated for a Juno Award.

Since the breakup of Joydrop, Slone worked on a solo album with Jordon Zadorozny. Her latest album, Just Look Pretty and Sing, was released on March 6, 2007, but was completed before appearing on the reality show Rock Star INXS in 2005. Singles released include "My Little Secret", "We Were Stars", and "The Perfect Girl." Joydrop reunited on April 2, 2017, edition of Hometown Hockey in Guelph, Ontario, with Slone performing "Beautiful".

Slone competed on Rock Star INXS in 2005, a reality show that sought to find a replacement lead singer for the band INXS. She was the sixth person eliminated from the competition. She previously resided in Toronto, sharing a house with fellow Rock Star INXS contestant Suzie McNeil. The two appeared in an episode of MTV Cribs, giving viewers a tour of their house.

== Broadcasting career ==
From August 9, 2010, to August 28, 2015, Slone served as the host of Breakfast Television on Citytv Calgary.

Beginning in 2014, Slone joined Sportsnet, acting as an on-site co-host for its new Sunday-night Rogers Hometown Hockey broadcasts alongside Ron MacLean. The show was cancelled in 2022 and Slone parted ways with Sportsnet.

In 2020, Slone was named host of a new weekly Sportsnet docuseries called Top of Her Game, which focuses on women's rights through interviews with female athletes, builders and executives. In the same year she was host of the summer concert series Budweiser Stage at Home for the Citytv network, for which she received a Canadian Screen Award nomination for Best Host in a Talk Show or Entertainment News Series at the 9th Canadian Screen Awards. In 2022, she accepted a position with the NHL's San Jose Sharks as a content contributor, and has also joined NBC Sports Bay Area on their Sharks broadcasts. On June 8, 2024, Slone announced she was moving back to Canada to work for Sirius XM radio in music and entertainment programs.

== Personal life ==
She is separated and has a daughter named Audrey. Slone lived for two years near San Jose, California, with former NHL defenceman Dan Boyle.

Tara has since moved back to Toronto. While still working for the San Jose Sharks, she now also works for SiriusXM radio.

== Filmography ==
Year	Title	Role	Notes
1992	Kung Fu: The Legend Continues		
1995	Hart to Hart: Two Harts in 3/4 Time	Vivienne	
1997	Night of the Demons III	Lois	
1998	Twist of Fate	Melanie Sims	
2003	Foolproof	Maggie	
2004	The Straitjacket Lottery	Nancy Leah	
2005	Rockstar: INXS	Contestant	DVD release
2009	Rise Up: Canadian Pop Music in the 1980s	Self	
2014	The Owen Hart Foundation: A Look Back	Self	(Documentary short)

=== Television ===
Year	Title	Role	Notes
1996	Kung Fu: The Legend Continues	Larissa	Episode "Dark Side of Chi"
1997	The Newsroom		Episode "Meltdown: Part 3"
1997–98	La Femme Nikita	Gail (and Gail as Tara Slone)	Episodes "Inside Out", "Darkness Visible", "Noise"
2001	Special Unit 2	Self	Episode "The Wall"
2005	Canoe Live		Producer
2005	Rock Star: INXS	Self	Finalist
2007	Best! Movies! Ever!	Self (Musician)	Episode "Road Trips"
2007–2010	Inside Jam	Co-host	Sun TV
2008	The Border	Kiley Tristano	Episode "Prescriptive Measures"
2010–2015	Breakfast Television Calgary	Co-host	
2014–2022	Hometown Hockey	Co-host / Producer	
2019	Hudson and Rex	Greta Fermi	Episode "Bullet in the water"
2020	Budweiser Stage at Home	Host	8 episodes
2020–2021	Top of Her Game	Host	48 episodes
