= Beautiful (Joydrop song) =

Single by Joydrop

from the album Metasexual
- Released: 1998
- Genre: Alternative rock
- Length: 3:59
- Label: Tommy Boy
- Songwriter: Joydrop
- Producer: Saint

Joydrop singles chronology
"If I Forget" (1998)	"Beautiful" (1998)	"Spiders" (2000)

"Beautiful" is a song by the alternative rock band Joydrop from their 1998 album, Metasexual. The single peaked at #20 on the Modern Rock Tracks chart.
