= Sir Christèmas =

British Christmas carol

"Sir Christèmas" (or Sir Christëmas) is a traditional English Christmas carol. The song's lyrics and melody are by an unknown author, with the first record of the song in the Ritson Manuscript, dating the song to some point before 1510.

== Words ==
Unlike in modern English, "Christëmas" is pronounced in this carol with three syllables rather than two.

The following are the opening lyrics as attributed to Richard Smart, Rector of Plymtree, Devon between 1435 and 1477:

1
Nowell, Nowell, Nowell, Nowell,
’Who is there that singeth so?’
’I am here, Sir Christëmas.’
’Welcome, my lord Christëmas,
Welcome to us all, both more and less
Come near, Nowell!’

== Musical settings ==
An early contemporary setting is that of the Australian composer Arthur Benjamin, published in 1941. His arrangement is for SATB without accompaniment.

A setting was made by the Welsh composer William Mathias in 1971 for SATB and organ/brass/orchestra. Another setting was written by Thomas Yeakle in 1972 for SATB, harp and woodwind, advisedly a krummhorn.

In 1987, Derek Holman composed a setting of this carol and seven other Christmas-related English texts from the same period, giving the title "Sir Christèmas" to the whole sequence of carols. Written for and premiered by the Canadian Children's Opera Chorus, the work is for treble choir and a five-member instrumental ensemble (flute, cello, harp, piano and percussion) -- though the composer also sanctioned performance with piano as the sole accompaniment, the pianist playing the reduction in the published choral score.

== See also ==
- List of Christmas carols
