= Ned Dickens =

Canadian playwright

- Born: 1959 (age 66–67); British Columbia
- Occupation: Playwright
- Years active: 1994 — present
- Notable work: City of Wine series

Ned Dickens (born 1959 in British Columbia) is a Canadian playwright. He authored 16 plays, including the City of Wine series, a seven-play cycle which "traces the rise and fall of the ancient city of Thebes, from its founding by Cadmus and Harmonia to its demise at the siege of Troy."

== Life ==
Dickens was born in 1959 in British Columbia and raised in Ontario. His father was a teacher who taught in boarding schools.

For 10 years, he worked in architecture. He was the director for the Kensington Youth Theatre and Employment Skills program in Toronto, using theatre as a training tool for street youth.

Dickens lives in Kingston and has three children.

== Playwriting career ==
In 1994, Dickens turned to playwriting from acting when he developed advanced glaucoma. He was commissioned by Die In Debt Theatre to write a new version of Seneca's Oedipus . After writing the piece and winning a Dora Award, Dickens wanted to further explore the story of Jocasta, Oedipus's mother. He then became fascinated by "the aftermath of Oedipus's downfall." After six years, Dickens had expanded Oedipus to become a trilogy and decided to "dramatize the entire history of Thebes." In total, the series took 15 years to write. To support himself during this time, Dickens taught public speaking to politicians and worked in construction, injuring his hand in an accident.

In May 2009, Dickens's seven-play cycle, City of Wine, debuted at Toronto's Theatre Passe Muraille. The play involved 233 student actors, 172 professional actors, and 110 theatre artists and was produced by Nightswimming, an independent theatre company. In its entirety, the play's running time is 12 hours. Robert Kushman, in the National Post, described it as a "dizzyingly ambitious feat of producing and a dizzying achievement."
