= Reason to Believe (Rita MacNeil album) =

Studio album by Rita MacNeil
- Released: 1988
- Genre: Country
- Labels: Virgin (Canada); Polydor (UK); A&M (Australia & New Zealand)
- Producer: Declan O'Doherty

Rita MacNeil chronology
Flying On Your Own (1987)	Reason to Believe (1988)	Now the Bells Ring (1988)

Reason to Believe is an album by Canadian singer Rita MacNeil, released in 1988. From the album, the track "Working Man" became an international hit single, reaching number 11 in the UK Singles Chart in 1990 and number 59 in Australia in 1991.

== Track listing ==
All tracks written by Rita MacNeil.

No.	Title	Length
1.	"Walk On Through"	5:24
2.	"Two Steps from Broken"	4:55
3.	"City Child"	4:57
4.	"Doors of the Cemetery"	3:34
5.	"Reason to Believe"	4:33
6.	"When the Loving Is Through"	3:25
7.	"Causing the Fall"	4:02
8.	"The Music's Going Around Again"	3:45
9.	"Sound Your Own Horn"	3:55
10.	"Working Man" (featuring Men of the Deeps)	5:25
11.	"Good Friends"	5:22

== Charts ==
Chart performance for Reason to Believe
Chart (1988–1991)	Peak position
Australian Albums (ARIA)	17
Canada Top Albums/CDs (RPM)	20
UK Albums (Official Charts)	32

== Certifications ==
Region	Certification	Certified units/sales
Australia (ARIA)	Platinum	70,000^{^}
^{^} Shipments figures based on certification alone.
