= Live Bait Theatre =

Live Bait Theatre logo

Live Bait Theatre is a theatre company based in Sackville, New Brunswick, in Canada. Established in 1988, writer Arthur Motyer was the founding chair.

Performers have included Rita MacNeil, Blackie and the Rodeo Kings, This Hour Has 22 Minutes' Cathy Jones, Lorne Elliot, and the Barra-MacNeils.

The company has also produced more than 45 mainstage shows, along with a score of Atlantic-themed dinner theatres, musical revues, and other performance events and playwriting/reading workshops.

Playwrights whose works have been performed by the company include Mark Blagrave, Don Hannah, and Charlie Rhindress.
