= Big Pond, Nova Scotia =

Community in Nova Scotia, Canada

Coordinates: 45°54′35″N 60°32′10″W

Big Pond in Nova Scotia

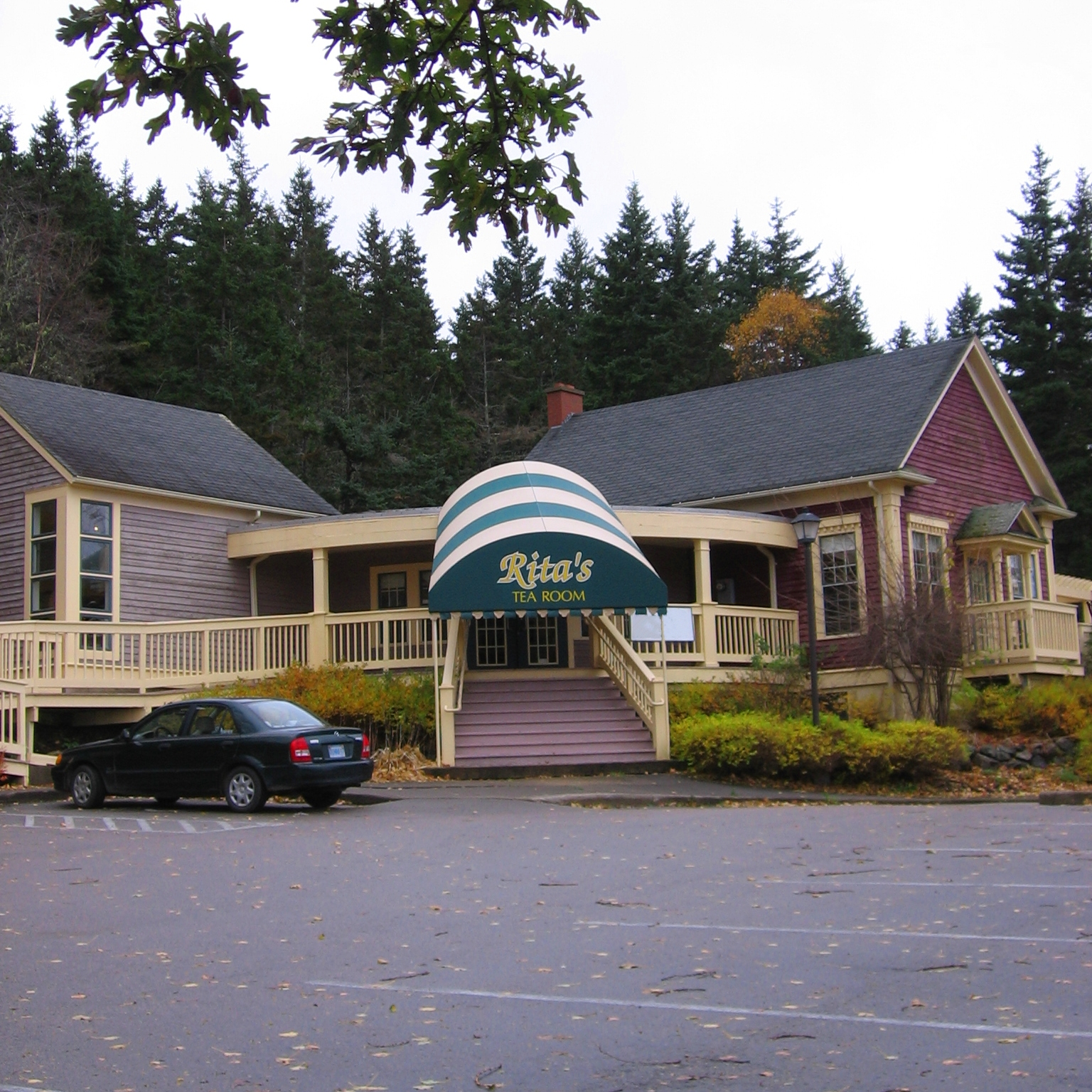
Rita MacNeil's Tea Room is a landmark in Big Pond Nova Scotia

Big Pond (Scottish Gaelic: Am Pòn Mòr) is a community in the Canadian province of Nova Scotia, located in Cape Breton Regional Municipality. on the south shore of Bras d'Or Lake. Big Pond is approximately in the centre between the communities of St. Peters, Nova Scotia and Sydney, Nova Scotia.

The community is named after the larger of two ponds (actually enclosed lagoons) on the lake shore: Big Pond and Open Pond. The Mi'kmaq name for the location was "Naooktaboogooik" which roughly translates to "It stands alone".
