= The Men of the Deeps =

Canadian male chorus

Men of the Deeps
- Choir
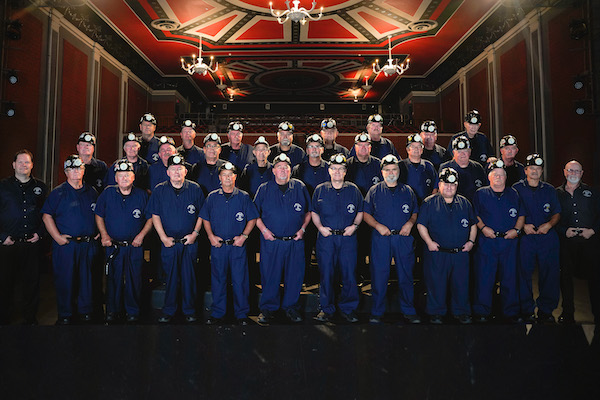
- The Savoy Theatre, Glace Bay, NS
- Origin: Glace Bay, NS
- Founded: 1966; 60 years ago
- Genre: Folk
- Music director: Stephen Muise
- Website: menofthedeeps.com

The Men of the Deeps are a male choral ensemble composed of former and working coal miners from Cape Breton Island, Nova Scotia. The choir requires each member to have at least 2 years experience working in or around a coal mine. They are the only choir where the second requirement is to sing.

== History ==
Formed in 1966, the group has a mandate to preserve the traditional settler music and folklore of the Canadian Maritimes and particularly the Cape Breton region. As of 2006, only one member had been with the group since its inception, Jim MacLellan who is retiring at the end of 2025. Other original members had returned after brief times out of the group but only for special occasions. In this category are both a mine manager and a former president of District 26 of the United Mine Workers of America.

From the group's inception until his retirement in 2017, the musical director was John C. (Jack) O'Donnell, Professor Emeritus of music at St. Francis Xavier University in Antigonish, Nova Scotia. In 1983, O'Donnell's contribution was recognized by the government of Canada, as he was awarded the Order of Canada. In 1993, he was further honoured when he received an honorary Doctor of Letters from the University College of Cape Breton (now Cape Breton University), an honour that was bestowed upon the group as a whole in 2000. O'Donnell died October 25, 2018, age 83.

In January 2017, Jack passed on the conducting and arranging duties to his then-assistant conductor, Stephen Muise. Stephen had been a long-time fan and maintained a close presence with the choir. His father, Yogi Muise, was the Business Manager for the choir. Prior to taking over his role, Stephen provided technical expertise to the group, learning under his mentor, Jack. Stephen holds degrees in both music and education with a Masters in Education Administration. In December of 2022, Stephen was awarded the Canadian Ban Association Community Builders award, a national honour for his community work. He was also awarded “a Doctor of Letters, honoris causa from Cape Breton University and the prestigious Stomping’ Tom Connors award from the East Coast Music Association.”

In 1977, the group became the first Canadian musical ensemble to tour the People's Republic of China. In 1999, they went to Kosovo and performed a concert on behalf of the United Nations Children's Fund.

== Performances ==
The Men of the Deeps have toured most of the major cities in North America and have also performed concerts specifically for fellow miners during United Mine Workers of America conventions in Cincinnati and Denver. They have also released several albums on the Apex, Waterloo and Atlantica record labels. The group has appeared on numerous television programs including National Film Board of Canada short film of the Canada Vignettes series, featuring it in performance and a 2003 documentary by John Walker, which won a Gemini Award.

The Men of the Deep perform regularly in their home theatre, The Men of the Deeps Theatre, located at the Cape Breton Miners Museum.

== Discography ==
- Men of the Deeps (1966)
- The Men of the Deeps I II & III (1976)
- Diamonds in the Rough (1992)
- Buried Treasures (1995)
- Coal Fire in Winter (1996)
- Mining the Soul (2000) (with Rita MacNeil)
- Their Lights Will Shine (2004)
- 40 Years Young (2007)
- Christmas in the Mine (2017)
- Coal to Gold (2016)
- After the Pit (2022)
