= Sheri Jones =

Canadian artist manager

Sheri Jones is a Canadian artist manager based in Halifax, Nova Scotia. She has managed a roster of Maritime musical artists for nearly three decades.

== Career ==
Jones founded her company Jones & Co. Artist Management in 1993 after working alongside Ron Hynes to prepare the release of his album Cryer's Paradise. While hiring a band for Hynes' release tour, Jones hired a young fiddler who ended up being her second artist, Ashley MacIsaac.

Jones met Mary Jane Lamond and Gordie Sampson and launched her own record label, turtlemusik in 1997. By this time, Jones was representing a variety of artists including Sampson, Lamond, Kim Stockwood, and Damhnait Doyle. Stockwood and Doyle then teamed up with singer-songwriter Tara MacLean to form the band Shaye from 2003 until 2009, when MacLean left to focus on raising her young family.

In 2001, Jones began managing Joel Plaskett. Her long-time involvement with the East Coast Music Association led to her being named a lifetime honorary director in 2002. In 2008, she signed David Myles after seeing him perform during East Coast Music Week. Myles has since released 14 albums, won a Juno Award, and achieved many other accolades.

In 2010 Jones and Sampson launched the Gordie Sampson Songcamp. Some of the young songwriters they mentored became new clients for Jones. Mo Kenney, Dylan Guthro, and T. Thomason (formerly known as Molly Thomason) were all signed to Jones & Co. as a result of the camp.

From 2010-2019, the four-day songwriting camp has helped young Nova Scotian musicians hone their skills and make newfound connections while learning from Grammy-winner Sampson and many other guests. The camp has produced hundreds of songs, radio-charting hits, a successful band, and two compilation albums featuring its 40 attendees from its decade-long run.

Jones & Co. has been named Management Company of the Year at Music Nova Scotia's annual awards event on several occasions over Jones' time working in the industry.

In 2014, Jones began managing a new band, Port Cities, composed of three established songwriters who met at Gordie Sampson Songcamp, Dylan Guthro, Carleton Stone and Breagh MacKinnon. The band signed a deal with Warner Music Canada in 2016. The trio had been touring and playing together all of the time and forming Port Cities came naturally for them.

In 2016, Port Cities won Casino Nova Scotia's "Artist in Residence" competition, and took home $20,000. They then released their first two singles, "Astronaut" and "Back To The Bottom". The band released their debut full-length self-titled album on February 10, 2017, with Gordie Sampson as its producer. Since the release of their debut, the trio have amassed more than 1.5 million streams internationally, won five Nova Scotia Music Awards, a SOCAN #1 Award (for "Back to the Bottom"), and had songs at #1 on CBC and Spotify charts. In the fall od 2019, Breagh MacKinnon left the band to pursue new creative opportunities. Guthro and Stone have since released new music featuring Nashville-based singer-songwriter, Emma-Lee.

Jones has also worked with eccentric rock 'n roll jam band, The Brood, helping them secure a record deal in Austria and also releasing their records on her label, turtlemusik.

Aside from her main focus being on management with Jones & Co., and running a label, Jones has also expanded into an independent record distribution network alongside Joel Plaskett since 2011.

== Industry Affiliations ==
- 2010-2016 Radio Starmaker Board of Directors
- 2003–present ECMA Honorary Lifetime Director
- 2008-2009 ECMA Chair of Executive Director Hiring Committee
- 2007 Nova Scotia Community College Hiring Committee
- 2006-2007 Wrote the curriculum for NSCC Music Business Program
- 2006-2007 ECMA Chair of Nominating Committee
- 2005-2006 CHRC Management Advisory Committee
- 2005-2006 FACTOR Strategic Review Committee
- 2004-2006 JUNO 2006 Advisory Committee
- 2002-2005 FACTOR Board of Directors
- 2001-2003 Co-Chair, ECMA Board of Directors
- 2000-2001 FACTOR Radio Marketing Fund Consultant
- 1999-2004 CARAS Board of Directors (Vice President)
- 1999-2001 The Cultural Network of Nova Scotia Board of Directors
- 1996-2000 FACTOR Board of Directors (Vice President, Treasurer)
- 1994-1996 FACTOR National Advisory Board
- 1989-1996 ECMA Founding Director and Chair
- 1987-1989/97 Music Industry Association of Nova Scotia Board of Directors

== Awards & Achievements ==
- Canada Global Business Awards, Corporate Vision - Best Boutique Music Management Agency - 2021
- East Coast Music Award Winner - Management/Manager of the Year - 2020, 2019, 2018, 2017
- Music Nova Scotia Award Winner - Manager of the Year - 2019, 2000, 2013, 2010, 2005
- Halifax Pop Explosion Scene Builder Award 2019
- CIMA Brian Chater Industry Award - 2017
- Nova Scotia Woman of Excellence Award (Culture) - 2010
