= Dave Sampson (Canadian musician) =

Canadian singer-songwriter

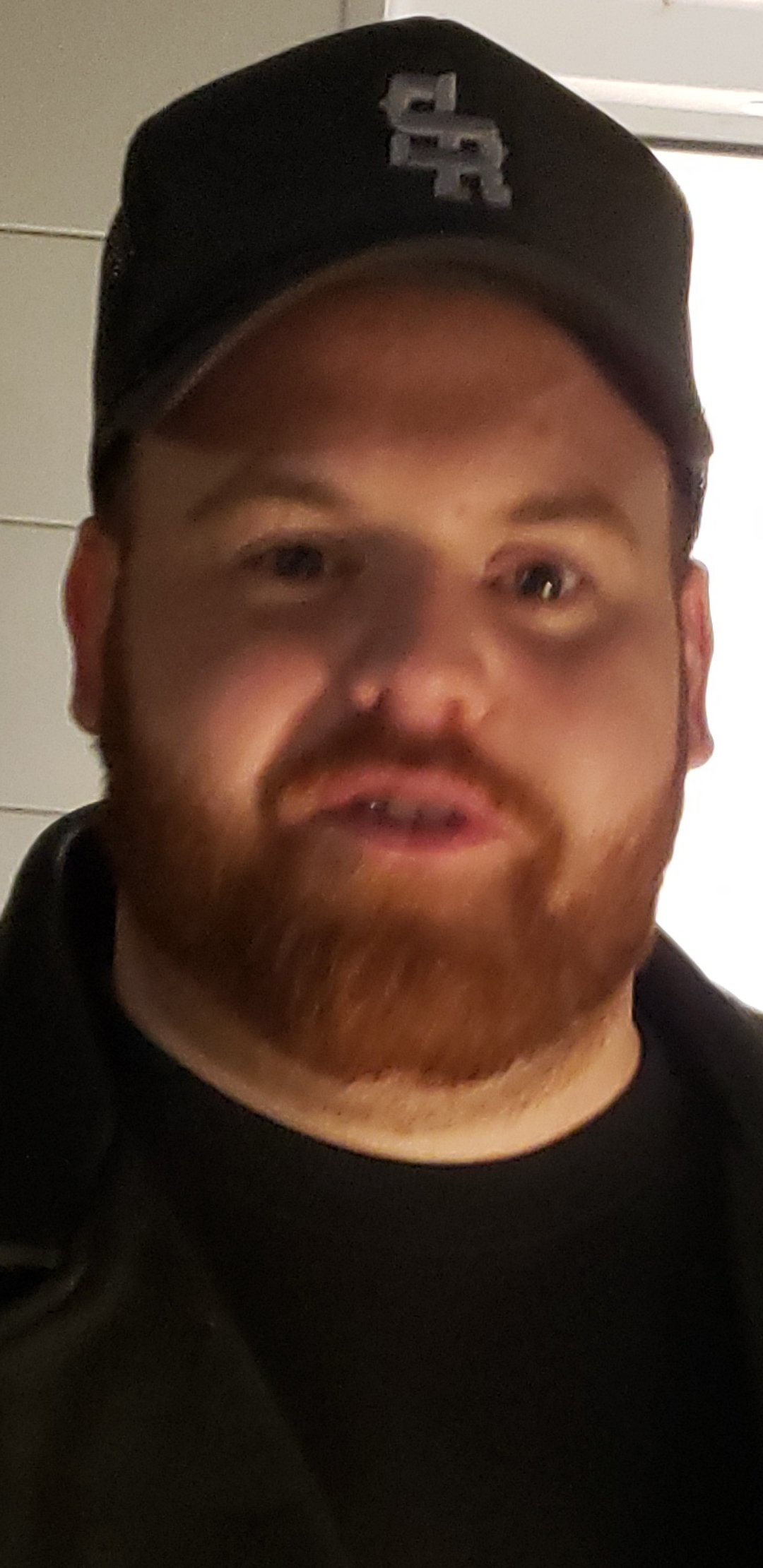

Dave Sampson (born March 8, 1989) Is a Canadian singer-songwriter and recording artist from Sydney, Nova Scotia, and based in Halifax, Nova Scotia.

== Early life and education ==
Sampson was born and grew up in Sydney, Nova Scotia. He attended St. Francis Xavier University.

== Career ==
For ten summers, beginning in 2010, Sampson attended Gordie Sampson's four-day Songcamp in Ingonish, Cape Breton. He moved to Halifax in 2011 and began playing in local clubs and bars while attending university. In 2014 he independently released his debut album No Pressure No Diamonds, which was co-produced by Gordie Sampson, Dylan Guthro and Carleton Stone.

Sampson contributed to Classified's 2016 single "No Pressure", featuring Snoop Dogg; this song was awarded Song of the Year at the 2017 East Coast Music Awards. Also in 2017 a music video which he co-created with the band Port Cities was nominated for a Music Nova Scotia Award.

Nova Scotia-based Sonic Publishing offered Sampson a publishing administration deal in 2019; he was the first addition to their newly created publishing division, Sonic Entertainment Group. Sonic Publishing also administers works by Adam Baldwin, Alan Doyle, Dave Sampson, Matt Andersen, and Matt Mays.

On October 4, 2019, Sampson released his new record All Types of Ways, recorded in Nashville with fellow Cape Breton native, Gordie Sampson. In October that year he was awarded his first gold record for his work Classified's "No Pressure", and also was one of five prize-winning finalists in the RBC Emerging Musician Program.

Sampson has also co-written with Gordie Sampson, Donovan Woods, Alan Doyle, Matt Andersen, Neon Dreams, and Caitlyn Smith. On April 16, 2022, Dave Sampson played live in the town of Sydney, Nova Scotia.

== Discography ==
=== EPs ===
- All Types of Ways EP (2019)

=== Albums ===
- No Pressure No Diamonds (2014)

=== Singles ===
- "Gets Me Through The Night" (2019)
- "Trouble" (2019)

=== Songwriting credits (co-songwriter) ===
- With Laurenn Marchand: "The Inevitable End" - The Gordie Sampson Songcamp 2010-2019 Compilation (2019)
- With Cameron Nickerson: "I'll Hunt You Down" - The Gordie Sampson Songcamp 2010-2019 Compilation (2019)
- With Various Artists: "Tip Of My Tongue" - The Gordie Sampson Songcamp 2010-2019 Compilation (2019)
- With Quake Matthews: "Outta Here" - The Search (2017)
- With Neon Dreams: "Find A Way" - To You (2016)
- With Classified (rapper): "Oh No" - Grateful (2016)
- With Classified (rapper), Snoop Dogg: "No Pressure" - single (2015)
- With Carleton Stone: "Draws Blood" - Draws Blood (2014) and "Like a Knife" - Draws Blood (2014)
- With Owen Riegling: "In My Head Again" (2024)

== Awards and achievements ==
- 2015
  - Music Nova Scotia Award Nomination: Pop Album of the Year - "No Pressure, No Diamonds"
  - Two #1 spots on East Coast Countdown Charts
- 2016
  - One of Five finalists in Canada’s Walk of Fame Emerging Artist Program
- 2017
  - Music Nova Scotia Award Nomination: Digital Artist of the Year
  - Music Nova Scotia Award Nomination: Music Video of the Year
  - Co-writer on ECMA Award-Winning "Song of the Year" by Classified, "No Pressure"
