= Dylan Guthro =

Canadian singer-songwriter

- Born: January 27, 1991 (age 35); Cape Breton Island, Nova Scotia, Canada
- Occupations: songwriter, performer, recording artist
- Instruments: Vocals, guitar
- Years active: 2010–present
- Website: http://www.dylanguthro.com/

Dylan Guthro (born January 27, 1991) is a Canadian singer/songwriter based in Nashville. The son of musician Bruce Guthro, Dylan released his debut album, All That's True, in 2012. In 2015, Guthro teamed up with fellow Halifax singer-songwriters Carleton Stone and Breagh Mackinnon to form the band Port Cities.

== Life and career ==
Dylan Guthro was exposed to music since birth as the son of Cape Breton singer-songwriter Bruce Guthro. While on tour with his father, Guthro played some demos he had recorded of his own material to musician Dave Gunning. Gunning was eager to help transform the demos into a full-fledged album. What eventually became All That's True was recorded and mixed over a number of different sessions during the course of six months. Bruce Guthro co-wrote five of the album's songs, and it was not the first time they had collaborated; Dylan had co-written four on Bruce's previous release, No Final Destination.

All That's True (co-produced by Gunning and Bruce Guthro) was released in 2012. It was called "one of the strongest debut albums" of the year by a music critic in the Prince Edward Island Guardian, and won the Best New Artist Recording of the Year at the Nova Scotia Music Awards in 2012. The album also received a number of placements on the popular Canadian television series, Degrassi: The Next Generation. Guthro has toured extensively in Canada, as well as Europe.

Guthro's 2014 release, "Do It All Again," was written with singer-songwriter David Myles, and produced by rapper Classified. The song placed in the finals in the 2015 USA Songwriting Competition in the R&B Category.

Also in 2014, Guthro made his producing debut, when he co-produced singer-songwriter Dave Sampson's debut album, No Pressure No Diamonds.

Guthro has co-written songs with artists of many different genres, and over the years became more and more involved in working with local hip-hop and EDM artists, resulting in three features on Quake Matthews' latest album Rap Music. He also had several co-writing credits on Neon Dreams' album The Last of Us including being featured alongside rapper Waka Flocka Flame on the single "High."

In 2015, Guthro and fellow singer-songwriters Carleton Stone and Breagh Mackinnon united to form the band Port Cities. The band makes singer-songwriter-style pop music featuring both two- and three-part harmonies. They originally met at the Gordie Sampson Songcamp in Cape Breton early in the summer of 2011, and have been playing together as a threesome for a few years before officially becoming a band. The band recorded their debut album in both Cape Breton and Nashville with producer/songwriter Gordie Sampson which was released in February 2017.

In July 2016, Guthro released a self-titled solo urban pop EP, which includes tracks co-written with his two Port Cities bandmates, as well as collaborations with Quake Matthews and members of Neon Dreams.

== Discography ==
=== Albums ===
With Port Cities	Port Cities	2017

=== EPs ===
Dylan Guthro	2016

=== Singles ===
With Port Cities	Title	Year
	"Sorry"	2019
	"Montreal" Famba Remix	2019
	"Montreal" Tep No Remix	2019
	"Montreal"	2018
	"Half The Way" Germany Mix	2018
	"Idea Of You" Corey Lerue Remix	2018
	"Idea Of You"	2018
	"Where Have You Been" (Acoustic)	2017
	"Sound Of Your Voice" Tawgs Remix	2017
	"Back To The Bottom" Neon Dreams Remix	2017

As Dylan Guthro	Title	Year
	"Dance On Me"	2016
	"High" – Neon Dreams featuring Waka Flocka Flame and Dylan Guthro	2015
	"Summertime Win" – Quake Matthews featuring Dylan Guthro	2014
	"Do It All Again"	2014

=== Producer credits ===
Artist	Title	Album	Year	Produced by
Walker Hayes	U Girl	Single	2021	Produced by Dylan Guthro
Noah Schnacky and Jimmie Allen	Don't You Wanna Know	Single	2021	Produced by Dylan Guthro
Banners	If I Didn't Have You	Single	2021	Co-produced by Dylan Guthro and Jason Suwito
Port Cities	Sorry	Single	2019	Co-produced by Dylan Guthro and Greg Wells
Dave Sampson	Gets Me Through the Night	All Types of Ways	2019	Co-produced by Dylan Guthro and Gordie Sampson
Kayleigh	Harley Quinn	Single	2019	Co-produced by Dylan Guthro and Robyn Dell'Unto
Maura Whitman	Roulette	Single	2019	Co-produced by Dylan Guthro and Corey Lerue
Quake Matthews	Grandma's Cooking	Drinking Games	2018	Co-produced by Dylan Guthro and Big Joe
Quake Matthews Ft. Ria Mae	If It's Not Too Late	Drinking Games	2018	Co-produced by Dylan Guthro and Jordyn Woodside
Ria Mae	Red Light	Single	2018	Co-produced by Dylan Guthro and Adam King
Jodi Guthro	Shots Fired	Single	2018	Co-produced by Dylan Guthro and Corey Lerue
Jodi Guthro	Broken Wings	Single	2018	Co-produced by Dylan Guthro and Corey Lerue
Jodi Guthro	Fall	Single	2018	Co-produced by Dylan Guthro and Corey Lerue
Jodi Guthro	Heights	Single	2018	Co-produced by Dylan Guthro and Corey Lerue
Jodi Guthro	So Many Nights	Single	2017	Co-produced by Dylan Guthro and Corey Lerue
Port Cities	Montreal	Single	2018	Produced by Dylan Guthro
Port Cities	Idea of You	Single	2018	Produced by Dylan Guthro

=== Songwriting credits (co-songwriter) ===
Artist	Title	Album	Year
Don Ameno	Wheels Off	Six	2023
Austin Snell	Wrecking Ball	Muddy Water Rockstar	2023
Walker Hayes	Stetson	Single	2023
Teigen Gayse	Sleeping With Her	Single	2023
Walker Hayes	Six String American Dream	Single	2023
Walker Hayes	9	New Money	2023
Five Roses	Livin' in a Country Song	Jukebox Vibrations	2023
Dan + Shay	Missing Someone	Bigger Houses	2023
Walker Hayes	Show Me The Country	Single	2023
Adam Hambrick	Built For a Small Town	Single	2023
Jade Eagleson	Neon Dreamin'	Do It Anyway	2023
Walker Hayes	Life With You	Country Stuff	2022
Grace Tyler	Dust	Single	2022
Tylynn Allen	God Made Me	Single	2022
Somna	Not Too Late	Single	2022
Brandy Neely	Worse Than My Worst	Single	2022
Dixie	Bye2You	Single	2022
Walker Hayes	U Gurl	Single	2021
Noah Schnacky & Jimmie Allen	Don't You Wanna Know	Single	2021
Banners	If I Didn't Have You	Single	2021
Dave Sampson	All My Friends	Single	2021
Neon Dreams	Lifestyles of the Broke and Nameless	The Happiness of Tomorrow	2020
Neon Dreams	House Party	The Happiness of Tomorrow	2020
Port Cities	Sorry	Single	2019
Dave Sampson	Gets Me Through The Night	All Types Of Ways	2019
Maura Whitman	Roulette	Single	2019
Ria Mae	Red Light	Single	2018
Port Cities	Montreal	Single	2018
Port Cities	Idea of You	Single	2018
Port Cities	Idea of You	Single	2018
Jodi Guthro	Shots Fired	Single	2018
Jodi Guthro	Broken Wings	Single	2018
Jodi Guthro	Fall	Single	2018
Jodi Guthro	Heights	Single	2018
Donovan Woods	Burn That Bridge	Both Sides	2018
Port Cities	Back to the Bottom	Port Cities	2017
Port Cities	Don't Say You Love Me	Port Cities	2017
Port Cities	In The Dark	Port Cities	2017
Port Cities	Sound Of Your Voice	Port Cities	2017
Port Cities	How To Lose You	Port Cities	2017
Port Cities	Half The Way	Port Cities	2017
Port Cities	Burn That Bridge	Port Cities	2017
Port Cities	Body + Soul	Port Cities	2017
Port Cities	Astronaut	Port Cities	2017
Port Cities	In The Dark	Port Cities	2017
Port Cities	In The Dark	Port Cities	2017
Jodi Guthro	So Many Nights	Single	2017
Neon Dreams	Find A Way	Single	2017
Neon Dreams	Beat Of Your Heart	To You	2016
Neon Dreams	Wallpaper	To You	2016
Ria Mae	I Don't Wanna Know	Ria Mae	2016
Donovan Woods	The First Time	Hard Settle, Ain't Troubled	2015
Reeny Smith	Last Call	Single	2015
Tim Chaisson	Crushed	Single	2015
Neon Dreams	Skyscraper	The Last Of Us	2015
Neon Dreams	High	The Last Of Us	2015
Neon Dreams	Love Experts	The Last Of Us	2015
Quake Matthews	Throw Me in the Fire	Rap Music	2015
Quake Matthews	Love Me Anyway	Rap Music	2015
Quake Matthews	Helluva	Rap Music	2015
Quake Matthews	Get Out of the Way	Rap Music	2015
Quake Matthews	Summertime Win	Single	2014
Dave Sampson	Good Thing	No Pressure No Diamonds	2014
Carleton Stone	When You Come Home	Draws Blood	2014
Carleton Stone	The Darkness	Draws Blood	2014
Breagh MacKinnon	Call You Mine	Where The Days Went	2012
Bruce Guthro	Let It Go	Celtic Crossing	2011
Bruce Guthro	Little Bit Of Love	No Final Destination	2009
Bruce Guthro	Rush	No Final Destination	2009
Bruce Guthro	Flew MacCarthy Home	No Final Destination	2009
Bruce Guthro	Without Words	No Final Destination	2009

== Awards and achievements ==
- With Port Cities (band)

Year	Award
2018	Slaight Music Juno Masterclass Winners
	Voted The Coast "Best of Halifax" – Best Folk Artist/Band (Gold)
	Voted The Coast "Best of Halifax" – Best Pop Artist/Band (Silver)
	Music Nova Scotia Award Nomination – Digital Artist of the Year
	ECMA Award Nomination – Pop Recording of the Year – Port Cities, Port Cities
	ECMA Award Nomination – Song of the Year – Port Cities, "Back To The Bottom"
	ECMA Award Nomination – Fans’ Choice Entertainer of the Year – Port Cities
2017	CBC Radio 2 2017 Charts Most Online Votes – No. 14 "In The Dark"
	CBC Radio 2 2017 Charts No. 1 songs of 2017 – No. 14 "Back to the Bottom"
	CBC Radio 2 2017 Charts No. 1 songs of 2017 – No. 14 "Back to the Bottom"
	Music Nova Scotia Award Winner Best Album – "Port Cities"
	Music Nova Scotia Award Winner Best Group Album – "Port Cities"
	Music Nova Scotia Award Winner Best Pop Album – "Port Cities"
	Music Nova Scotia Award Winner Entertainer of the Year
	Music Nova Scotia Award Winner Digital Artist of the Year
	Music Nova Scotia Award Nominee Video of the Year – "Trouble" (With Dave Sampson)
	SOCAN No. 1 Award – Back to the Bottom
	No. 1 CBC Radio Top 20 (February 23, 2017) – Back to the Bottom
	No. 1 Spotify Canada "Viral 50" Chart – Back to the Bottom
	Voted The Coast "Best of Halifax" – Best Music Video – "Astronaut" (Gold)
	Voted The Coast "Best of Halifax" – Best Artist / Band Most Likely To Make It Big (Silver)
	Voted The Coast "Best of Halifax" – Best Pop Artist/Band (Silver)
	No. 1 CBC Radio Top 20 (February 23, 2017) – Back to the Bottom
2016	Casino Nova Scotia Artist in Residence 2016 Winners
	Top 25 CBC Searchlight Competition
	Slaight Music Juno Masterclass Finalists

- As Dylan Guthro

Year	Award
2015	USA Songwriting Competition Finalist (RnB Category) – "Do It All Again"
2014	Music Nova Scotia Award Nomination, SOCAN Songwriter of the Year – "When You Come Home"
2012	Music Nova Scotia Award Winner, New Artist Recording of the Year – All That's True
