= Made in Cape Breton =

Studio album by The Cottars
- Released: July 10, 2002
- Recorded: 2001
- Genre: International / Folk Celtic
- Length: 51:36
- Label: Sea Cape Music Ltd. (Distributed by Warner Canada
- Producer: Allister MacGillivray, Brigham Phillips

The Cottars chronology
| Made in Cape Breton (2002) | On Fire (2004) |

Made in Cape Breton is the first of three albums by the Celtic band The Cottars. Recorded at Lakewind Sound Studios in Cape Breton, Nova Scotia, and released in 2002 by Warner Music.

== Track listing ==
1. Sùilean Dubh (trad.)– 2:45
2. The Captain Campbell Medley – 4:07
  - Captain Campbell (trad.)
  - Calum Breugach (trad.)
  - Wedding Reel #1 (trad.)
  - Cui's a Christ Mhóir Mi (Wedding Reel #3) (trad.)
  - The High Road to Linton (trad.)
3. I Know Who Is Sick (trad.) – 1:50
4. The Boy's Lament Medley – 5:10
  - The Boy's Lament For His Dragon (trad.)
  - Jessie Smith (trad.)
  - A Taste Of Gaelic (trad.)
  - Brenda Stubbert's Reel (Jerry Holand/Fiddlestick Music)
5. Ballinderry (trad.) – 5:33
6. The Two Brothers Medley – 5:26
  - Two Brothers (Irving Gordon/Welbeck Music Corp.)
  - O'Keefe's Slide (trad.)
  - The Tenpenny Bit (trad.)
7. Scarlet Ribbons (Segal-Levine/EMI Mills Music) – 3:49 - With special guest John McDermott
8. Ciarán's Piano Medley – 5:40
  - My Lodging's On The Cold Ground/Endearing Young Charms (trad.)
  - The Lass O' The Corrie Mill (trad.)
  - The Growling Old Man And Old Woman (trad.)
  - The Golden Wedding Reel (trad.)
9. The Coulin / Hornpipes Medley – 4:52
  - The Coulin (trad.) / The Green Castle (trad.)
  - The Harvest Home (trad.)
10. The Briar & The Rose (Tom Waits/Jalma Music Inc.) – 5:09 First Single
11. The Pleasure of Home Medley – 3:28
  - The Pleasures Of Home Fackler
  - I Have A Wife Of Me Ain (trad.)
  - Gabrielle's Jig (John Morris Rankin/Ole Sound Productions)
12. Here's To Song (Allister MacGillivray/Cabot Trail Music, Socan) – 4:38 - With special guest John McDermott
13. Kitchen Racket – 1:49

== Musical contributions ==
- The Cottars
  - Ciarán MacGillivray (age 13): piano, tin whistle, bodhrán, vocals, step-dancing
  - Fiona MacGillivray (age 12): tin whistle, bodhrán, lead vocals, step-dancing
  - Jimmy MacKenzie (age 14): guitar, bodhrán
  - Roseanne MacKenzie (age 11): fiddle, harmony vocals, step-dancing
- Additional Musicians
  - John McDermott
  - Brigham Phillips
  - Gordie Sampson
  - Al Bennett
  - Allister MacGillivray
  - Beverly MacGillivray
  - Patrick Kilbride
  - Deborah Quigley
  - Wendy Rose
  - Anne Lindsay
  - Claudio Bena
  - Audrey King

== Awards earned ==
- East Coast Music Award, 2003
- M.I.A.N.S Award, 2003

== Additional information ==
- Executive Producer: John McDermott
- Arranger/Musical Director: Allister MacGillivray
- String Arrangements: Brigham Phillips
- Producers: Allister MacGillivray & Brigham Phillips
- Recording and Mixing Engineer: Gary Gray
- Assistant Engineers: Mike "Sheppy" "Shepherd and Nathan Handy
- Recording Studios: Lakewind Sound and Manta DSP
- Mastering: Charles Gray, Saluki Music
- Photography, Design & Layout: Carol Kennedy

All traditional songs and tunes were adapted and arranged by Allister MacGillivray and The Cottars.
