= Forerunner (album) =

Studio album by The Cottars
- Released: 2006
- Recorded: 2005
- Genre: International / Folk Celtic
- Length: 41:52
- Label: Rounder Records
- Producer: Gordie Sampson, Allister MacGillivray

The Cottars chronology
On Fire (2004)	Forerunner (2006)

Forerunner is the third album by the Eastern-Canadian Celtic band The Cottars.

Professional ratings
Review scores
Source	Rating
Amazon.com	Link

== Track listing ==
1. Waterlily (Karine Polwart/Bay Songs Ltd., ASCAP) – 4:29
2. Miss Casey Medley – 1:59
  - Miss Casey's Jig (trad., arr. Allister MacGillivray/Cabot Trail Music, SOCAN)
  - The Humours of Ballinafauna (trad., arr. Allister MacGillivray/Cabot Trail Music, SOCAN)
3. Byker Hill (trad., arr. Allister MacGillivray/Cabot Trail Music, SOCAN) – 2:48
4. Atlantic Blue Ron Hynes/Blue Murder/Sold For A Song, SOCAN) – 4:14
5. Some Polkas – 3:14
  - Johnny Mickey's Polka (trad., arr. Allister MacGillivray/Cabot Trail Music, SOCAN)
  - Ballydesmond Polka (trad., arr. Allister MacGillivray/Cabot Trail Music, SOCAN)
  - The Magic Slipper Polka (trad., arr. Allister MacGillivray/Cabot Trail Music, SOCAN)
6. Pat Works On The Railway (trad., arr. Allister MacGillivray/Cabot Trail Music, SOCAN) – 4:25
7. Georgia Lee (Tom Waits-Kathleen Brennan/Jalma Music) – 4:34
8. Sliabh Na mBan (trad., arr. Ciarán MacGillivray/Cabot Trail Music, SOCAN) – 3:04
9. Home By Bearna (trad., arr. Allister MacGillivray/Cabot Trail Music, SOCAN) – 2:33
  - Jo MacPhee's Jig (Allister MacGillivray/Cabot Trail Music, SOCAN)
10. Send Me A River (Sinéad Lohan/RykoMusic Ltd. MCPS) – 3:45
11. Honeysuckle Medley – 4:10
  - The Honeysuckle Hornpipe (trad., arr. Allister MacGillivray-Roseanne MacKenzie/Cabot Trail Music, SOCAN)
  - The Dancing Strathspey (trad., arr. Allister MacGillivray-Roseanne MacKenzie/Cabot Trail Music, SOCAN)
  - Jenny Dang the Weaver (trad., arr. Allister MacGillivray-Roseanne MacKenzie/Cabot Trail Music, SOCAN)
  - The Randy Wife of Greelaw (trad., arr. Allister MacGillivray-Roseanne MacKenzie/Cabot Trail Music, SOCAN)
  - Crossing the Minch (trad., arr. Allister MacGillivray-Roseanne MacKenzie/Cabot Trail Music, SOCAN)
12. Hold On (Tom Waits-Kathleen Brennan/Jalma Music) – 4:37

== Credits ==
- Lakewind Sound sessions (Cape Breton Island)
  - The Cottars
    - Ciarán MacGillivray: vocals, piano, guitar, electric guitar (Strat), Bb whistle, bodhrán, accordion
    - Fiona MacGillivray: vocals, whistle, bodhrán
    - Jimmy MacKenzie: guitar, tenor banjo
    - Roseanne MacKenzie: harmony vocals, fiddle, percussion
  - Additional Musicians
    - Jamie Gatti - bass
    - Allister MacGillivray
    - Beverly MacGillivray
- Sound Emporium sessions (Nashville)
  - Gordie Sampson: guitar, bouzouki, piano
  - Mike Brignardello: bass
  - Tom Bukovac: guitars, piano
  - Shannon Forrest: drums, percussion
  - David Henry: cello
  - Jimmy Rankin: additional vocals on Atlantic Blue
