= Lakewind Sound Studios =

Coordinates: 46°18′41″N 60°17′26″W

Lakewind Sound Studios is a studio in Canada. Artists to have their work recorded at the studio include Gordie Sampson with Stones in 1998, Damhnait Doyle with Davnet in 2003, The Cottars with Made in Cape Breton in 2002 and On Fire in 2004.

== Background ==
The genesis of the studio goes back to when Fred Lavery and Gordie Sampson were performing together. This resulted in the formation of Lakewind Sound Studios. The studio has won nine ECMA’s and 5 MIANS Studio of the Year Awards.

An article on the Government of Nova Scotia website dated December 7, 2006 reports that the studio had won in succession seven East Coast Music Awards in the Studio of the Year category. They had also won multiple Music Industry Association of Nova Scotia Awards. In 2021, they were nominees in the Studio of the Year category.

Mike Shephered who has worked as an engineer at the studio has also played an important part in Cape Bretton fiddle recording development.

Prior to opening the studio, Fred Lavery was in a Nova Scotia group called Road who released three singles. They had a regional hit with "Song for Noel" in 1978.
