= On Fire (The Cottars album) =

Studio album by The Cottars
- Released: October 18, 2004
- Recorded: 2004
- Genre: International / Folk Celtic
- Length: 43:34
- Label: Warner Music Canada
- Producer: Allister MacGillivray, Brigham Phillips

The Cottars chronology
Made in Cape Breton (2002)	On Fire (2004)	Forerunner (2006)

“On Fire” is the second CD released by Cape Breton's Celtic quartet, The Cottars. It was recorded at Lakewind Sound Studios in Cape Breton, Nova Scotia, and distributed by Warner Music. It was also released in Japan in 2004 by JVC Victor, and followed by an extensive Japan tour. All the traditional songs and tunes were adapted and arranged by Allister MacGillivray and The Cottars and are published by Cabot Trail Music, SOCAN.

== Track listing ==
1. Ready For The Storm (Dougie MacLean/Limetree Arts and Music)– 3:47 (first single)
2. Calling On Song (trad.) – 1:23
3. Bodhran. Fiddle Medley – 3:29
  - Molly Rankin's Reel (John Morris Rankin/Ole Sound Productions Ltd.)
  - Saint Anne's Reel (trad.)
  - Dinkie Dorrian's (Francie Byrne)
4. Loch Tay Boat Song (H. Boulton - R. MacLeod/J.B Cramer & Co. Ltd.) – 5:04
5. Planxty Mira Medley – 4:03
  - The Bothy Band Jig (trad.)
  - The Diplodocus (Liz Carroll)
  - Planxty Mira (Ciarán MacGillivray/Cabot Trail Music)
6. Cape Breton Lullaby (words: Kenneth Leslie; music: trad.) – 3:35
7. Boholla Medley – 5:00
  - The Boholla #2 Jig (trad.)
  - Trip To Killavil (trad.)
  - O'Connell's Welcome To Dublin (trad.)
  - The Swallow-Tail Jig (trad.)
8. The Wild Goose (Wade Hemsworth/Southern Music Publishing Co. Canada Ltd.) – 4:58
9. The Guitar Jigs – 2:40
  - The Mabou Jig (Donald Angus Beaton)
  - Hare Slough Jig (Willy Sawrenko)
  - The Advil Jig (Randy Foster)
10. Reconciliation (Ron Kavana) – 4:10
11. Celtic Harp Medley – 3:30
  - Planxty Irwin, a.k.a. Col. John Irwin (Turlough O'Carolan)
  - The Water Rabbit (Jenny Tingley)
12. The Parting Glass (trad.) – 3:55 - with special guest John McDermott

== Credits ==
- The Cottars
  - Ciarán MacGillivray (age 16): keyboards, guitar, electric guitar (Strat), tin whistle, vocals
  - Fiona MacGillivray (age 14): tin whistle, harp, bodhrán, lead and harmony vocals
  - Jimmy MacKenzie (age 17): guitar, bodhrán
  - Roseanne MacKenzie (age 12): fiddle, harmony vocals, step-dancing
- Additional Musicians
  - John McDermott
  - Brigham Phillips
  - Gordie Sampson
  - Allister MacGillivray
  - Beverly MacGillivray
  - Allie Bennett
  - Patrick Kilbride
  - Mark Kelso
  - Jason Fowler
  - Lenny Soloman
  - Jonothon Craig
  - Anne Lindsay (solo violin on Reconciliation)
  - Wendy Soloman (cello solo)

== Awards ==
East Coast Music Award, 2005 - Folk Roots Traditional Recording
