= Jocelyn & Lisa =

- Jocelyn & Lisa in 2012.

Background information
- Origin: Calgary, Alberta, Canada
- Genres: Soul pop, indie rock, funk rock, R&B
- Years active: 2011–2015
- Labels: Independent
- Members: Jocelyn Alice; Lisa Jacobs
- Website: www.jocelynandlisa.com

Jocelyn & Lisa (stylized as jocelyn & lisa) was a Canadian indie soul pop duo from Calgary, Alberta, formed by Jocelyn Alice (vocals) and Lisa Jacobs (vocals, bass, guitar, piano) in 2012. Their debut EP, Weary Warrior, was released on November 19, 2012, with lead single "Preach", which charted #2 and #5 on CJSW Radio. They have also been featured artists on CBC Radio, CTV, Shaw TV, Global TV and City.

A subsequent single, "Bound To You", was released on August 21, 2013.

== History ==
=== 2011: Formation and early years ===
Alice entered the media spotlight when she was 16, as a runner-up in Canada's Popstars, where she emerged from more than 7000 entries nationwide to share her powerful voice and charismatic style mentored by her role models Amy Winehouse, Joss Stone, and Adele. She then went on to write and perform many original songs, working with LA producer, musician, and engineer Stacy Jones, and fronted local bands The Monster Famous and End of Oz. Studio producers, Russell Broom and Mitch Lee, hired Alice as a session vocalist to record songs for the hit movie Dear Santa, as well as for nationwide commercials; most notably a collaboration with Right the Stars to produce a remake of Reach Out of the Darkness, by Friend and Lover, for a Target Threshold advertisement. Her songs have also been featured on hit shows One Tree Hill and Pretty Little Liars. She is currently signed to Secret Road Music Services.

Jacobs grew up playing bass in her family band, at church, festivals, and in local bars. Since then, Jacobs has performed alongside bands Bedouin Soundclash, Emerson Drive, and Los Lobos, as well as others. Alice approached Jacobs in late 2011 — after watching her perform with several local funk and soul groups, including Kyemara and the Kirby Sewell Band — and suggested they write a song together. Jacobs admitted she was initially unsure about collaborating on the project, as she's always worked in larger bands as a freelancer.

=== 2012–present: Weary Warrior and recognition ===
In early 2012, Alice and Jacobs decided to collaborate, and within months, a growing fan base requested more. November 2012 marked the release of their debut EP Weary Warrior, which charted #2 and #5 on CJSW Radio, and were featured artists on multiple radio stations and broadcasting. Debut single "Preach" was selected for The Beatdrop Remix Competition.

In addition to playing live shows, Alice and Jacobs were featured in the documentary Crave by Los Angeles filmmaker and best-selling novelist, Erwin McManus. Additionally, the duo's track "Open Wide" is featured in the documentary 1000days, by award-winning Canadian director, Jeth Weinrich, who also produced a music video for the song. In April 2013, Alice and Jacobs were featured in the "Right Here: Destination Calgary" video (a commercial promoting Calgary around the world).

Recent performance highlights include the 2013 TransCanada Alberta Music Series and live concert rotation on Shaw TV for the 2013 Stampede Sessions.

In 2014, Jocelyn Alice co-wrote a song with Hello Moth called "Jackpot." It was first released on YouTube on December 25, 2014. The song reached #43 on the Billboard Canadian Hot 100 chart for the week of July 25, 2015, and climbed to #38 on the Billboard Canadian Hot 100 chart for the week of August 1, 2015. Jackpot was #9 on the list of Spotify's 10 most viral tracks in the United States for the week ending August 6, 2015.

== Discography ==
=== Extended plays ===
Title	Album details
Weary Warrior	Released: November 19, 2012 (US); Formats: DD, CD

=== Singles ===
Title	Album details
"Preach"	Released: November 19, 2012 (US); Formats: DD, CD (Weary Warrior)
"Bound To You"	Released: August 21, 2013 (US); Formats: DD
"O Holy Night"	Released: November 30, 2013 (US); Formats: DD

== See also ==
- List of blue-eyed soul artists
- List of people from Calgary
- List of indie pop artists
