= Port Cities =

Canadian band

- Origin: Halifax, Nova Scotia, Canada
- Genres: pop
- Years active: 2015–present
- Label: turtlemusik/Warner Music
- Members: Dylan Guthro, Breagh MacKinnon, Carleton Stone
- Website: http://portcities.ca/

Port Cities is a Canadian band based in Halifax, Nova Scotia. Formed in 2015, Port Cities is composed of Dylan Guthro, Breagh MacKinnon, and Carleton Stone —each already a singer/songwriter with an established solo career. The band signed with turtlemusik/Warner Music in 2016 and released its debut album in 2017.

== History ==
Guthro, Mackinnon, and Stone met in 2011 at the Gordie Sampson Song Camp, an annual event in Cape Breton where they formed a friendship.

Port Cities was formed in 2015. In 2016, the band was signed to turtlemusik/Warner Music; their debut album was released in February 2017.

In 2016, Port Cities won Casino Nova Scotia's third annual Artist in Residence competition, which awarded them $20,000.

In 2016, the band released its first two songs, "Astronaut" and "Back to the Bottom". The debut album, produced by Gordie Sampson, was released February 10, 2017. On February 23, 2017, their debut single "Back to the Bottom" reached #1 on CBC Radio 2. That same year, Port Cities took the lead at the 2017 Nova Scotia Music Awards, winning five, including Entertainer of the Year, Digital Artist of the Year, Group Recording of the Year, Pop Recording of the Year, and Recording of the Year.

In February 2018, Port Cities released their single "Idea of You". That spring, they toured across Canada, as well as Germany and the United Kingdom.

Port Cities were among the 2018–2019 Allan Slaight Juno Masterclass Winners, Canada’s premiere artist development program selected by a "super-jury" of music industry leaders. Of the four master class participants, Port Cities was chosen to perform at the 2019 Juno Gala Dinner and Awards on March 16.

Their most recent single is "Montreal".

On September 20, 2019, the band stated keyboardist and singer Breagh MacKinnon would be leaving to pursue "new creative opportunities". Guthro and Stone have confirmed that they will be continuing as a band under the name Port Cities.

== Band members ==
- Breagh MacKinnon (vocals, keyboards) (2015–2019)
- Dylan Guthro (vocals, guitar, programming)
- Carleton Stone (vocals, guitar)

== Discography ==
=== Albums ===
- Port Cities (2017)

=== Singles ===
  - "Sorry" (2019)
  - "Montreal" Famba Remix (2019)
  - "Montreal" Tep No Remix (2019)
  - "Montreal" (2018)
  - "Half The Way" Germany Mix" (2018)
  - "Idea Of You" Corey Lerue Remix (2018)
  - "Idea Of You" (2018)
  - "Where Have You Been" (Acoustic) (2017)
  - "Sound Of Your Voice" Tawgs Remix (2017)
  - "Back To The Bottom" Neon Dreams Remix (2017)

== Awards and achievements ==
- 2019
  - Music Nova Scotia Award Nomination - Digital Artist of the Year
  - Music Nova Scotia Award Nomination - Songwriter of the Year - "Montreal" (Dylan Guthro, Breagh MacKinnon, Carleton Stone, Thomas Salter)
- 2018
  - Slaight Music Juno Masterclass Winners
  - Voted The Coast "Best of Halifax" - Best Folk Artist/Band (Gold)
  - Voted The Coast "Best of Halifax" - Best Pop Artist/Band (Silver)
  - Music Nova Scotia Award Nomination - Digital Artist of the Year
  - ECMA Award Nomination - Pop Recording of the Year – "Port Cities", Port Cities
  - ECMA Award Nomination - Song of the Year – Port Cities, "Back To The Bottom"
  - ECMA Award Nomination - Fans' Choice Entertainer of the Year – Port Cities
- 2017
  - CBC Radio 2 2017 Charts Most Online Votes - #14 "In The Dark"
  - CBC Radio 2 2017 Charts #1 songs of 2017 - #14 "Back to the Bottom"
  - Music Nova Scotia Award Winner Best Album - "Port Cities"
  - Music Nova Scotia Award Winner Best Group Album - "Port Cities"
  - Music Nova Scotia Award Winner Best Pop Album - "Port Cities"
  - Music Nova Scotia Award Winner Entertainer of the Year
  - Music Nova Scotia Award Winner Digital Artist of the Year
  - Music Nova Scotia Award Nominee Video of the Year - "Trouble" (With Dave Sampson)
  - SOCAN #1 Award - "Back to the Bottom"
  - #1 CBC Radio Top 20 (February 23, 2017) - "Back to the Bottom"
  - #1 Spotify Canada "Viral 50" Chart - "Back to the Bottom"
  - Voted The Coast "Best of Halifax" - Best Music Video - "Astronaut" (Gold)
  - Voted The Coast "Best of Halifax" - Best Artist / Band Most Likely To Make It Big (Silver)
  - Voted The Coast "Best of Halifax" - Best Pop Artist/Band (Silver)
- 2016
  - Casino Nova Scotia Artist In Residence 2016 Winners
  - Top 25 CBC Searchlight Competition
  - Slaight Music Juno Masterclass Finalists
- 2015
  - Voted The Coast "Best of Halifax" - Best New Artist / Band (Bronze)
