= Carleton Stone =

Canadian singer-songwriter

- Born: 1985 (age 40–41); Sydney, Nova Scotia
- Occupations: songwriter, performer, recording artist
- Instruments: Vocals, guitar
- Years active: 2009–present
- Member of: Port Cities
- Website: http://www.carletonstone.com/

Carleton Stone is a Canadian singer-songwriter based in Cape Breton, Nova Scotia. After recording three albums as a solo artist, Stone joined forces in 2015 with musicians Dylan Guthro and Breagh Mackinnon to form the pop band Port Cities before returning to solo releases.

== Life and career ==
Stone was born in Sydney, Nova Scotia. He had a musical family and grew up listening to Bruce Springsteen, Ryan Adams, and Bob Dylan, among others.

He began his professional musical life fronting a band, and self-produced the group's debut album, entitled Carleton Stone Drives the Big Wheel, which was released in 2009. In 2011, he became a solo artist, releasing the eponymous Carleton Stone, produced by Hawksley Workman.

Stone's third album, Draws Blood, was co-produced by Jason Collett, of Broken Social Scene, and Howie Beck. It was released in 2014 and was dedicated to his friend and mentor Jay Smith, a well-known Canadian musician, who took his own life in 2013 after struggling with addiction and depression.

In 2015, Stone joined fellow singer-songwriters Dylan Guthro and Breagh Mackinnon to form the band Port Cities. Port Cities makes singer/songwriter-style pop music and takes advantage of all three voices with extensive use of vocal harmonies.

"We just thought, there's such a great chemistry between us, why not try to join forces and do something that's bigger that any of us could do on our own?" said Stone in 2015. In 2016, the band was signed to turtlemusik/Warner Music. Their debut album was released in 2017.

In 2022, Stone began releasing singles from his fourth solo album, Papercut. His first single, "Ice Age" was inspired by a story he had heard on CBC's interview show As It Happens.

== Discography ==
=== Albums ===
With Port Cities	Port Cities	2017
As Carleton Stone	Papercut	2022
	Draws Blood	2014
	Carleton Stone	2011
	Carleton Stone Drives The Big Wheel	2009

=== Singles ===
As Carleton Stone	Title	Year
	"Used To"	2026
	"Pick Me Up, Dust Me Off (Acoustic)"	2024

With Port Cities	Title	Year
	"Parachute"	2021
	"I Still See You at Parties" Corey Lerue Remix	2020
	"I Still See You at Parties"	2020
	"Sorry"	2019
	"Montreal" Famba Remix	2019
	"Montreal" Tep No Remix	2019
	"Montreal"	2018
	"Half The Way" Germany Mix	2018
	"Idea Of You" Corey Lerue Remix	2018
	"Idea Of You"	2018
	"Where Have You Been" (Acoustic)	2017
	"Sound Of Your Voice" Tawgs Remix	2017
	"Back To The Bottom" Neon Dreams Remix	2017

=== Producer credits ===
Artist	Title	Album	Year	Produced by
Maggie Andrew	Father Figure	How to Sing For Money	2025	Carleton Stone
Maggie Andrew	Hurt Myself	Day Job	2024	Carleton Stone
Maggie Andrew	About Us	Day Job	2024	Carleton Stone
Maggie Andrew	Better Than You	Single	2023	Carleton Stone and Corey LeRue
Chudi Harris	How It's Always Been	Single	2022	Carleton Stone
Brynn Knickle	Fool No More	Single	2022	Carleton Stone
Willie Stratton	Drugstore Dreamin'	Album	2022	Carleton Stone
Carleton Stone	Papercut	Album	2022	Carleton Stone
Port Cities	Parachute	Single	2021	Carleton Stone and Dylan Guthro

=== Songwriting credits (co-songwriter) ===
Artist	Title	Album	Year
Baby Nova	Dodge	Shhugar	2026
The Boojums	Football	The Boojums	2025
The Boojums	Gravy	The Boojums	2025
Maggie Andrew	Emotional Touchdown	How to Sing For Money	2025
Maggie Andrew	Unfinished Business	How to Sing For Money	2025
Maggie Andrew	How to Sing For Money	How to Sing For Money	2025
Maggie Andrew	Father Figure	How to Sing For Money	2025
Maggie Andrew	If God Was Real	How to Sing For Money	2025
Maggie Andrew	Did You Cry	How to Sing For Money	2025
Terra Spencer	Seventeen (1996 version)	Seventeen (1996 version)	2025
Maggie Andrew	Better Than You	Day Job	2024
Maggie Andrew	Hurt Myself	Day Job	2024
Maggie Andrew	About Us	Day Job	2024
Terra Spencer	Seventeen	Sunset	2024
East Pointers	Best Surprise	Single	2023
Matt Andersen	Only an Island	The Big Bottle of Joy	2023
Matt Andersen	Let It Slide	The Big Bottle of Joy	2023
Quake Matthews	Brunch	Summertime 6-pack	2023
Quake Matthews	Flowers on the Grace	The Darkroom	2023
Maggie Andrew	Better Than You	Single	2023
East Pointers	Save Your Lonely	Single	2022
Brynn Knickle	Fool For You	Single	2022
Chudi Harris	How It's Always Been	Single	2022
Willie Stratton	Chasing Rabbits	Drugstore Dreamin'	2022
Willie Stratton	Cruel	Drugstore Dreamin'	2022
Willie Stratton	Be Happy!	Drugstore Dreamin'	2022
Carleton Stone	House In The Hills	Single	2022
Carleton Stone	Papercut	Single	2022
Carleton Stone	Monte Carlo	Single	2022
Carleton Stone	Ice Age	Single	2022
Kelly Prescott	Trailer Trashed (Warner Canada)	Single	2021
Quake Matthews	The Talent Show	Single	2021
Willie Stratton	The Way She Holds Me	Single	2021
Willie Stratton	Need Your Love	Single	2021
Sunsetto	Downtown (Sony Canada)	Single	2021
Port Cities	Parachute	Single	2021
Neon Dreams	Lifestyles of the Broke and Nameless	The Happiness of Tomorrow	2020
Port Cities	I Still See You At Parties	Single	2020
Port Cities	Sorry	Single	2019
Reeny Smith	When Are You Lonely?	WWIII: Strength Courage Love	2018
Ria Mae	Red Light	Single	2018
Port Cities	Montreal	Single	2018
Port Cities	Idea of You	Single	2018
Port Cities	Idea of You	Single	2018
Donovan Woods	Burn That Bridge	Both Sides	2018
Port Cities	Back To The Bottom	Port Cities	2017
Port Cities	Don't Say You Love Me	Port Cities	2017
Port Cities	In The Dark	Port Cities	2017
Port Cities	Sound Of Your Voice	Port Cities	2017
Port Cities	How To Lose You	Port Cities	2017
Port Cities	Half The Way	Port Cities	2017
Port Cities	Body + Soul	Port Cities	2017
Port Cities	Astronaut	Port Cities	2017
Port Cities	In The Dark	Port Cities	2017
Port Cities	In The Dark	Port Cities	2017
Eric Stephen Martin	Memphis	Single	2017
Neon Dreams	Beat Of Your Heart	To You	2016
Dylan Guthro	Dance On Me	Dylan Guthro EP	2016
Dylan Guthro	Love Somebody	Dylan Guthro EP	2016
Dylan Guthro	Here Til The Mornin'	Dylan Guthro EP	2016
Donovan Woods	The First Time	Hard Settle, Ain't Troubled	2016
Donovan Woods	On The Nights You Stay Home	Single	2015
Classified feat. Snoop Dogg	No Pressure	Single	2015
River Town Saints	Little Bit Goes A Long Way	Single	2015
Emma Lee	All The Way	Single	2015
Tim Chiasson	Crushed	Single	2015
Dave Sampson	Last Two Standing	No Pressure No Diamonds	2014
Dave Sampson	The One	No Pressure No Diamonds	2014
Bobby Bazini	Bubblegum	Single	2014
Mo Kenney	Scene of the Crime	Mo Kenney	2014

== Awards and achievements ==
- With Port Cities (band)

Year	Award
2026	ECMA Award Nomination - Songwriter of the Year
2024	Unsigned Only Music Competition - Finalist AAA Category, "Fences"
	ECMA Award Nomination - Songwriter of the Year
2023	Music Nova Scotia Award Nomination - Pop Recording of the Year, "Papercut"
	ECMA Award Nomination - Contemporary Roots Recording of the Year, "Papercut"
2018	Slaight Music Juno Masterclass Winners
	Voted The Coast “Best of Halifax” - Best Folk Artist/Band (Gold)
	Voted The Coast “Best of Halifax” - Best Pop Artist/Band (Silver)
	Music Nova Scotia Award Nomination - Digital Artist of the Year
	ECMA Award Nomination - Pop Recording of the Year – Port Cities, Port Cities
	ECMA Award Nomination - Song of the Year – Port Cities, “Back To The Bottom”
	ECMA Award Nomination - Fans’ Choice Entertainer of the Year – Port Cities
2017	CBC Radio 2 2017 Charts Most Online Votes - #14 “In The Dark”
	CBC Radio 2 2017 Charts #1 songs of 2017 - #14 “Back to the Bottom”
	CBC Radio 2 2017 Charts #1 songs of 2017 - #14 “Back to the Bottom”
	Music Nova Scotia Award Winner Best Album - "Port Cities"
	Music Nova Scotia Award Winner Best Group Album - "Port Cities"
	Music Nova Scotia Award Winner Best Pop Album - "Port Cities"
	Music Nova Scotia Award Winner Entertainer of the Year
	Music Nova Scotia Award Winner Digital Artist of the Year
	Music Nova Scotia Award Nominee Video of the Year - "Trouble" (With Dave Sampson)
	SOCAN #1 Award - Back to the Bottom
	#1 CBC Radio Top 20 (February 23, 2017) - Back to the Bottom
	#1 Spotify Canada “Viral 50” Chart - Back to the Bottom
	Voted The Coast “Best of Halifax” - Best Music Video - “Astronaut” (Gold)
	Voted The Coast “Best of Halifax” - Best Artist / Band Most Likely To Make It Big (Silver)
	Voted The Coast “Best of Halifax” - Best Pop Artist/Band (Silver)
	#1 CBC Radio Top 20 (February 23, 2017) - Back to the Bottom
2016	Casino Nova Scotia Artist In Residence 2016 Winners
	Top 25 CBC Searchlight Competition
	Slaight Music Juno Masterclass Finalists

- As Carleton Stone

Year	Award
2015	ECMA Solo Recording of the Year Winner – Draws Blood
2014	Music Nova Scotia Award Winner Recording of the Year – Draws Blood
2014	Music Nova Scotia Award Winner Pop Recording of the Year – Draws Blood
2014	Music Nova Scotia Award Nominee Entertainer of the Year
2014	Music Nova Scotia Award Nominee Male Artist of the Year
2014	Music Nova Scotia Award Nominee SOCAN Songwriter of the Year with Dylan Guthro for "When You Come Home"
