= Breagh Isabel =

Canadian musician

- Occupations: Songwriter, performer, recording artist
- Instruments: Vocals, guitar
- Years active: 2009–present
- Website: http://www.breaghisabel.com/

Breagh MacKinnon (born 1991), known professionally as Breagh Isabel, is a Canadian recording artist, songwriter, and producer based in Halifax, Nova Scotia. She has written for a variety of artists, including Banners, Donovan Woods, Classified, and Ria Mae.

== Life and career ==
Born into a musical family on Cape Breton Island, Isabel began writing songs in high school. In college, she majored in jazz piano performance, while writing and recording music of her own. In 2015, Isabel, still performing as Breagh MacKinnon, teamed up with fellow singer-songwriters Dylan Guthro and Carleton Stone to form the band Port Cities. In 2016, the band was signed to Turtlemusik and Warner Music. Port Cities' debut album, produced by Gordie Sampson, was released on February 10, 2017. That same year, the band took home five Nova Scotia Music Awards, winning Entertainer of the Year, Digital Artist of the Year, Group Recording of the Year, Pop Recording of the Year, and recording of the Year.

Isabel parted ways with the band in 2019, following the release of their single "Sorry," which was co-produced by Grammy-winning Canadian songwriter and producer Greg Wells.

Isabel made her production debut in 2020, co-producing the single "Missing Me" by Jocelyn Alice and Mathew V, released in 604 Records. In the spring of 2020, under the name Breagh Isabel, she featured as a recording artist and co-writer on the single "Good News," by the award-winning Canadian rapper and producer Classified. Within one year of its release, "Good News" became a certified Gold single (40.000 units sold), peaked at #23 on the Canadian Billboard Charts, and has since generated more than 10 million digital streams.

Isabel is an out member of the LGBTQ community. In June 2021, she released her debut solo single, "Girlfriends" and its accompanying music video. "Girlfriends" tells a story of two young girls' friendship-turned-romance.

In 2020, Isabel joined the roster of Concord Music Publishing in Nashville, which has to led to her music being placed in major network promos (CBS, NBC, FOX), TV series (Grey's Anatomy, Virgin River, Sullivan's Crossing), and international marketing campaigns (Kia Motors, NSLC, Destination Cape Breton). Her work as a songwriter and producer has earned accolades, including SOCAN Songwriter of the Year - Music Nova Scotia (2021), East Coast Music Award for Song of the Year (2022), and a Canadian Screen Award nomination for her work on the soundtrack of Dawn, Her Dad & the Tractor (2023).

In 2023, Isabel began releasing music that has been featured in film or television under two side projects, Izzy Harlow and Sea Saint.

In September 2024, she released the single "Imposter," which reached number 6 on the CBC Top 20 chart and was featured in the LGBTQ film Lakeview, which premiered at the Halifax Film Festival in 2024.

== Selected discography ==
Year	Title	Artist(s)	Album	Credits
2016	"Between Cities"	Donovan Woods	Hard Settle, Not Troubled	Writer
2016	"I Don't Wanna Know"	Ria Mae	Ria Mae	Writer
2016	"Learning to Love"	David Myles	Here and Now	Writer, Artist
2017	"Astronaut"	Port Cities	Port Cities	Writer, Artist
2018	"Shots Fired"	Jodi Guthro	Single	Writer
2018	"Burn That Bridge"	Donovan Woods	Both Sides	Writer
2018	"Red Light"	Ria Mae	My Love EP	Writer, Artist
2018	"Montreal"	Port Cities	Port Cities	Writer, Artist
2018	"Idea of You"	Port Cities	Port Cities	Writer, Artist
2019	"Sorry"	Port Cities	Port Cities	Writer, Artist
2020	"Good News"	Classified, Breagh Isabel	Time EP	Writer, Featured Artist
2020	"Missing Me"	Jocelyn Alice, Mathew V	Single	Writer, Co-Producer
2020	"King of Spades 2"	T Thomason, Rose Cousins	Single	Writer, Co-Producer
2020	"SOS"	Margot Todd	Single	Writer, producer
2021	"Girlfriends"	Breagh Isabel	Single	Writer, Artist
2021	"The Bells Are Ringing"	Classified	Single	Writer, Artist
2021	"Some of Everything"	Mint Simon	Single	Writer
2021	"See the Sun"	RAI, Hunnuh	Single	Writer, producer
2021	"Winter Wonderland"	Breagh Isabel	Single	Artist
2022	"South Shore"	Moira and Claire	I'm Usually Not This Forward But	Producer
2022	"The Old Me"	Ria Mae	Therapy	Writer
2022	"Please Don't Go"	Ria Mae	Therapy	Writer / Co-Producer
2022	"Lose You to Love Me" (cover)	Ria Mae, Rose Cousins, Breagh Isabel	Single	Artist / Co-Producer
2022	"If I Lost You"	David Myles, Breagh Isabel	Single	Artist
2022	"Keeps Me Going"	Banners	I Wish I Was Flawless, I'm Not	Writer
2022	"All About You"	Classified, Brett Matthews, Breagh Isabel	Single	Artist
2022	"When the Day Is Done"	Marshall	Single	Producer
2023	"Coming For You"	Adona, Sea Saint	Single	Artist/Writer/Producer
2023	"Only an Island"	Matt Andersen	The Big Bottle of Joy	Writer
2023	"Ruinous Love"	T Thomason	Single	Co-Producer
2024	"Owner of a Lonely Heart" (cover)	Em Sherman, AG, Sea Saint	Single	Co-Producer, Artist
2024	"Imposter"	Breagh Isabel	Single	Artist/Writer
2024	"I've Got My Love to Keep Me Warm"	Breagh Isabel	Single	Artist/Co-Producer
2025	"The Way" (cover)	Sea Saint, Rose Cousins	Single	Artist/Producer
2025	"In Another World"	EJAE	Single	Writer
