= Vanic =

- Also known as: DJ Vanic
- Born: Jesse Hughes; May 6, 1989 (age 36)
- Origin: New Westminster, British Columbia, Canada
- Genres: Future bass; trap; house
- Occupations: DJ; producer
- Instruments: Digital audio workstation; piano
- Labels: Kannibalen; Seeking Blue
- Website: www.vanicmusic.com

Jesse Hughes (born May 6, 1989), known professionally as Vanic, is a Canadian DJ and producer, based in New Westminster, British Columbia.

== Early life ==
A metal enthusiast when he was in middle school, Hughes developed an interest in hardstyle and later in musical production. He played piano at the age of four. Hughes gained recognition for remixing songs for artists like Yeah Yeah Yeahs, Lana Del Rey and Birdy. He told Forbes "Family and personal issues came up in my life that made me re-evaluate my goals and direction. I decided that I might as well spend my youth trying for something really cool and different, something I was passionate about. And music was the obvious choice, it's been one of the biggest parts of my life..." Hughes, who studied business, dropped out of Simon Fraser University in an effort to pursue a successful musical career.

== Career ==
In 2014, he was featured on the song "Circles" by Machineheart, which received over a million streams in two weeks. In 2016, he signed a deal with Disruptor Records, a joint venture of Sony Music and Adam Alpert. He said "Adam and Disruptor were the right fit. Everything they do seems to be spot on, and they're really good people to work with." He released his debut single "Samurai" via the label. On January 20, 2017, he released the song "Too Soon" featuring Maty Noyes. According to Nielsen Music, the song received 740,000 streams in the United States and sold 1,000 downloads in its first tracking week. It debuted on the Billboard's Dance/Electronic Songs chart at 40th. His song "Staring at the Sun" was also released via Disruptor and featured Clara Mae. The song became his third single to be released on the label.

== Discography ==
=== Albums ===
List of studio albums
Title	Details
Here & Now	Released: 1 October 2021; Label: Seeking Blue Records; Formats: Digital download

=== Singles ===
==== As lead artist ====
Title	Year	Peak chart positions
Title	Year	US Dance
"Samurai" (featuring Katy Tiz)	2016	—
"Too Soon" (featuring Maty Noyes)	2017	40
"Staring At the Sun" (featuring Clara Mae)	2017	—
"Good On Me" (featuring Olivia Noelle)	2019	—
"Save Yourself" (featuring Gloria Kim)	2019	—
"Somedays"	2019	—
"Cannonball" (featuring Jocelyn Alice)	2019	—
"So Slow" (with K.Flay)	2020	—
"Sick Of It" (featuring Bryce Fox)	2020	—
"I'm Yours" (featuring Sylvie Cox)	2021	—
"Have My Back" (featuring Silent Child)	2022	—
"What Did I Do" (featuring CRÈME)	2022	—
"Sacrifice" (featuring Holy Wars)	2023	—
"Casper" (featuring Katy Tiz)	2025	—
"In My Mind" (featuring Casey Cook)	2025	—
"—" denotes a recording that did not chart or was not released in that territory.

==== As featured artist ====
Title	Year
"Circles" (Machineheart featuring Vanic)	2015

=== Remixes ===
- Big Sean – "Bounce Back"
- Birdy – "Skinny Love"
- CHVRCHES – "The Mother We Share"
- Tove Styrke – "Borderline"
- Coleman Hell – "2 Heads"
- K.Flay – "FML", “Make me fade”, “Cops”, "Can't Sleep"
- Lana Del Rey – "West Coast", "Summertime Sadness"
- Major Lazer featuring Wild Belle – "Be Together"
- The Chainsmokers – "Setting Fires"
- Zella Day – "Compass", "Hypnotic", "High", "Wonderwall"
- Above & Beyond - "We're All We Need"
- G-Eazy - "But A Dream"
- Apashe ft. Lia – "Behind My Eyes"
- Ben Howard – "The Fear"
- Skylar Grey – "Fucking Crazy"
- RIOT – "Down With Your Love"
