= Ria Mae =

Canadian singer and songwriter

- Born: Halifax, Nova Scotia, Canada
- Origin: Halifax, Nova Scotia
- Genres: Pop
- Occupations: Singer-songwriter, musician
- Instruments: Vocals, guitar
- Years active: 2009–present
- Label: Sony Music Canada
- Website: riamae.com

Ria MacNutt, known professionally as Ria Mae, is a Canadian singer and songwriter from Halifax, Nova Scotia.

== Career ==
As a child, Mae's family moved around Halifax, switching from school to school while she learned to write songs. Ria has described herself as a teenager who spent hours in her bedroom writing songs and teaching herself how to play guitar while rarely sharing them with anyone else. "I was super shy and just kept it hidden," she says. "I used to write about relationships but I never had one. It was just imagination stuff." She wouldn't play those songs in front of a big crowd until shortly before high school graduation.

But instead of pursuing a career in music, she briefly dabbled in construction management out of high school. Before long, she would return to music, playing in bars and clubs and steadily growing a fan base.

Her first release, the EP Between the Bad, was released in 2009. Two years later, Mae was chosen as a finalist in the Mountain Stage NewSong Contest, causing her to cancel her show at the Halifax Pop Explosion.

In 2011, Mae self-released her debut album Under Your Skin, recorded with Mir members Asif and Shehab Illyas at The Shire Studios in Halifax. Mae met the Illyas brothers while acting in Rohan Fernando's feature-length independent film, Snow, in which she played an itinerant singer. The Illyas brothers composed the score for Snow. Under Your Skin won an East Coast Music Award in 2012. In March 2012, the song "Under Your Skin" was chosen as a finalist in the Radio Star National Talent Search at Canadian Music Week.

In 2013 she was nominated for another ECMA for Song of the Year for her song "Leaving Today".

The single "Clothes Off" was released in 2015 and has received positive reviews. The themes behind the song were inspired by a visit to Montreal where Mae took in the nightlife. It is her first release with Sony Music Canada. The track is produced by Juno Award-winning hip-hop producer Classified, who Mae chose after hearing his work with David Myles and Chad Hatcher. "Clothes Off" was nominated for Juno Award for Single of the Year at the Juno Awards of 2016.

Mae was nominated for Songwriter of the Year at the 2015 East Coast Music Awards.

Her self-titled album was also produced by Classified and Mae has said she doesn't think the collaboration would've come about if they weren't both from Halifax. "(Halifax) makes for some really funny collaborations," she told The Canadian Press in an interview. "If I grew up in Toronto I wouldn't necessarily be collaborating with the most famous hip-hop artist (in the city)."

Classified co-wrote and produced Mae's hit song "Thoughts On Fire" and raps on the version featuring Classified. Mae wrote "Thoughts On Fire" the day she signed with Sony Music Entertainment Canada: "Despite being told 'no' for over a year, I just never stopped believing," she said. She is no longer signed to Sony. It is unclear why however the split comes following her 2019 release Stars which did not chart or become commercially successful.

Mae has performed at CMJ Music Marathon in New York City, Folk Alliance International in Memphis, Canadian Music Week in Toronto, Contact East in Fredericton, and at East Coast Music Awards Week. She has shared the stage with Family of the Year, Xavier Rudd, Buck 65, Classified, and opened for Elle King.

She is out as a member of the LGBT community.

Mae is a member of Canadian charity Artists Against Racism.

Mae portrayed a lesbian relationship in the music video for her single "Gold". It would later be acknowledged as a rare example of a positive lesbian relationship in a music video that didn't "exist solely for the titillation of straight men."

The singer told The Canadian Press that she struggled with playing an alternate version of her sexuality in a music video, concerned it might pigeonhole her career. After some consideration she changed her perspective: "I had this gut feeling, like, 'Shut up. It's good, and it's important,'" she said.

== Discography ==
=== Studio albums ===
Title	Details	Peak positions
Title	Details	CAN
Under Your Skin	Release date: August 30, 2011; Label: Ria Mae	—
Ria Mae	Release date: June 3, 2016; Label: Sony Canada	71
Two	Release date: November 7, 2025; Label: Capstan Music	
"—" denotes releases that did not chart

=== EPs ===
Title	Details	Peak positions
Title	Details	CAN
Between the Bad	Release date: November 17, 2009; Label: Ria Mae	—
My Love	Release date: November 3, 2017; Label: Sony Canada	83
Stars	Release date: March 8, 2019; Label: Sony Canada	—
Therapy	Release date: March 18, 2022; Label: Ria Mae	—
Tiny Strands	Release date: May 23, 2025; Label: Ria Mae	—
"—" denotes releases that did not chart

=== Singles ===
Year	Single	Peak positions				Certifications	Album
Year	Single	CAN	CAN AC	CAN CHR	CAN HAC	Certifications	Album
2012	"Under Your Skin"	—	—	—	—		Under Your Skin
2013	"Leaving Today"	—	—	—	—		Non-album single
2015	"Clothes Off"	31	30	13	8	MC: Platinum	Ria Mae
2016	"Gold"	98	38	31	18		Ria Mae
2016	"Ooh Love"	77	15	47	10	MC: Platinum	Ria Mae
2017	"Thoughts on Fire" (featuring Classified)	—	—	—	—		Ria Mae
2017	"Bend"	68	6	16	4	MC: Platinum	My Love
2017	"Red Light"	—	—	50	37		My Love
2018	"Hold Me" (featuring Frank Kadillac)	—	19	39	22		Stars
2019	"Too Close" (with Dan Talevski)	67	21	13	17	MC: Gold	Non-album single
2020	"For Your Love"	—	—	—	—		Therapy
2020	"Loser, Pt. 2" (with T. Thomason)	—	—	—	—		Non-album single
2020	"Lose You to Love Me" (with Breagh Isabel featuring Rose Cousins)	—	—	—	—		Therapy
2020	"Therapy" (with Jocelyn Alice)	—	—	—	—		Therapy
2020	"Swoon" (with Jocelyn Alice)	—	—	—	—		Therapy
2021	"Christmas (Baby Please Come Home)"	—	—	—	—		Non-album single
2022	"The Old Me"	—	14	—	17		Therapy
2022	"The World Is Falling Apart" (featuring Serena Ryder)	—	—	—	—		Non-album singles
2022	"Please Don't Go"	—	—	—	—		Non-album singles
2024	"IDFLM"	—	—	—	—		Tiny Strands
2024	"I Want It All"	—	—	—	—		Tiny Strands
2024	"Otherside"	—	—	—	—		Tiny Strands
2025	"Her Magic"	—	—	—	—		Two
2025	"The Ring (Damn!)"	—	—	—	36		Two
"—" denotes releases that did not chart

== Filmography ==
- Snow as an itinerant singer
