= The Cottars =

Canadian Celtic musical group

- Origin: Cape Breton Island, Nova Scotia, Canada
- Genres: Celtic
- Years active: 2000–present
- Members: Ciarán MacGillivray; Fiona MacGillivray; Bruce Timmins; Claire Pettit
- Past members: Rosie MacKenzie; Jimmy MacKenzie

The Cottars are a Canadian Celtic musical group from Cape Breton Island formed in 2000. The group's current members are Ciarán MacGillivray, Fiona MacGillivray, Bruce Timmins, and Claire Pettit.

== History ==
The Cottars were founded in late 2000 when two sets of siblings, Ciarán MacGillivray and Fiona MacGillivray of Albert Bridge, Nova Scotia, joined with Rosie MacKenzie (then age 11) and Jimmy MacKenzie of Baddeck, Nova Scotia.

In 2001, they released their first CD, Made In Cape Breton, on Warner Music. The disc, with their single, a cover of Tom Waits's "The Briar and the Rose", showcased John McDermott's vocals along with Fiona's in two duets. In 2003, they won the New Group of the Year award at the 2003 East Coast Music Awards. The members were each individually nominated for a Gemini Award in the same year in the category of Best Performance or Host in a Variety Program or Series for their performances at the 2003 East Coast Music Awards.

In 2004, the Cottars released their second CD, On Fire, for which they won the Best Roots/Traditional Album award at the 2005 East Coast Music Awards.

The group's third CD, Forerunner, was released on Rounder Records in January 2006, and was their first release in the U.S. It contained two new Tom Waits covers; "Georgia Lee" and "Hold On". In January and March 2006, the Cottars went on a tour of the US with The Chieftains which included a performance at Carnegie Hall in New York City, where they performed with Elvis Costello.

In mid-2006, the group announced they would disband, but they continued to perform together until the end of 2006. Some time later, the group started performing again under a new arrangement in which the MacKenzie siblings were replaced with fiddler Claire Pettit and guitarist Bruce Timmins. The band released their fourth CD, Feast, in February 2010 on Rounder Records, which features the new members, Timmins and Pettit, in addition to the MacGillivray siblings.

== Discography ==
- 2002 - Made In Cape Breton
- 2004 - On Fire
- 2006 - Forerunner
- 2010 - Feast
