= Jocelyn Alice =

Canadian singer and songwriter

- Born: Jocelyn Alice Strang; Calgary, Alberta, Canada
- Genres: Pop; indie rock
- Occupations: Singer; songwriter
- Years active: 2011–present
- Labels: Disruptor; Sony
- Website: jocelynalice.com

Jocelyn Alice Strang is a Canadian singer and songwriter. One half of the now defunct Canadian indie soul pop duo Jocelyn & Lisa from Calgary, Alberta, Alice began performing as a solo artist in 2015. Her debut single "Jackpot" was certified Platinum in Canada in September 2016 and reached the top 15 on multiple Canadian commercial radio charts. Alice's second single, "Feels Right", was certified Gold in Canada in February 2018. In December 2018, Jocelyn Alice received official Gold certification for her song "Bound To You".

== Career ==
=== Early work ===
At age 16, Alice competed in Canada's franchise of the Popstars reality show. She went on to work with producers Stacy Jones, Russell Broom, and Mitch Lee. Jocelyn has co-written music featured in the TV shows One Tree Hill and Pretty Little Liars,^{[2]} the movie Dear Santa, and a television commercial in Canada for Shaw TV. In addition, she was the vocalist in a USA nationwide television commercial for Target, which featured a cover of the song "Reach Out of the Darkness".

Alice approached Lisa Jacobs in 2011 and suggested they write a song together. In early 2012, the pair decided to formally collaborate under the name jocelyn & lisa. The duo's debut EP Weary Warrior charted #2 and #5 on University of Calgary radio station CJSW.

=== Solo career ===
In 2014, Alice co-wrote "Jackpot" with Hello Moth. It was released on YouTube on December 25, 2014. The song reached #43 on the Billboard Canadian Hot 100 chart the week of July 25, 2015, and climbed to #38 the following week. Jackpot was #9 on Spotify's 10 most viral tracks in the United States that same week.

In December 2015, Alice signed a record deal with Sony affiliate Disruptor Records, where she has teamed up with producer Ryan Guldemond. Alice released her debut EP Little Devil in 2018.

== Controversy ==
During her rendition of "O Canada" prior to the MLB All-Star game in Miami on July 11, 2017, Alice suddenly giggled after singing the line "God keep our Land", prompting a startled response from some players and fans in attendance. Alice received severe backlash from news outlets and online commenters, with several observing that she had disrespected and "butchered" the anthem, dubbing the rendition an "absolute disaster" and "one of the worst attempts in recent memory", and criticizing her singing in general. Alice later tweeted that the reason she had giggled was because she had seen some fellow Canadians on the big screen and was "overcome with excitement".

== Discography ==
=== Studio albums ===
| Title | Details |
|---|---|
| How Dare You. | Release date: November 22, 2019; Label: Jocelyn Alice Entertainment |

=== Extended plays ===
| Title | Details |
|---|---|
| Little Devil | Release date: September 28, 2018; Label: Disruptor, Sony |
| Baby Girl | Release date: July 8, 2022; Label: So This Is Music |

=== Singles ===
==== As lead artist ====
| Year | Single | Peak positions | | | | | Certifications | Album |
| Year | Single | CAN | CAN AC | CAN CHR | CAN Hot AC | US Dance Air. | Certifications | Album |
|---|---|---|---|---|---|---|---|---|
| 2015 | "Jackpot" | 38 | 12 | 14 | 13 | 37 | MC: Platinum | Little Devil |
| 2016 | "Feels Right" (Note: Only the Galloway remix of "Feels Right" is included on Little Devil.) | — | 34 | 32 | 31 | — | MC: Gold | Little Devil |
| 2017 | "Bound to You" | — | 16 | 42 | 18 | — | MC: Gold | Little Devil |
| 2018 | "I Know" | — | 41 | 35 | 24 | — | | Little Devil |
| 2018 | "Still Wondering" | — | 46 | 32 | 49 | — | | Little Devil |
| 2019 | "Sweetheart" | — | — | — | — | — | | How Dare You. |
| 2019 | "The Dark" | — | — | — | — | — | | How Dare You. |
| 2019 | "Spin Cycle" (featuring Rayelle) | — | — | — | — | — | | How Dare You. |
| 2019 | "Guess I Still Love You" | — | — | — | — | — | | How Dare You. |
| 2020 | "Therapy" (with Ria Mae) | — | — | — | — | — | | Therapy |
| 2020 | "Swoon" (with Ria Mae) | — | — | — | — | — | | Therapy |
| 2021 | "How Could You Not Know" | — | — | — | — | — | | Baby Girl |
| 2022 | "Heartbreak Station" | — | — | — | — | — | | Baby Girl |
| 2022 | "Better Days" (with Coleman Hell) | — | — | — | — | — | | Joyride! |
"—" denotes a recording that failed to chart.

==== As featured artist ====
| Year | Single | Album |
|---|---|---|
| 2017 | "I'm on Somethin'" (BRKLYN featuring Jocelyn Alice) | Non-album single |
| 2018 | "Radio Silence" (with R3hab) | The Wave |
| 2018 | "Things I've Learned" (with BRKLYN and Fairlane) | Things I've Learned |
| 2019 | "Mr Parachute" (Marshall featuring Jocelyn Alice) | Layers |
| 2019 | "Cannonball" (Vanic featuring Jocelyn Alice) | Non-album singles |
| 2019 | "Never Been Hurt Before" (Tep No featuring Jocelyn Alice) | Non-album singles |
| 2019 | "Red Flags" (with Nick Bateman and Elijah Woods) | Non-album singles |
| 2020 | "Nobody but You" (BRKLYN featuring Jocelyn Alice) | Non-album singles |
| 2020 | "Somebody Loves You" (White Panda featuring Jocelyn Alice) | Non-album singles |
| 2020 | "Missing Me" (with Mathew V) | Non-album singles |

== Awards and nominations ==
Alice was nominated for two 2016 Canadian Radio Music Awards, Best New Group or Solo Artist: AC; and Best New Group or Solo Artist: CHR. She was also nominated for Pop Artist of the Year and Single of the Year at Canadian Music Week 2016 Indie Awards.

Alice received a Pop/Rock Award for "Jackpot" at the 2016 SOCAN Awards.

Alice received a No.1 Song Award from SOCAN for co-writing the chart-topping song "The Drugs" by Mother Mother.
