= Aselin Debison =

Canadian musician

Aselin Ettinger (Debison)
- Born: Aselin Debison; June 27, 1990 (age 36)
- Origin: Glace Bay, Nova Scotia, Canada
- Genres: Pop
- Years active: 2002–present
- Labels: Sony Music Canada; Epic; Aselin Music Inc.
- Website: AselinDebison.com

Aselin Ettinger (née Debison; born June 27, 1990) is a Canadian pop and Celtic music singer.

== Career ==
Debison's singing career began in 1999, when she was asked to sing at a rally of protesting miners in her hometown. In the summer of 2000 she appeared as the closing act for Brookes Diamond's production of Drum - The Heartbeat of Nova Scotia on the Halifax Parade Square during the Tall Ships 2000 Festival. The ten year old wept from fear moments prior to bringing the square to silence with her haunting rendition of Farewell to Nova Scotia to close the show twice daily. Soon after this performance, she began working on a Christmas album The Littlest Angel which was released in 2001. In 2002, she was spotted by Sony Classical President, Peter Gelb at the East Coast Music Awards. Her debut album Sweet is the Melody appeared that same year.

In October 2002, Debison was chosen to sing for Queen Elizabeth II at the Roy Thomson Hall in Toronto, Ontario, during her visit to Canada for her Jubilee celebration.

Debison sang with country music artist and Runrig vocalist Bruce Guthro on a CBC (and later a PBS) special entitled "Aselin Debison: Sweet is the Melody". She performed selections from her debut album and also classic Cape Breton Island songs, such as the Island's anthem. During her tour to promote Sweet is the Melody, she performed in New York; Tokyo, Japan; and Seoul, Korea.

One track from the Sweet is the Melody, Debison's cover of the distinctive Israel Kamakawiwo'ole medley arrangement Somewhere over the Rainbow/What a Wonderful World, became popular in Korea and Japan. (This medley and adaptation of Over The Rainbow have frequently been wrongly attributed to American singer Norah Jones.) Thanks to its inclusion in soft pop compilation albums such as Sony Music Korea/Splash Music's 2003 Crossover Romance, it became a firmly established element of ambient music in many parts of east Asia. Debison also did covers of "Driftwood", a song by the Scottish band Travis, and Garth Brooks's recording of Stephanie Davis's Christmas song "The Gift". Several other tracks from Sweet is the Melody were also included in Korean and Japanese pop compilations. Debison's version of Mike Oldfield's "Moonlight Shadow" entered the pop music top 20 in many parts of Japan. "Sweet is the Melody" peaked at album number 8 on the Billboard charts and 55 on the authoritative Oricon pop charts in Japan. In Jan 2010, Debison's Asian success extended to Hong Kong, with "Sweet is the Melody" reaching number 60 on the KKBox Hong Kong classical album chart and the single "Moonlight Shadow" reaching number 46

In March 2005 Debison released her second album, Bigger than Me, and the singles "Life" and "Faze" have been popular on light rock and pop radio. Whereas Debison's early recordings consisted of cover versions, for Bigger than Me she wrote the material herself with assistance from Dave Thomson (co-founder of teen pop band Wave) and producer Thomas "Tawgs" Salter (initially renowned as a member of the 1990s Canadian rock band Dunk).

Canadian former Prime Minister Jean Chrétien has hailed Debison as the next Céline Dion. Debison received official congratulations for her musical success in a resolution from the Nova Scotia provincial legislature in April 2002.

== Personal life ==
Since her Bigger Than Me album from 2005, Debison has been almost completely out of the public eye. However, a fourth album called Homeward Bound was released in 2010 on her own label and is available to buy on cdbaby.com and iTunes. Her new single "Close To You" has also been released and can be found on the same album, Homeward Bound.

While continuing to perform, Aselin attended Glace Bay High School from grades 9-12 and graduated in 2008.

In 2012 she graduated from St. Francis Xavier University in Antigonish, Nova Scotia, after studying Human Kinetics and Pre-Education. She also graduated with a Double Minor in History/English.

After graduating from St.F.X. in 2012 she was accepted into the University of New Brunswick in Fredericton, New Brunswick and graduated with her Bachelor of Education (BEd) in 2013.

In early September 2013 her BEd was put into recognition as she started her teaching at Yarmouth Consolidated Memorial High School.

In 2012 she married former teacher, now principal of Tri-County Regional School Board, and musician, Jonathan Ettinger.

== Discography ==
=== Studio albums ===
| Date of Release | Title | Label |
|---|---|---|
| 2001 | The Littlest Angel | [Aselin Music Inc.] |
| October 2002 | Sweet is the Melody | Epic |
| February 2005 | Bigger Than Me | Epic |
| 2010 | Homeward Bound | [Aselin Music Inc.] |

== Award nominations ==
ECMA Nominations

- 2002 Pop Recording Of The Year – The Littlest Angel
- 2003 Female Artist Of The Year
- 2003 Roots/Traditional Artist Of The Year
- 2006 Female Artist Of The Year
- 2006 Single Of The Year – Life
- 2006 Pop Recording Of The Year – Bigger Than Me

Nova Scotia Music Award Nominations

- 2011 Country/Bluegrass Album Of The Year – Homeward Bound

Gemini Award Nominations

- 2003 Best Original Song - Centre Of My Heart (Performer)

Canadian Radio Music Awards

- 2006 – Best New Group Or Solo Artist – Aselin Debison - Faze

== Filmography ==
- Easter Seals Telethon (1998) TV Series .... Herself
- Sweet is the Melody (2003) Public TV Special ... Herself
- Rita MacNeil's Cape Breton (2007 – CTV) TV Series .... Herself
