= T. Thomason =

Canadian singer-songwriter

T. Thomason (born Molly Thomason) is a Canadian singer-songwriter based in Toronto, Ontario, best known for his appearance on the second season of the Canadian reality music competition, The Launch.

After releasing three albums under his former name, Thomason came out as non-binary in April 2015. He uses he/him pronouns. His most recent album, T. Thomason, was released on September 25, 2019.

== Biography ==
Thomason was born in Sidcup, Kent, England, in 1994, to Ed Thomason and actress Shelley Thompson. Thomason moved with his parents to Nova Scotia in 1996.

Thomason released his first CD, Through the Static, in June 2009. Produced by Tim Feswick, it was nominated for two Music Nova Scotia awards. Through the Static also produced two number-one songs on the East Coast Countdown: "Kiss Me," and "Text Book Cute." "Kiss Me" stayed at number one on the ECC for three weeks and in the top ten for nearly four months. "Kiss Me" was, furthermore, placed on the popular teen TV series Degrassi: The Next Generation.

Thomason's second CD, Beauty Queen, was released in 2011. The first single from Beauty Queen, "All Down The Highway," went to number one on the East Coast Countdown in July 2010. He received another placement on Degrassi: The Next Generation with "Trouble" from that album (aired August 2011).

Thomason's songs "Little Bones" and "People Lie" were semi-finalists in the International Songwriting Contest in 2010 and 2011. "People Lie" also won the Viewfinder Competition and was released as a video at the Atlantic Film Festival in 2010.

Thomason won a Canadian Folk Music Award in 2011 for Young Performer of the Year, the "She’s the One" competition at the 2012 Ottawa Bluesfest, and the Emerging Artist Series at Summerfest in 2013. He was also named one of Canada’s Top 20 Under 20 by Youth In Motion for his work as a human rights activist.

His 2014 album Columbus Field was produced by John-Angus MacDonald. The album was praised for Thomason's "fiery, Joan Jett-like" presence.

Thomason has performed original work at festivals throughout Canada including Canadian Music Week, North by Northeast, Luminato Festival, and World Pride in Toronto, ON; Stan Rogers Festival and Evolve Festival (voted Best Music Festival in Canada) in Nova Scotia; and at the Halifax Metro Centre as part of “Halifax for Haiti” joining Joel Plaskett, Classified, and Bruce Guthro on stage.

In 2023, Thomason had an acting role as Jackson Canaday in the television series Sullivan's Crossing.

== The Launch ==
Thomason is most recognized for his appearance as a contestant on the Canadian singing competition The Launch, during the second season's second episode. Thomason competed against four other Canadian-native musicians for the right to be "launched" into stardom, alongside a hit track written for the show by Jocelyn Alice and produced by Alex Hope, titled Hope. After progressing past the first round with a performance of his original song Loser, Thomason was declared the winner, beating out Mississauga-native Trevor LaRose, with his rendition of Hope bringing mentors Marie-Mai and Sarah McLachlan to tears. Following his victory and subsequent airing of the episode, Thomason released his rendition of Hope through Big Machine Records in February 2019.

Since their appearance on the show, Thomason and former mentor Marie-Mai have kept in touch and have collaborated. Thomason joined Marie-Mai on her Tournée Elle et Moi tour at her two performances in Montreal, Quebec, where they performed Hope together.

== Discography ==
- Through the Static (2009)
- Beauty Queen (2011)
- Columbus Field (2014)
- sweet baby (2017)
- T. Thomason (2019)
