= Dear Santa (2011 film) =

- Promotional poster
- Genre: Romantic drama
- Written by: Barbara Kymlicka
- Directed by: Jason Priestley
- Starring: Amy Acker; David Haydn-Jones; Emma Duke
- Theme music composer: Mitch Lee
- Country of origin: Canada
- Original language: English

Production
- Producers: Michael Frislev; Chad Oakes
- Cinematography: Dave Vernerey
- Editor: Bridget Durnford
- Running time: 90 minutes
- Production companies: Nomadic Pictures; ITV Studios America
- Budget: CAD 3,950,000

Original release
- Network: Lifetime
- Release: November 26, 2011

Dear Santa is a 2011 Canadian romantic drama television film directed by Jason Priestley and starring Amy Acker, David Haydn-Jones, and Emma Duke. Written by Barbara Kymlicka, the film is about a young woman struggling to get serious about her life who finds a letter to Santa from a seven-year-old girl asking for a new wife for her widowed father and decides to bring happiness to their lives. The film first aired on the Lifetime television network on November 26, 2011.

== Plot ==
Crystal Carruthers (Amy Acker) is a frivolous thirty-year-old woman drifting through life shopping with her wealthy parents' money. In an effort to get their daughter to get serious about her life, they inform her that she has until Christmas to change her life style or else they will cancel her credit cards. One day, Crystal discovers a letter to Santa Claus from a seven-year-old girl, Olivia (Emma Duke), asking him to send her widowed father a new wife for Christmas. Inspired by the young girl's hopeful letter, she decides to seek them out in the hopes of making herself their gift from Santa.

Olivia's father, Derek Gowen (David Haydn-Jones), owns a snow-plowing business and runs a local soup kitchen for the homeless. When Crystal tracks him down, she volunteers her time at the soup kitchen so she can get closer to him. At first, she is completely out of her element at the soup kitchen; but gradually she begins to care about the homeless. She and Derek become close, especially after she teaches Olivia some ice-skating moves at the local ice rink. Unfortunately, Derek's girlfriend Jillian (Gina Holden) seems to get in the way.

Crystal remains determined to make something of herself, despite the obstacles that stand in her way, and she begins to throw herself into her work at the soup kitchen. Meanwhile, Derek works overtime trying to earn extra money to pay the soup kitchen bills after receiving a Notice of Eviction. One evening, Crystal volunteers to watch Olivia while Derek goes out on an emergency snow-plowing job. Lacking any cooking skills, Crystal first burns their canned dinner, then orders pizza for them and listens while Olivia opens up about her memories of her mother. By the time Derek returns home, Crystal and Olivia are fast asleep. He invites Crystal to stay the night.

Gradually, Olivia improves her ice skating skills, and Derek becomes attracted to Crystal. Jillian reveals that Crystal lied about graduating college. Crystal learns that Derek will be forced to close the soup kitchen before Christmas because he owes the bank $10,000. At a party in Derek's house, Crystal leaves her handbag in the bathroom, where it's discovered by Jillian, who finds Olivia's letter to Santa. When she shows Derek the letter, he confronts Crystal and calls her a liar.

In the interim, Crystal has received a $10,000 check from her parents, their final payment to support her. She decides to use it to pay the bank to keep the soup kitchen open.

Soon after, Derek arrives at the soup kitchen prepared to close it down when he learns that someone paid the back rent. He goes home and discovers that Olivia is missing. Meanwhile, Crystal goes to the town Christmas tree and finds Olivia by the tree. Just as she tells the girl that she found her letter to Santa, Derek arrives; apologizes to her, and the three embrace each other.

== Cast ==
- Amy Acker as Crystal Carruthers
- David Haydn-Jones as Derek Gowen
- Emma Duke as Olivia Gowen
- Patrick Creery as Pete Kennedy
- Gina Holden as Jillian
- James Dugan as Frank McCourt
- Margherita Donato as Kim
- Brooklynn Proulx as Sharla
- Paulina Chmielecka as Saleswoman
- James D. Hopkin as Mr. Norman Lockhart
- Leah MacDonald as Clothing Store Assistant

== Production ==
Dear Santa was filmed on location in Calgary, Alberta, Canada, and Philadelphia, Pennsylvania.

== Critical response ==
Dear Santa received mixed reviews from critics. Radio Times gave it two out of five stars. In his review for Just Press Play, Rob Perez called the film "part family entertainment, part romance, and part holiday fantasy". According to Perez, while the film presents "good old fashion family values" and attempts to "tug at our heart strings", in the end it lacks substance and originality.
