= Gordie Sampson =

Canadian musician

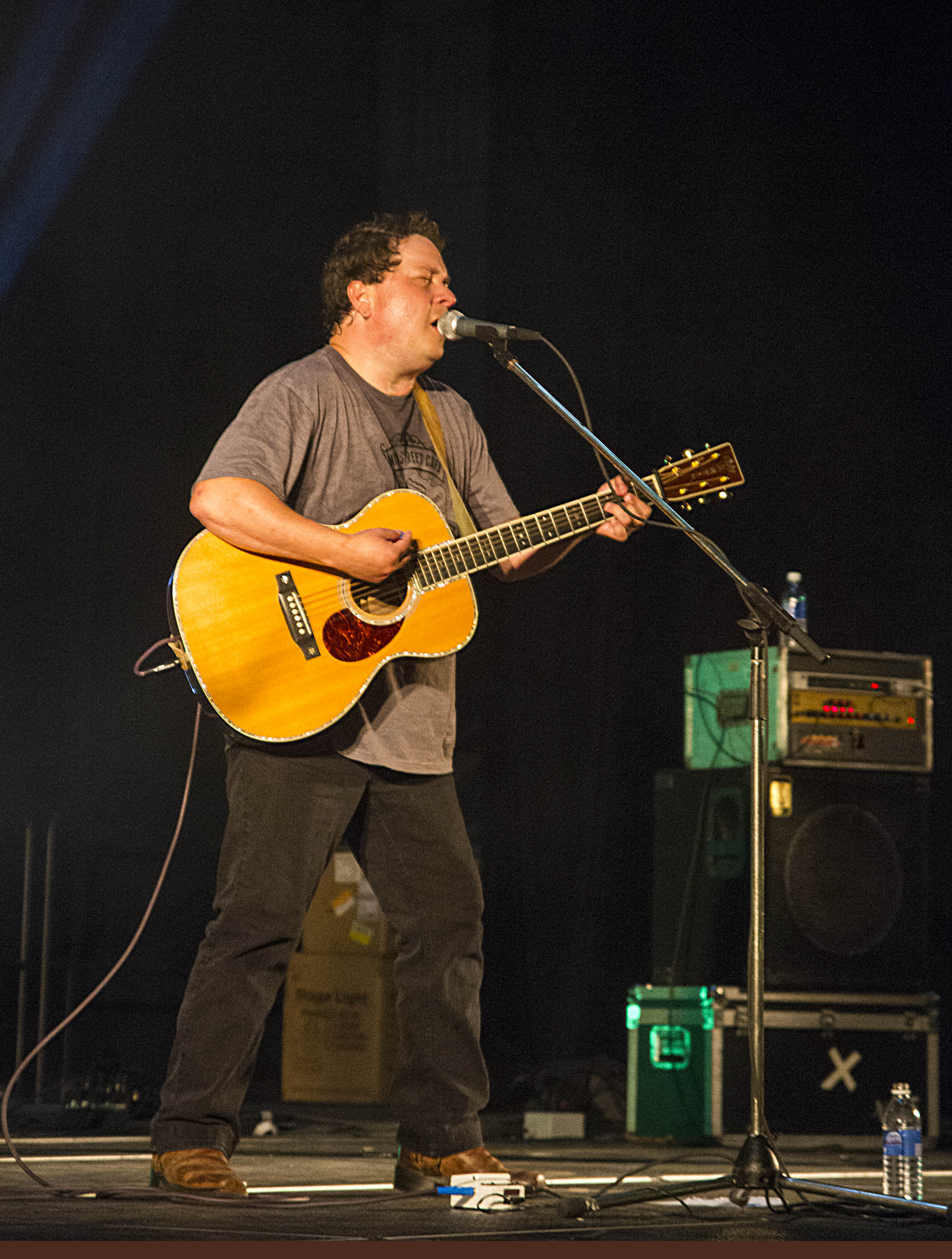
- Sampson performs at the Granville Green concert series in Port Hawkesbury, Nova Scotia in 2015

Background information
- Born: Gordon Francis Sampson; July 30, 1971 (age 55); Big Pond, Nova Scotia, Canada
- Genres: Pop, rock, country
- Occupations: Singer-songwriter, producer
- Instruments: Guitar, piano, bass, drums, bouzouki, accordion, fiddle
- Years active: 1990–present
- Label: MapleMusic
- Website: gordiesampson.com

Gordon Francis Sampson (born July 30, 1971) is a Canadian singer-songwriter and producer from Big Pond, Nova Scotia.

Beginning his career as a performer on his hometown island of Cape Breton, both in bands and on his own, Sampson has gone on to achieve international success as a songwriter in Nashville. He has written songs for Carrie Underwood, Keith Urban, Faith Hill, LeAnn Rimes, Blake Shelton, Miranda Lambert, and Rascal Flatts. He has also released albums as a solo performer.

Sampson has received a Grammy Award, a Juno Award, two ASCAP Awards, East Coast Music Awards, and honorary degrees from Cape Breton University and St. Francis Xavier University.

== Background ==
Sampson was born in 1971 to Francis Xavier Sampson (1946–2007) and Florence Ley. Sampson's only musical training as a child were piano lessons he took from his mother. He remembers being surrounded by fiddlers, who were very common in Cape Breton. Initially, he had no interest in fiddle music, but only wanted to be in a rock'n'roll band. He taught himself to play guitar and played in school bands in both junior high and high school, playing material from acts such as AC/DC and Black Sabbath.

Sampson attended Riverview Rural High School in the late 1980s. His first band was called Ricochet; he played with them at age 17, straight out of high school, going on a six-month tour of the Maritimes. After that, in the early 1990s, he was invited to join the Nova Scotia band Realworld with brothers Jamie and Matthew Foulds. The group released one CD, Dig; three singles from the album, all co-written by Sampson, were Top 10 hits in Canada in 1994. But the band was growing apart, and broke up later that year.

== Career ==
After Realworld disbanded, Sampson found himself increasingly interested in exploring the traditional Celtic music for which Cape Breton is well known. Gigging with local musicians led him to a place in Ashley MacIsaac's band just as MacIsaac was seeking a fusion of traditional Celtic music with contemporary rock'n'roll. Sampson co-wrote two songs on MacIsaac's successful 1996 debut album, Hi™ How Are You Today?.

Around this same time, Sampson became a part of Rita MacNeil's band, both on the road and on her popular weekly CBC show Rita and Friends. He also toured with the Nova Scotia-based family music group The Rankin Family.

Sampson recorded his first solo album in 1998, entitled Stones, which was recorded at Lakewind Sound Studios in Point Aconi, Nova Scotia—a recording studio Sampson and partner Fred Lavery built together in 1996. The album was nominated for a Juno Award; the single, "Sorry," won three East Coast Music Awards.

In the late 1990s, Sampson also began to concentrate more on his songwriting, with the aim of getting other musicians to record his songs. Over time he began to see how challenging this was going to be from his Cape Breton hometown. In 2005, he moved with his wife and baby to Nashville, even though knew very little about country music at that point.

Within a year, Sampson had co-written "Jesus, Take the Wheel" with Brett James and Hillary Lindsey. Former American Idol winner Carrie Underwood recorded it and the song held the number one spot on the Billboard country music chart for six weeks. Sampson has said that the song was inspired by the death of an acquaintance in a car accident on a highway in Nova Scotia two years earlier.

Sampson has been quoted as saying that the success of "Jesus, Take the Wheel" "worked wonders for my music career." He has since written songs which have been recorded by Faith Hill, Keith Urban, Trace Adkins, LeAnn Rimes, Martina McBride, Willie Nelson, and many other well-known country performers. He wrote the song "Any Other Day" for the 2007 Bon Jovi album Lost Highway. He has produced albums for Natalie MacMaster and Damhnait Doyle.

Sampson has also recorded three more solo albums since his 1998 debut. His second CD, Sunburn (2004), was largely written in partnership with Troy Verges and Blair Daly. Sampson produced the CD and played the majority of the instruments on the album, including guitars, bass, drums and piano. The album was recorded at Lakewind Sound Studios, as well as in studios in Toronto and Nashville. For The Few And Far Between was released in 2008; it was nominated for a 2009 Juno Award and was the recipient of two East Coast Music Awards. Almost Beautiful came out in 2011, and is the first solo album of his move away from the rootsy pop music of his previous releases and towards the kind of country music he has been writing for others for many years.

Sampson lives in Nashville with his wife, Helen Musial, and their daughter Amelie. He still returns to Cape Breton for a couple of months every summer.

In 2010, the Gordie Sampson Songcamp was conceived by Sampson as a way to encourage and develop young songwriters from across Nova Scotia. Sampson attends the intensive, five-day event every year, often accompanied by special professional guests. In July 2019, Sampson held the 10th Anniversary edition of his Songcamp, hosting 37 songwriters and 10 world-class writer/producer guests. Over 500 songs have been penned at the camp during its ten-year run.

== Discography ==
=== Albums ===
- Stones (1998)
- Sunburn (2004)
- For the Few and Far Between (2008)
- Almost Beautiful (2011)

=== Singles ===
| Year | Single | Chart Positions | Album |
| Year | Single | CAN AC | Album |
|---|---|---|---|
| 1999 | "Sorry" | 20 | Stones |
| 2004 | "Sunburn" | * | Sunburn |
| 2005 | "Hangin' by a Wire" | * | Sunburn |
| 2005 | "You (Or Somebody Like You)" | * | Sunburn |
| 2011 | "Hurricane Jane" | * | Almost Beautiful |
| 2012 | "Any Other Memory" | * | Almost Beautiful |
| 2012 | "Thank My Lucky Stars" | * | Almost Beautiful |

== Gordie Sampson songs covered by other artists ==
These are songs written or co-written by Sampson and covered by other artists:

- "Girl With Her Guard Up" Trannie Anderson, Girl With Her Guard Up (2025) Sony Music Publishing (US) LLC
- "Work Like That" Lily Rose, I Know What I Want (2025) Lily Rose Music
- "Saying Something" Amelie Sampson, Saying Something (2025) Trickshot Records
- "Fight For It" Ashley Monroe, The Blade (10th Anniversary Edition) (2025) Rhino/Warner Records
- "Tequila Memory" Brandy Neelly, Tequila Memory (2025) Brandy Neelly
- "Another Version of You" Amelie Sampson, Another Version of You (2025) Trickshot Records
- "I Don't Want You" Hailey Whitters; Charles Wesley Godwin, I Don't Want You (2025) Pigasus Records/Big Loud Records
- "The F Word" Ashley Cooke, The F Word (2025) Big Loud Records
- "Houdini" Amelie Sampson, Houdini (2025) Fifth of July Music
- "Reason to Love" Chad Brownlee, Reason to Love (2025) Chad Brownlee
- "Margarita Man" Dos Borrachos; Kevin Fowler; Roger Creager, Margarita Man (2025) Dos Borrachos
- "If I Ever Get to Heaven" Daniel Seavey, If I Ever Get to Heaven (2024) Atlantic Records
- "Welcome to Rock Bottom" Jade Eagleson, Worth the Double (2024) Starseed Records
- "Takes Me Back" Tyler Joe Miller, Takes Me Back (2024) TJM Music
- "Loser" Colin Elmore; Hillary Lindsey, Loser (2024) A Wolf Named Howard
- "Breaking Dishes" Caylee Hammack, Breaking Dishes (2024) Capitol Nashville
- "Pretty Please" Josh Turner, This Country Music Thing (2024) MCA Nashville
- "What Good is a Memory" Tyler Joe Miller, What Good is a Memory (2024) TJM Music
- "Good Me Bad" The Washboard Union, Westerly (2024) Washboard Union Productions
- "Highway Towns" Sykamore, Through the Static (2024) Sykamore
- "I Don't Whiskey Anymore" Randall King, Into the Neon (2024) Warner Music
- "Sleeping With Her" Teign Gayse, Single (2023) Indie
- "When the Lights Go On" Sarah Jarosz, Polaroid Lovers (2023) Rounder
- "Missing Someone" Dan + Shay, Bigger Houses (2023) Warner Music
- "Neon Dreamin'" Jade Eagleson Do It Anyway (2023) Starseed Records
- "The Hard Way" Payton Smith, What Colors Your Wild (2023) Combustion Master
- "Lately" Caitlin Smith, I Think of You (The Heartache Collection) (2023) Monument Records
- "Loser" Mike Ryan, Longcut (2022) Rock & Soul
- "Won't Take Long" Tyler Thompson, Single (2022) Sony Music
- "The Last Time" Tenille Townes, Single (2022) Columbia Nashville
- "If We Were A Country Song" Madison Kozak, Single (2022) Songs & Daughters / Big Loud Records
- "Something New" The Abrams, Single (2022) Anthem Entertainment L.P.
- "My Weakness" Jason Aldean, Single (2022) Macon Music, LLC under exclusive license to This Is Hit, Inc. d/b/a Broken Bow Records
- "If I Got You" Jordyn Pollard, Single (2022) Jordyn Pollard
- "Downtown Baby" Caitlyn Smith, High (2022) Monument Records, A Division of Sony Music Entertainment
- "I Don't Like The World Without You" Caitlyn Smith, High (2022) Monument Records, A Division of Sony Music Entertainment
- "Look At The Mess I'm In" Danielle Bradbury, In Between: The Collection (2022) Big Machine Label Group, LLC
- "Things People Say" Ben Chapman, Channing Wilson, Make the Night Better (2022) Hippie Shack
- "Get Me Through December" Alejandro Fuentes; Sofie Fjellvang, Get Me Through December (2021) Arista
- "Get Me Through December" BJ Speer, Christmas: Love, Hope & Treasured Memories (2021) Moving Mountains Ministries
- "Get Me Through December" Eleanor McCain; National Arts Centre Orchestra, I Can See Hope From Here (2021) Retriever Records Ltd.
- "Song Still Gets Me" Sarah Darling, Song Still Gets Me (2021), Tone Tree Music
- "No" Hunter Hayes, Wild Blue (Complete) (2021) LP Entertainment
- "Sky Without Stars" Jonathan Hutcherson, Jonathan Hutcherson (2021) CN Records
- "Stop Draggin' Your Boots" Danielle Bradbery Single (2021) Big Machine Label Group, LLC.
- "Kiss About It" Cash Campbell, Single (2021) Captain & Bear Records
- "You're Gonna Love Me" Hannah Dasher, The Half Record (2021) Sony Music Entertainment
- "Ask Her To Dance" Hunter Brothers, Been a Minute (2021) Open Road Music Inc.
- "You Can't Always Be 21" Don Amero Single (2021) MDM Recordings
- "Back To Myself" Serena Ryder, The Art of Falling Apart (2021) Serenader Source Inc. / ArtHaus
- "Used To You" Serena Ryder (2021), The Art of Falling Apart Serenader Source Inc. / ArtHaus
- "Differently" Serena Ryder (2021), The Art of Falling Apart Serenader Source Inc. / ArtHaus
- "All The Love" Serena Ryder (2021), The Art of Falling Apart Serenader Source Inc. / ArtHaus
- "Better Now" Serena Ryder (2021), The Art of Falling Apart Serenader Source Inc. / ArtHaus
- "Kid Gloves" Serena Ryder (2021), The Art of Falling Apart Serenader Source Inc. / ArtHaus
- "Bus Stop" Serena Ryder (2021), The Art of Falling Apart Serenader Source Inc. / ArtHaus
- "Thinking About You" Serena Ryder, The Art of Falling Apart (2021) Serenader Source Inc. / ArtHaus
- "Candy" Serena Ryder (2021), The Art of Falling Apart Serenader Source Inc. / ArtHaus
- "Waterfall" Serena Ryder, The Art of Falling Apart (2021) Serenader Source Inc. / ArtHaus
- "Chills" Shantelle Davidson, Single (2021)
- "When It All Sinks In" Adam Hambrick The Flipsides (2021) Buena Vista Records / UMG Recordings, Inc.
- "Kid Gloves" (Junia-T Remix) Serena Ryder; Junia-T, Better Now (2021) ArtHaus
- "So Crazy It Just Might Work" The Reklaws Sophomore Slump (2020) Universal Music Canada
- "Sunshine State of Mind" Adam Hambrick, Topdown, Southbound (2020) Capitol Nashville
- "Heaven Down Here" Mickey Guyton (2020) UMG Nashville
- "Gold" Corey Kent Single (2020) Combustion Masters
- "Best Nights" Alana Springsteen Single (2020) Warehouse West Entertainment Records
- "True Crime" Scott Helman Nonsuch Park (2020) Warner
- "Lois" Scott Helman Nonsuch Park (2020) Warner
- "Papa" Scott Helman Nonsuch Park (2020) Warner
- "Get Over You" Lindsay Ell, Heart Theory (2020) Stoney Creek
- "King Size Bed" Caylee Hammack (2020) Single Capitol Nashville, UMG
- "Looking for a Lighter" Caylee Hammack (2020) Single Capitol Nashville, UMG
- "The Most Beautiful Things" Tenille Townes (2020) Sony Music Entertainment
- "Under Your Spell" Eric Paslay, Nice Guy (2020) Paso Fino Records LLC
- "Buckingham and Nicks" Towne (2020) Towne
- "If She Only Knew" Washboard Union Everbound (2020) Warner Bros. Canada
- "One More One More" Washboard Union Everbound (2020) Warner Bros. Canada
- "I Don't Want to Love You Anymore" Caitlyn Smith (2020) Monument Records, a division of Sony Music Entertainment
- "Midnight in New York City" Caitlyn Smith (2020) Monument Records, a division of Sony Music Entertainment
- "You Kissed Me First" Carly Pearce (2020) Big Machine Label Group, LLC
- "Damn You For Breaking My Heart" Caitlyn Smith (2019) Monument Records, a division of Sony Music Entertainment
- "Everyone Loves Me But You" Jodi Guthro Single (2019) Dreaming Out Loud Entertainment
- "My Favourite Picture of You" Willie Nelson (2019) Sony Music Entertainment
- "Get Me Through December" Jordan Musycsyn, Around the Fire (2019) Jordan Musycsyn
- "Wild Blue" Hunter Hayes, Wild Blue (2019) Warner Music Nashville
- "Get Me Through December" Janelle Scott; Amber Mailloux; Mike Tompa, Echoes of a Songbird (2019) Janelle Scott
- "Household" Madison Kozak Single (2019) Songs & Daughters / Big Loud Records
- "The Way You Roll" Chad Brownlee (2019) Universal Music Canada Inc.
- "Hang Ups" remix Scott Helman; Blas Cantó Single (2019) Warner Music Canada
- "Halfway Tree" The East Pointers Single (2019)
- "Mystery Cove" The East Pointers, Yours To Break (2019)
- "Mary Brown" Chris Kirby, What Goes Around (2019) Dipole Productions
- "Elmira" The East Pointers, Yours To Break (2019)
- "One On The Way" Steve Moakler, Blue Jeans (2019) CN Records
- "Outcast" MAJE Mitchell Bailey Gordie Sampson, The Gordie Sampson Songcamp 2010–2019 Compilation Disc (2019) Gordie Sampson Songcamp
- "Temporary Forever" Makayla Lynn, The Gordie Sampson Songcamp 2010–2019 Compilation Disc (2019) Gordie Sampson Songcamp
- "Missed Call" Damhnait Doyle, Liquor Store Flowers (2019)
- "21 Days" Damhnait Doyle, Liquor Store Flowers (2019)
- "Best Hangover" Wes Mack Maddie Storvold Single (2019) Creator Brand Label Co.
- "Gold" Cold Creek County featuring Rachel Wammack Single (2019) Sony Music Entertainment Canada Inc.
- "Tell Me Something I Don't Know" Trisha Yearwood, Every Girl (2019) Gwendolyn Records, LLC.
- "Drink Up" Trisha Yearwood Kelly Clarkson, Every Girl (2019) Gwendolyn Records, LLC.
- "I'll Carry You Home" Trisha Yearwood Kelly Clarkson, Every Girl (2019) Gwendolyn Records, LLC.
- "Good and Gone" Seaforth (2019) RCA Records Label Nashville
- "Knockin' Boots" Luke Bryan (2019) Row Crop under exclusive license to UMG
- "Heartbreak" Hunter Hayes Visualizer (2019) Atlantic
- "Family Tree" Caylee Hammack (2019) Single Capitol Nashville, UMG
- "Noise" Cody Johnson, Ain't Nothing To It (2019) Warner Music Nashville
- "Boom Town" Dave Sampson, All Types of Ways (2019)
- "Trouble" Dave Sampson, All Types of Ways (2019)
- "Jersey On the Wall" Tenille Townes The Living Room Work Tapes (2018) Columbia Nashville
- "Closer to You" Carly Pearce Single (2018) Big Machine
- "Hangups" Scott Helman Hang Ups(2018) Warner
- "More" Clare Dunn Single (2018) MCA Nashville; UMG
- "Orphan" Ashley Monroe Sparrow (2018) Warner Bros.
- "Dear Drunk Me" Chad Brownlee Single (2018) Universal Music Canada
- "She Gets Me" Washboard Union What We're Made Of (2018) Warner Bros. Canada
- "Keep You Crazy" Washboard Union What We're Made Of (2018) Washboard Union Productions .
- "Brooklyn" Patrick Droney, Patrick Droney (2018) Patrick Droney. Distributed by AWAL
- "The Leavin'" The Belles The Belles (2018) Creekhouse Entertainment/See Blue Music
- "Crazy Does" Steve Moakler Born Ready (2018) CN
- "Thirty" Steve Moakler Born Ready (2018) CN
- "Noise" Shenandoah (band), Reloaded (2018) BMG
- "Put a Little Love on It" Aaron C. Lewis, Put a Little Love on It (2017)
- "Creature Machine" – TRALA (2017) TRALA
- "Everywhere" Gay Nineties, Decadent Days (2017) Love Letter
- "Hungover It" Rivertown Saints, Rivertown Saints (2017) Open Road
- "Two Weeks" The East Pointers, What We Leave Behind (2017)
- "Half the Way" Port Cities (band), Port Cities (2017) Warner Music Canada/turtlemusik
- "The Out" Port Cities (band), Port Cities (2017) Warner Music Canada/turtlemusik
- "Body + Soul" Port Cities (band), Port Cities (2017) Warner Music Canada/turtlemusik
- "How to Lose You" Port Cities (band), Port Cities (2017) Warner Music Canada/turtlemusik
- "Astronaut" Port Cities (band), Port Cities (2017) Warner Music Canada/turtlemusik
- "In the Dark" Port Cities (band), Port Cities (2017) Warner Music Canada/turtlemusik
- "Sound of Your Voice" Port Cities (band), Port Cities (2017) Warner Music Canada/turtlemusik
- "Back to the Bottom" Port Cities (band), Port Cities (2017) Warner Music Canada/turtlemusik
- "Play That Party Song" Michael Tyler, 317 (2017) Reviver
- "Confessions" Quake Matthews feat Neon Dreams, Celebrate the Struggle (2017)
- "All the Love You Left Me" Sara Evans, Words (2017) Born to Fly
- "I Don't Trust Myself" Sara Evans, Words (2017) Born to Fly
- "Diving in Deep" Sara Evans, Words (2017) Born to Fly
- "Rescue" Hunter Hayes, Single (2017) Atlantic for the United States and WEA International outside U.S. A Warner Music Group Company
- "Wheels" Steve Moakler (2017) CN
- "Good" David Ryan Harris Songs for Other People (2017) Peace Pourage
- "If I Didn't Love You" Caitlyn Smith Starfire (2017) Monument
- "Cheap Date" Caitlyn Smith Starfire (2017) Monument
- "East Side Restaurant" Caitlyn Smith Starfire (2017) Monument
- "This Town Is Killing Me" Caitlyn Smith Starfire (2017) Monument
- "Get Me Through December" Magnus Carlsson, Once Upon a Christmas Night (2016) The Republic
- "That Kind of Beautiful" Sister Hazel Lighter in the Dark (2016) Croakin' Poet
- "The Other Side of the Radio" Brent Anderson, The Other Side of the Radio (2016) Sea Gayle
- "Better Than You" Will Hoge, Small Town Dreams (2016) Cumberland
- "Who Would It Be" Craig Morgan, A Whole Lot More to Me (2016)
- "Ride On" Aaron C. Lewis, Single (2016)
- "Found" Aaron C. Lewis, Single (2016)
- "That's the Thing About Love" Martina McBride Reckless (2016) Big Machine
- "The First Time" Donavan Woods, Hard Settle, Ain't Troubled (2016) Meant Well
- "Everybody Wants to Be Loved" Martina McBride (2016) Big Machine
- "The Thing About Love" Martina McBride (2016) Big Machine
- "All the Way" Matt Andersen (2016) True North
- "Love Drunk" Steve Moakler (2016) Creative Nation
- "Hole in the World" Performed by Hayden Panettiere on Nashville (2012 TV series) (2016)
- "Boomtown" Performed by Will Chase and Hayden Panettiere on Nashville (2012 TV series) (2016)
- "God, Your Mama, and Me" – Florida Georgia Line ft. Backstreet Boys (2016)
- "City Girl" Ryan Hurd (2016) Sony
- "Warm Beer" Aaron C. Lewis, Single (2015)
- "Get Me Through December" Lianne Carroll, Seaside (2015) Linn Records
- "Russian History" Two Story Road Two Story Road EP (2015)
- "Boombox" Two Steps Back (2SB), Two Steps Back (2SB) (2015)
- "Withdrawals" Tyler Farr (2015) Columbia Nashville
- "Sins of Saturday Night" Alan Doyle, So Let's Go (2015) Skinner's Hill Music
- "Skyscrapers" Neon Dreams, The Last of Us (2015)
- "The Getaway" Christopher Brown, Christopher Brown (2015)
- "Get Me Through December" Eimear Reynolds Single (2015)
- "Get Me Through December" The Outside Track, Light Up The Dark (2015)
- "I Am What I Am" Laura Bell Bundy, Another Piece of Me (2015) Big Machine
- "We Need to Talk" BACHMAN (2015) 12 Hit Wonder/Linus Entertainment
- "Bombshell" Ashley Monroe (2015) Warner Music Nashville
- "I Hope Its Me" Brett Kissell (2015) Warner Music Canada
- "Down in Flames" Chris Isaak (2015) Vanguard
- "No Pressure" Classified (rapper) ft. Snoop Dogg (2015) Half Life
- "Get Me Through December" Adrianne & Mike, Where the Heart Lies (2014) Adrianne & Mike
- "Can't Say No To You" Hayden Panettiere and Chris Carmack (2014) Big Machine
- "Change Your Mind" Performed by Clare Bowen on Nashville (2012 TV series) (2014)
- "The Long Way Home" John Landry, Bottom of the Ninth (2014)
- "I Faked It" Mo Kenney, In My Dreams (2014) Pheromone
- "Loses Its Shine" Tim Chaisson, Lost in Light (2014) MDM
- "Drink You Up" Sarah Davidson (2014) Suretone
- "Let There Be Lonely" Secret Sisters (2014) Republic
- "Blame It All On You" Jimmy Rankin (2014) Fontana North
- "Falling So Hard" Jimmy Rankin (2014) Fontana North
- "Talk Myself Outta Fallin'" Radney Foster (2014) Devil's River
- "Noise" Radney Foster (2014) Devil's River
- "The Songwriters" Willie Nelson (2014) Sony
- "You Know You're Home" Tim Hicks (2014) RGK
- "747" Lady Antebellum (2014) Capitol Nashville
- "Girl in Your Truck Song" Maggie Rose (2014) RPM Entertainment
- "Nothing Like Starting Over" Hunter Hayes (2014) Atlantic
- "Look Who's Lonely Now" Dave Sampson No Pressure No Diamonds (2014)
- "Let There Be Lonely" Jonathan Jackson, Nashville Cast (2014) Big Machine
- "It's Just My Heart Talkin'" Los Lonely Boys (2014) BMI
- "Dreamgirl" The Best of Me: Original Motion Picture Soundtrack Hunter Hayes (2014) EMI Nashville/Relativity
- "Sing to Me" Dylan Guthro Breagh MacKinnon, (2013) Turtlemusik
- "Wherever You Are" Tim Chaisson, The Other Side (2013) Nettwerk Productions Ltd.
- "All Cried Out" Kree Harrison, (May 2013) 19 Recordings
- "Bourbon in Kentucky" Dierks Bentley (2013) Capitol Nashville
- "This Car" Cassadee Pope (2013) Republic Nashville
- "Last Two Standing" Dave Sampson The Gordie Sampson Songcamp (2013) Turtlemusik
- "Harbourtown" Breagh MacKinnon The Gordie Sampson Songcamp (2013) Turtlemusik
- "Pretty Good Mistake" Amy Wilcox Amy Wilcox (2013)
- "I Wish I Could Break Your Heart" Cassadee Pope (2013) Republic Nashville
- "If I Had Another Heart" Randy Rogers Band (2013) MCA Nashville
- "My Favourite Picture of You" Guy Clark (2013) Dualtone
- "Rodeo" Rachel Bradshaw (2013)
- "23 Degrees and South" Billy Currington (2013) Mercury Nashville
- "Good with Wine" Eric Paslay (2013) EMI Nashville
- "Song About a Girl" Eric Paslay (2013) EMI Nashville
- "Jesus Take the Wheel" Danielle Bradbery (2013) Big Machine
- "Good Advice" Guy Clark My Favorite Picture of You (2013) Dualtone Music Group
- "Never Like This" Danielle Bradbery (2013) Big Machine
- "Famous" Kelleigh Bannen (2013) EMI Nashville
- "Dear Heart" Tenille (2013) Royalty
- "My Favourite Picture of You" Jerry Jeff Walker, This One's For Him: A Tribute to Guy Clark (2012) Icehouse Music
- "You Move Me" Mark Cameron Just the Way You Like It (2012)
- "Damn That Dress" Mark Cameron Just the Way You Like It (2012)
- "Black Coffee" Mark Cameron Just the Way You Like It (2012)
- "It Still Hurts" Mark Cameron Just the Way You Like It (2012)
- "Where the Nightingales Sing" Alan Doyle, Boy on Bridge (2012) Skinner's Hill
- "I've Seen a Little" Alan Doyle, Boy on Bridge (2012) Skinner's Hill
- "Under the Waves" Songs And Story: Finding Nemo (2012) Disney
- "Too Good to Be True" Edens Edge (2012)
- "Over You By Now" Jana Kramer (2012)
- "Let It Hurt" Rascal Flatts, Changed (April 2012) Big Machine
- "Great Big Love" Rascal Flatts, Changed (April 2012) Big Machine
- "Leave Love Alone" Carrie Underwood, Blown Away (May 2012) Arista
- "Get Me Through December" Jayne Grace, Through Our Eyes (2011) Jayne Grace
- "Discovering Gold" Aaron C. Lewis, Discovering Gold (2011)
- "Wishing Well" Aaron C. Lewis, Discovering Gold (2011)
- "Pretty Red Dress" Tara Oram, Revival (2011)
- "My Favourite Picture of You" Jerry Jeff Walker, A Tribute to Guy Clark (November 2011) Icehouse Music
- "Better in the Long Run" Miranda Lambert w/ Blake Shelton, Four the Record (November 2011) Sony
- "Storm Warning" Hunter Hayes, Hunter Hayes (October 2011) Atlantic
- "The Songwriters", Bill Anderson, Songwriter (2011)
- "Tupelo" Lauren Alaina, Wildflower (October 2011) Mercury
- "She's a Wildflower" (aka "Wildflower") Lauren Alaina, Wildflower (October 2011) Mercury
- "Hard Time Moving On" David Bradley, Best of British and Irish Country 2011 (August 2011) Xiaohua
- "Miss Me For a Minute" Melissa Rae Barrie, Breakaway (June 2011) 604 Records Inc.
- "Love Looks Good On You" Randy Travis & Kristin Chenoweth, Anniversary Celebration (June 2011) Warner Bros.
- "One Last Goodbye" Donny & Marie Osmond, Donny & Marie (May 2011) MPCA
- "Paper Heart" Stealing Angels, Stealing Angels (May 2011) Skyville
- "Kiss You Like You're Never Coming Back" Sarah Mare, You're My Summertime (2010)
- "Everybody Wants to Be a Redneck" John Landry, Changing Man (2010)
- "Kiss Goodbye" Little Big Town, The Reason Why (August 2010) Capitol
- "Fuck Last Night" Slowcoaster Darkest of Discos (2010)
- "Damn the Rain" Randy Rogers, Band Burning the Day (August 2010) MCA Nashville
- "Unmistakeable" Jo Dee Messina, Unmistakable (April 2010) Curb
- "She's a Wildflower" (aka "Wildflower") Point of Grace, No Changin' Us (March 2010) Word Entertainment
- "Too Far to Drive" Aselin Debison, Homeward Bound (2010) Aselin
- "Close to You" Aselin Debison, Homeward Bound (2010) Aselin
- "Lie a Little" Aselin Debison, Homeward Bound (2010) Aselin
- "Learning to Fly" Aselin Debison, Homeward Bound (2010) Aselin
- "So Sorry Mama" Whitney Duncan, Footloose Soundtrack (2010) Warner Bros.
- "Beautiful Shame" Pauline Reese Just Getting Started (2010) Bandstand
- "Hard Time Movin' On" ft. Rodney Crowell David Bradley Movin' On (2010) Gecko Music Productions
- "My Kind of Radio" Jo Hikk, Ride (2009)
- "This Time" Carrie Underwood, Play On (November 2009) Arista Nashville
- "Someday When I Stop Loving You" Carrie Underwood, Play On (November 2009) Arista Nashville
- "That Kind of Beautiful" Emerson Drive, Believe (May 2009) Valory
- "You Don't Know How Beautiful You Are" Lennie Gallant If We Had a Fire (2009) Revenant (Canada)
- "Davey Jones" The Greencards, Fascination (April 2009)
- "Maybe You're Right" – The Rankin Family, These Are the Moments (2009)
- "You're Not Leaving Me" Martina McBride, Shine (March 2009) RCA/Sony
- "Found" Josh Gracin, Weren't We Crazy (2008)
- "Get Me Through December" Ali Matthews, Looking for Christmas (2008)
- "Get Me Through December" Jeni Fleming, December (2008)
- "Walk On the Moon" Great Big Sea, Fortune's Favour (2008) Warner Music Canada
- "538 Stars" Tara Oram, Chasing The Sun (October 2008) Open Road/Sugar Hill
- "538 Stars" Mary Elizabeth Murphy, Wild Blue Country (2008)
- "Might As Well Be Making Love" Jessica Simpson, Do You Know (September 2008) Epic, Columbia Nashville
- "That's What the Night Is For" Julianne Hough, Julianne Hough (2008) Mercury
- "The Hard Way" Sierra Hull Secrets (2008) Rounder
- "Too Good to Be True" Julianne Hough, Julianne Hough (2008) Mercury
- "All I Wanted Was a Slow Dance" Julianne Hough Julianne Hough (2008) Mercury
- "Chasing the Sun" The Barra MacNeils, The Barra MacNeils 20th Anniversary Collection (2007)
- "Haven't Got a Care" The Barra MacNeils, The Barra MacNeils 20th Anniversary Collection (2007)
- "Nothin Like an Ocean" The Rankin Family, Reunion (The Rankin Family Album) (2007) EMI
- "Midnight Oil" John Landry, Someday (2007)
- "Maybe You're Right" The Rankin Family, Reunion (2007)
- "Got to Leave Louisiana" Jimmy Rankin, Edge of Day (2007) Song Dog
- "Just a Dream" Carrie Underwood, Carnival Ride (October 2007) Arista Nashville
- "Get Out of This Town" Carrie Underwood, Carnival Ride (October 2007) Arista Nashville
- "Oh Love" Brad Paisley & Carrie Underwood, 5th Gear (June 2007) Arista Nashville
- "On Any Other Day" Bon Jovi, Lost Highway (June 2007) Island/Mercury
- "If I Had Your Name" Martina McBride, Waking Up Laughing (April 2007) RCA
- "Get Me Through December" Alison Krauss, A Hundred Miles or More: A Collection (April 2007) Rounder
- "Measure of a Man" Jack Ingram, This Is It (March 2007) Big Machine
- "Open Road" Whitney Duncan, Whitney Duncan (2007) Warner Bros.
- "Nothing Like An Ocean" The Rankin Family, Reunion (2007) LOADmusic
- "When I Said I Would" Whitney Duncan, Whitney Duncan (2007) Warner Bros.
- "(When) God Made Woman" Keith Urban, Love, Pain & the Whole Crazy Thing (November 2006) Capitol
- "Star" Shaye, Lake of Fire (2006), EMI Canada
- "Cry Baby" Carolyn Dawn Johnson, Love & Negotiation (2006) Dancing Lily Music
- "Words Get in the Way" Trace Adkins, Dangerous Man (August 2006) Capitol
- "Long Night" LeAnn Rimes, Whatever We Wanna (2006)
- "Save Myself" LeAnn Rimes, Whatever We Wanna (2006)
- "Seeing Things" Aaron Lines, Waitin on the Wonderful (2005)
- "Jesus, Take the Wheel" Carrie Underwood, Some Hearts (November 2005) Arista Nashville
- "Hurricane Jane" Colin Raye, Twenty Years and Change (October 2005) Aspirion
- "Paris" Faith Hill, Fireflies (August 2005) Warner Bros.
- "You or Somebody Like You" Keith Urban, Days Go By (May 2005) Capitol
- "Fear of Flying" Shelly Fairchild, Ride (May 2005) Sony
- "I Miss Manhattan" Louise Pitre Shattered (2004) The Orange Record Label
- "Mad Violet" Take Your Things and Go, Worry the Jury (2004)
- "Lucky Me" Great Big Sea, Something Beautiful (2004) Warner Music Canada
- "Let It Go" Great Big Sea, Something Beautiful (2004) Warner Music Canada
- "The Hard Way" Keith Urban, Be Here (September 2004) Capitol
- "My Name" George Canyon, One Good Friend (September 2004) Universal South
- "This Is How the West Was Won" Shaye, The Bridge (2003), EMI Canada
- "Is It Right" Damhnait Doyle Dav-net (2003) Turtlemusik
- "Now When the Rain Falls" Damhnait Doyle Dav-net (2003) Turtlemusik
- "Deal with God" Damhnait Doyle Dav-net (2003) Turtlemusik
- "Afterglow" Damhnait Doyle Dav-net (2003) Turtlemusik
- "Another California Song" Damhnait Doyle Dav-net (2003) Turtlemusik
- "One Last Goodbye" Richie Sambora, The Banger Sisters Soundtrack (2002)
- "Followed Her Around" – Jimmy Rankin, Song Dog (2001) Song Dog
- "In My Hands" Natalie MacMaster, In My Hands (1999) Rounder
- "Get Me Through December" Natalie MacMaster with Alison Krauss, In My Hands (1999) Rounder
- "MacDougall's Pride" Ashley MacIsaac, Hi How Are You Today? (1995) A&M
- "Sleepy Maggie" Ashley MacIsaac, Hi How Are You Today? (1995) A&M
- "King for a Day" Crush, Face in the Crowd (June 1995) Sonic
- "My Heart Beats For Love" Miley Cyrus, Can't Be Tamed (July 1995) Hollywood
- "The Real Thing" Realworld, Dig (1993) Jesse Dog
- "We All Need" Realworld, Dig (1993) Jesse Dog
- "She's Got It" Realworld, Dig (1993) Jesse Dog
- "Man with the Mink" Realworld, Dig (1993) Jesse Dog
- "Throwin It All Away" Realworld, Dig (1993) Jesse Dog
- "Angels" Realworld, Dig (1993) Jesse Dog
- "Sunday Rain" Realworld, Dig (1993) Jesse Dog

== Awards and nominations ==
- Cape Breton Music Hall of Fame
  - 2026 - Inductee
- AIMP Nashville Awards
  - 2017 – AIMP Publisher's Pick – "Wheels" (Nomination)
- Grammys
  - Grammy Awards of 2007 – Best Country Song, "Jesus, Take the Wheel" (WON)
  - Grammy Awards of 2007 – Song of the Year, "Jesus, Take the Wheel" (Nomination)
- Juno Awards
  - 2009 – Songwriter of The Year – For The Few and Far Between "Davey Jones"
  - 2009 – Songwriter of the Year "When I Said I Would – Duncan Whitney (Nomination)
  - 2007 – Songwriter of The Year, "Jesus, Take The Wheel" (WON)
  - 2005 – Songwriter of The Year, "Sunburn", "Paris" and "You (Or Somebody Like You)" (Nomination)
  - 2000 – Best Instrumental Album – In My Hands – Natalie MacMaster, (WON)
  - 1999 – Best Roots & Traditional Album – Solo – Stones (Nomination)
- CMA
  - 2006 Song of the Year for "Jesus, Take the Wheel" (WON)
- Nashville Songwriters Association
  - 2006 – International Songwriter Achievement Award "Jesus, Take the Wheel" (WON)
  - 2006 – International Song of the Year Award "Jesus, Take The Wheel" (WON)
- ASCAP Award
  - 2007 – Christian Award – Top 25 Song "Jesus, Take The Wheel" (WON)
  - 2006 Song of the Year "Jesus, Take The Wheel" (WON)
- Academy of Country Music Award
  - 2006 – Single of the Year, Carrie Underwood "Jesus, Take the Wheel" (WON)
  - 2006 – Song of The Year, Carrie Underwood "Jesus, Take The Wheel" (Nomination)
- Great American Song Contest
  - 2005 Pop/Contemporary, "Paris" (WON)
  - 2005 Pop/Contemporary "Sunburn" (WON)
- CCMA Award
  - 2006 – Songwriter of the Year, Carrie Underwood "Jesus, Take the Wheel" (WON)
  - 2006 – Songwriter of the Year, Carolyn Dawn Johnson "Crybaby" (Nomination)
  - 2005 – Single of the Year, George Canyon "My Name" (WON)
  - 2005 – Song of the Year, George Canyon "My Name" (WON)
  - 2000 – Vocal/Instrumental Collaboration "Get Me Through December" (WON)
- ECMA Awards
  - 2012 – Country Recording of the Year – Almost Beautiful (WON)
  - 2012 – Solo Recording of the Year – Almost Beautiful (WON)
  - 2009, 2005 "Sunburn", 2004 "King for a Day" (Crush), 2002, 2001 "Get Me Through December", 2000 "Sorry" – Songwriter of the Year (WON)
  - 2009, 2005 "Jesus, Take The Wheel", 2000 "Sorry" – Single of the Year (WON)
  - 2009 – FACTOR Recording of the Year – For the Few and Far Between (Nomination)
  - 2009 – Male Solo Recording of the Year – For the Few and Far Between (Nomination)
  - 2009 – Pop Recording of the Year – For the Few and Far Between (Nomination)
  - 2005 – Album of the Year – Sunburn (WON)
  - 2005 – Male Artist of the Year – Sunburn (WON)
  - 2005 – Pop Recording of the Year – Sunburn (WON)
  - 2000 – Video of the Year "Sorry" (WON)
  - 1999 – New Artist of the Year (WON)
- International Songwriting Competition
  - 2008 – Folk Category "Davey Jones" (WON)
  - 2005 – Performance Category "Paris" (WON)
- Music Nova Scotia Awards (MIANS)
  - 2004 – Album of the Year – Sunburn (WON)
  - 2004, 2000 – Male Artist of the Year (WON)
  - 2004 – Pop/Rock Album of the Year – Sunburn (WON)
  - 2004 – SOCAN Songwriter of the Year (WON)
  - 2003 – Producer of the Year (WON)
  - 2000 – Songwriter of the Year – Stones (WON)
  - 1999 – Producer of the Year – In My Hands (Natalie MacMaster (WON)
- SOCAN Awards
  - 2019 – SOCAN No. 1 Award, "Hangups" (Scott Helman) (WON)
  - 2006 – Most Country Airplay, "My Name" (WON)
  - 2006 – Outstanding Success Airplay, "Jesus, Take The Wheel" (WON)
  - 2002 – Most Country Airplay "Followed Her Around" (Jimmy Rankin) (WON)
- Canadian Radio Music Awards
  - 2000 – Pop Adult Best Solo Artist (Nomination)
- John Lennon Songwriting Contest
  - 2000 – Pop Category Finalist "Sorry"
- Benelux International Song & Cultural Festival
  - Best Entry – Canada
- Cape Breton University
  - 2013 – Received a Doctor of Letters, honoris causa (honorary degree)
