= Neon Dreams =

Canadian alt-pop duo

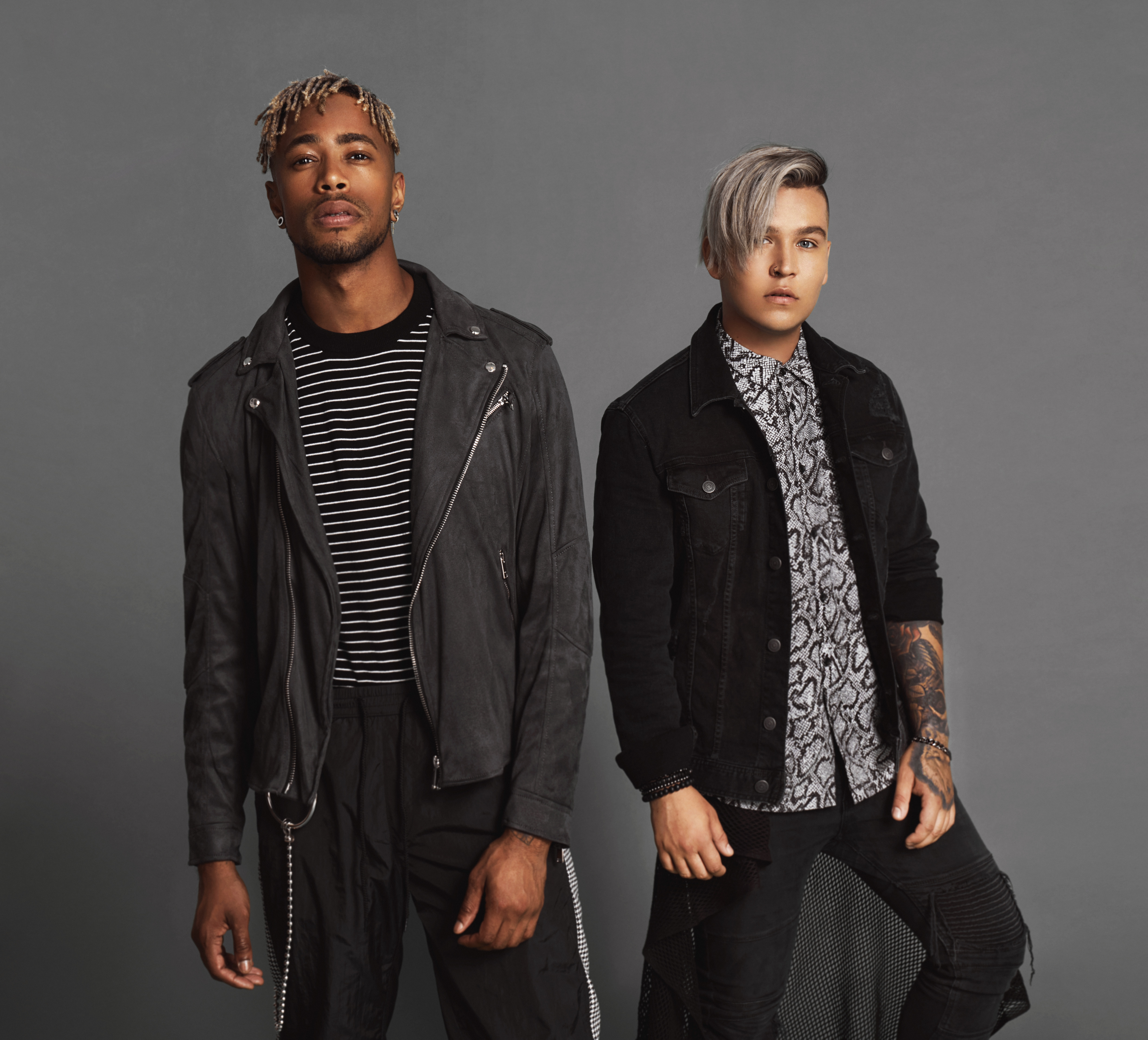
- Frank Kadillac (left) and Adrian Morris (right)

Background information
- Origin: Halifax, Nova Scotia, Canada
- Genres: Alt-Pop
- Years active: 2015–present
- Members: Frank Kadillac; Adrian Morris
- Past members: Corey Lerue; Matt Gats
- Website: neondreams.ca

Neon Dreams is a Canadian alt-pop duo consisting of vocalist Frank Kadillac and drummer Adrian Morris. They write and produce their own music with long-time collaborator Corey Lerue. They defy genre pigeonholing, as they draw freely upon pop, rock, folk, EDM, hip-hop, and reggae elements. Their most successful songs are "Marching Bands," "Survive", "High School Dropout", "Life Without Fantasies", and "Little Dance".

== Background ==
=== Musical style ===
The band reflects a diverse musical style combining EDM with live instrumental and vocals. They create a unique form of alternative pop music taking influence from rock, folk, EDM, hip-hop, and reggae elements. They began performing together in high school at the age of 16. They are known for their high-energy live shows with both members playing multiple instruments throughout the set.

== Career ==
The band started in 2015 consisting of lead vocalist Frank Kadillac (born Jahmal Wellington), DJ/vocalist Corey LeRue, guitarist Matt Gats (Matt Sampson), and drummer Adrian Morris. They met in high school where Corey was a DJ while the other members were originally into rock. They spent their formative years pushing boundaries and experimenting with different musical styles. They first got recognition from rapper Waka Flocka Flame in January 2015 when they remixed his track "Hard In The Paint".

Their sound evolved into electronic with pop and rock elements as they began writing and performing. On September 4, 2015, they released their first track, "Love Experts". It was debuted on Bell Media stations across Canada and quickly picked up by other Top-40 stations nationwide. It climbed its way onto Billboard's CHR Top 40 chart and iTunes' Top 10 electronic chart.

Their debut EP To You was released on August 26, 2016, and accumulated over 15 million streams. It included the group's gold single "Marching Bands," featuring Kardinal Offishall. They won Best New Artist (Dance/Urban/Rhythmic) at the 2017 Canadian Radio Music Awards, beating out prominent nominees Tory Lanez and PartyNextDoor. They were also winners of the 2017 Allan Slaight JUNO Master Class.

In 2017, Corey Lerue left the band to run their Halifax-based independent label Dreaming Out Loud. The label signed a distribution imprint deal with Warner Music Canada. Lerue continues to write and produce for the band. In 2018, Matt Gats left the band to take over label and managing duties. On September 22, 2017, the band released Wolf, Princess & Me, their now unavailable second EP.

The duo released their debut album, Sweet Dreams till Sunbeams, on July 25, 2019. The 9 track album was inspired by Kadillac's visit to a healing retreat in Sedona, Arizona, where he was encouraged to open up about his troubled childhood. The album featured the radio hit "High School Dropout," which reached #20 on Canadian Top 40.

Neon Dreams won the JUNO Award for Breakthrough Group of the Year in 2020 and performed "We Were Kings" on the broadcast. Billboard said afterwards, "Neon Dreams capped a career-year with a Juno Award and a special performance that confirmed the alt-pop duo's elevation to the big stage." After winning the JUNO Award for Breakthrough Group of the Year in 2020, Neon Dreams continued releasing studio albums. The duo released Love Child Baby Dolphin in 2023, followed by The Good, The True, And The Beautiful in 2024. In 2025, they released 10 Years, marking a decade since the group’s formation.

== Discography ==
=== Studio albums ===
- Sweet Dreams till Sunbeams (2019)
  - "Life Without Fantasies"
  - "High School Dropout"
  - "We Were Kings"
  - "About you..."
  - "HIT Like This"
  - "If not now, when...?"
  - "Sweet Dreams till Sunbeams"
  - "TY"
  - "Belong"
- The Happiness Of Tomorrow (2020)
  - "Lifestyles of the Broke and Nameless"
  - "Sick of Feeling Useless"
  - "House Party"
  - "Don't Go Hating Me Now"
  - "All the People"
  - "I'm With You"
  - "The Happiness of Tomorrow"
- Love Child Baby Dolphin (2023)
  - "Little Dance"
  - "ITS ALL GOOD"
  - "Let's Not Forget"
  - "Mama You're Always Perfect"
  - "The Other Side of You"
  - "This Is It"
  - "Love Child Baby Dolphin"
  - "TY2"
  - "Blue Butterfly"
- The Good, The True And The Beautiful (2024)
  - "Big Ocean"
  - "Jonah"
  - "The Art Of Letting Go" (feat. Matthew Mole)
  - "Long Way From Home (feat. Levi Rowan)"
  - "You Ain't Gotta Say Much"
  - "Masterpiece"
  - "The Good, The True And The Beautiful"
  - "Thankful for You (feat. Elias Njovu)"
  - "Stardust"
  - "Adam And Eve"
  - "Can't Let Go"
  - "War From My Pillowcase"
- 10 Years (2025)

=== Extended plays ===
- To You (2016)
  - "Best of Your Heart"
  - "Find a Way"
  - "If I Say"
  - "Marching Band" (feat. Kardinal Offishall)
  - "The Truth"
  - "To You" (feat. Lee Fraser)
  - "Wallpaper"
- Wolf, Princess & Me (2017)
  - "Intro"
  - "Wolf, Princess & Me"
  - "Rescue"
  - "Power"
  - "Deep Water"
  - "Insane"
  - "Do What You Want"

== Tours ==
- To You Tour (2016)
- Cageless Tour w/ Hedley (2018)
- Never Coming Down Tour w/ Ria Mae (2018)
- Sweet Dreams till Sunbeams Tour (2019)
- Wanted Tour w/ Tyler Shaw (2019)
- Rattlesnake Tour w/ The Strumbellas (2020)
- South Africa Tour (2021)

Following 2020, Neon Dreams continued to perform extensively, including international live performances throughout 2023–2025.

== Awards and nominations ==
Year	Award	Category	Nominated	Result	Ref
2016	Best of Halifax Readers's Choice Awards	Best Electronic Artist / Band	Neon Dreams	Won	
2016	Nova Scotia Music Awards	Electronic Artist of the Year	Neon Dreams	Won	
2017	Juno Awards	Allan Slaight JUNO Master Class	Neon Dreams	Won	
2017	Canadian Radio Music Awards	Best New Group or Solo Artist: Dance/Urban/Rhythmic	"Marching Bands"	Won	
2020	Juno Awards	Breakthrough Group of the Year	Neon Dreams	Won	

== Band members ==
- Frank Kadillac – vocals, guitar, ukulele
- Adrian Morris – drums, acoustic guitar, programming
