= Lennie Gallant Live =

Lennie Gallant's LIVE is the fifth album from the French-Canadian singer/songwriter, and also his first live album, released in 2000. The songs were recorded at three concerts held in November 1999. At the time, tracks 1, 3, 5, 6 and 7 were previously unrecorded songs. All other songs had studio versions previously recorded on other albums: tracks 8 and 15 from Breakwater, track 13 from Believing in Better, tracks 2 and 4 from The Open Window, and tracks 9, 10, 11 and 12 from Lifeline. Track 7 showed up on his 2005 album, When We Get There.

== Track listing ==
1. The Pull of the Fundy Tide
2. Which Way Does The River Run
3. La Valse des Vagues
4. Peter's Dream
5. Part of Me
6. Coal Black
7. Pieces of You
8. Destination (Train Song)
9. Slow Boat
10. Lifeline
11. The Band's Still Playing
12. Meet Me at the Oasis
13. Man of Steel
14. Sound Effects - Waves
15. La Tempete (Bonus Track)

== Personnel ==
- Lennie Gallant acoustic guitar, bodhran, harmonica, vocals
- Chris Church violin, percussion, vocals
- Adam Dowling drums, percussion, vocals
- Asif Illyas electric guitar, 2nd acoustic (track 7), vocals
- Shehab Illyas bass guitar, vocals
- John Scott accordion on tracks 3 and 11
