= Passenger (Tara MacLean album) =

Studio album by Tara MacLean
- Released: February 29, 2000
- Recorded: 1999
- Genre: Contemporary folk
- Length: 54:21
- Label: Capitol, Nettwerk Records
- Producer: Bill Bell, Malcolm Burn

Tara MacLean chronology
If You See Me (1996)	Passenger (2000)	Signs Of Life (2007)

Professional ratings
Review scores
Source	Rating
Allmusic	link

Passenger is the second album by Canadian singer-songwriter Tara MacLean, released in 2000.

== Track listing ==
1. "Jericho" – 3:34
  Tara MacLean
2. "Divided" – 4:40
  Tara MacLean, Bill Bell
3. "If I Fall" – 4:09
  Tara MacLean
4. "Reach" – 4:54
  Tara MacLean, Bill Bell
5. "Dry Land" – 3:30
  Tara MacLean
6. "Jordan" – 5:20
  Tara MacLean
7. "Passenger" – 4:00
  Tara MacLean, Bill Bell
8. "Settling" – 4:05
  Tara MacLean
9. "Poor Boy" – 3:53
  Tara MacLean, Bill Bell
10. "La Tempete" – 3:51
  Lennie Gallant
11. "Blinded" – 3:07
  Tara MacLean
12. "Higher" – 5:06
  Tara MacLean, Bill Bell
13. "Shakota" [Hidden Track] – 4:12
  Tara MacLean, Bill Bell

== Personnel ==
- Tara MacLean – vocals (1, 2, 3, 4, 5, 6, 7, 8, 9, 10, 11, 12, 13), piano (1, 2, 3), acoustic guitar (5, 6)
- Bill Bell – guitar (1, 2, 3, 4, 5, 6, 7, 8, 9, 10, 12), Programming (1, 2, 3, 4, 7, 9, 13), backing vocals (6, 8, 13), mandolin (7), bass (8), wurlitzer (9)
- Malcolm Burn – Djembe (6), backing vocals (6), Omnichord (10), bass guitar (3, 5, 7), drum thing (5), everything else (4), Rhodes (2)
- Mark Jowett – guitar (4)
- Robbie Buchanan – piano (8)
- Alex Lifeson – guitar (3)
- Allen Stepansky – cello (9)
- Andrew McLean – Tablas (7)
- Astrid Williamson – piano (10)
- Carl Petzelt – B3 (7)
- Carlo Nuccio – drums (1, 2, 3, 4, 6, 9, 10)
- Conway Kuo – violin (3, 4, 11), viola (3, 4, 11)
- David Rolfe – guitar (3)
- Erik Friedlander – cello (9)
- Everyone else at the party – vibe (13)
- Jeff Treffinger – Omnichord (6)
- Karl Berger – string arrangements (3, 4, 11)
- Kathie Sinsabaugh – viola (3, 4, 11)
- Michelle Kinney – cello (3, 4, 11)
- Mike Skinkis – additional percussion (6) Percussion (7)
- Pauline Kim – violin (3, 4, 11)
- Peter Martin Weimer – violin (3, 4, 11)
- Rene Coman – bass guitar (1, 2, 4, 6, 9, 10)
- Robert Rinehart – viola (9)
- Sandra Park – violin (9)
- Sharon Yimada – violin (9)
- Shaye Martirano – backing vocals (13)
- Simon Collins – Djembe (13), shakers (13)
- Stephen Barber – string arrangement (9)
- Steve Gorn – Bansuri (12)
- Veda Hille – piano (11)
- Xavier Sharpenpier – Akai trumpet (1, 2, 3, 4, 5, 6, 7)

== Production ==
- Produced by Bill Bell (8, 13) Malcolm Burn (5, 6, 10, 11) Malcolm Burn, and Bill Bell (1, 2, 3, 4, 7, 9, 12)
- Mixed by Jack Joseph Puig (1, 2, 3, 4, 6, 7) Brian Malouf (5, 8, 9, 10, 11, 12), and Bill Bell (13)
- Jack Joseph Puig Mixed at Ocean Way Recordings, Los Angeles; assisted by Jim Champagne, Richard Ash, David Sessions, Dan Chase
- Brian Malouf Mixed at Electric Lady Studios, New York; assisted by Mike Tocci
- Bill Bell Mixed at Home (13)
- Recorded by Malcolm Burn at Clouet St. Studio, New Orleans; engineered by Carl Petzelt; additional engineering by Zach Bulos
- Recorded by Malcolm Burn at Dreamland Studio, Woodstock, New York; assisted by Suzanne Kappa (11, 12, strings on 3, 4)
- Recorded by John Leventhal at Sear Sound, New York; engineered by Todd Schick; assisted by Todd Parker
- Recorded by Bill Bell at Home (13) and produced at All Locations
