= Holy Tears =

Holy Tears may refer to:

- "Holy Tears", song by Isis from album In the Absence of Truth
- "Holy Tears", song by Tara MacLean from album Silence
