= Ghost Ship of Northumberland Strait =

Mythical ghost ship of Canadian folklore

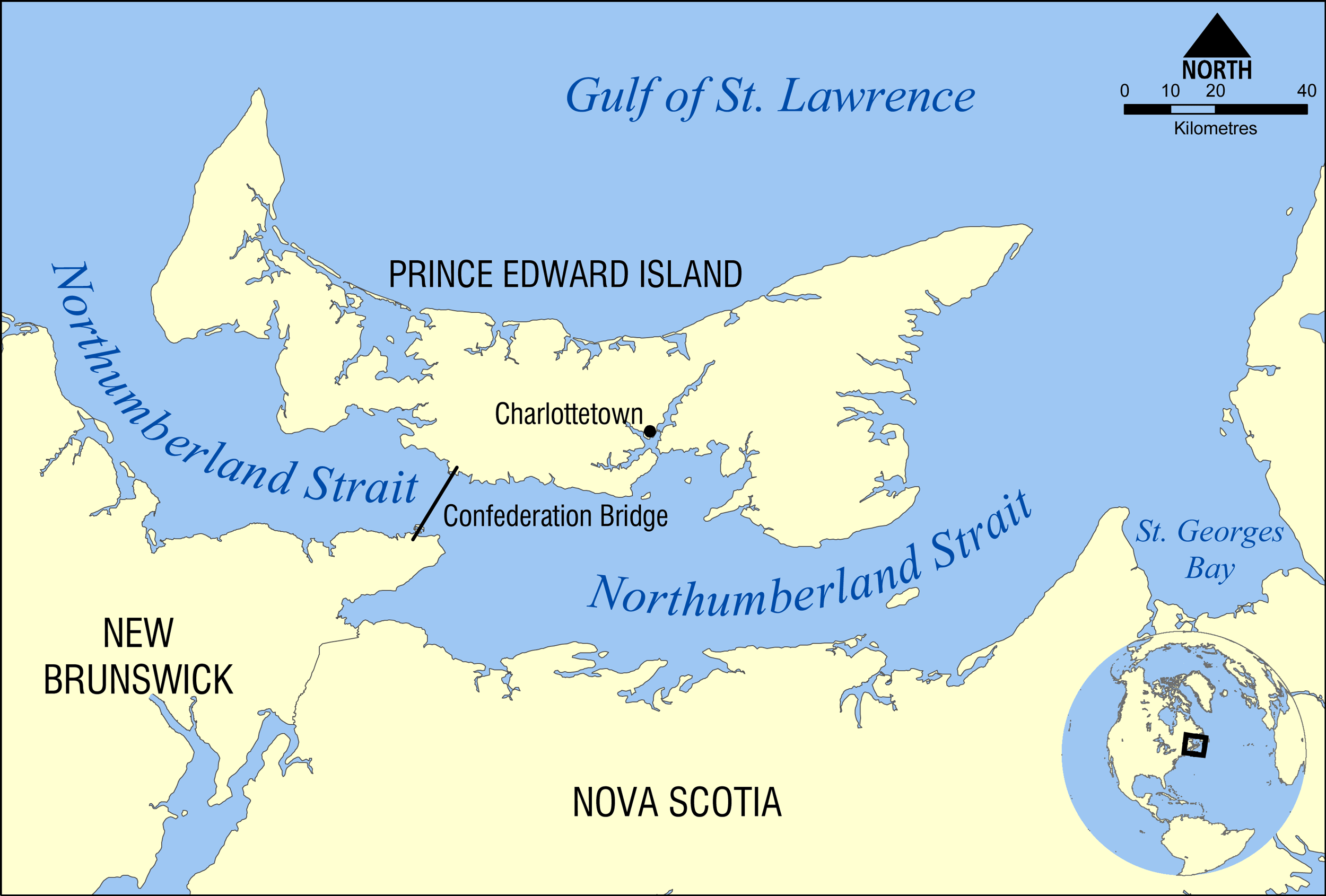
Map of the Northumberland Strait.

In Canadian ghostlore, the Ghost Ship of Northumberland Strait is a ghost ship said to sail ablaze within the Northumberland Strait, the body of water that separates Prince Edward Island from Nova Scotia and New Brunswick in Eastern Canada.

== History ==
The legend of a ghost ship in Northumberland Strait dates back at least 200 years, and it is typically described as a beautiful schooner that has three or four masts with pure white sails, all of which are said to become completely engulfed in flames as onlookers watch. The Northumberland Strait separates Prince Edward Island from New Brunswick and Nova Scotia, and according to local folklore, the ghost ship appears before a northeast wind, and is a forewarning of a storm.

A number of legends and ghost stories exist that describe sightings of the ghost ship over the years and include descriptions of distinctive outlines of the ship's masts and phantom crew members climbing them before the vessel supposedly either completely burns, sinks or vanishes." According to legend, in 1900, a group of sailors boarded a small rowboat in Charlottetown Harbour and raced toward the phantom ship to rescue the crew only to have the ship vanish. In January 2008, 17-year-old Mathieu Giguere told a local newspaper he believed he saw the legendary phantom ship in the Tatamagouche Bay, describing it as a "bright white and gold ship". Tatamagouche Mountain resident Melvin Langille also claims he saw the ship one night in October, explaining, "I believe in all that stuff and I don't know what else it would be."

In 2015, the Canadian Hydrographic Service discovered an unidentified wooden shipwreck in Pictou Harbour. The 60-metre (200 ft) vessel sits upright in 12–15 metres (39–49 ft) of water, featuring large, intact wooden propellers and signs of fire damage.

== Natural explanations ==
In 1905, New Brunswick scientist William Francis Ganong proposed that the legend may have arisen due to natural electrical phenomena such as St. Elmo's Fire that had been subject to "interpretation as the flaming rigging of a ship." Other explanations suggest that the illusion may have been created by a bank of fog reflecting moonlight.

== Music and popular culture ==
The ghost ship has become more widely known in recent years in part due to a popular song by Lennie Gallant, a Canadian singer-songwriter from Rustico, Prince Edward Island, along with a reference in the podcast Alice Isn't Dead. This song alludes to the folklore of this legendary ship: − "There's a burst of flame and a flash of light/And there on the tide is a frightening sight/As a tall ship all aflame lights up the sky/Tales of the phantom ship, from truck to keel in flames/She sails the wide Northumberland Strait/No one knows her name." It debuted in his 1988 album, Breakwater, and is called "Tales of the Phantom Ship".

In June 2014, Canada Post issued a special stamp depicting the Northumberland Strait ghost ship. The stamp was issued on Friday the 13th as part of a series of Canadian ghost story stamps.
