= Tara MacLean =

Canadian musician

- Born: Tara Margaret Charity MacLean; October 25, 1973 (age 52)
- Origin: Charlottetown, Prince Edward Island, Canada
- Genres: Folk; trip hop; pop
- Occupations: Musician; singer; composer
- Instruments: Vocals; guitar; piano
- Years active: 1995–present
- Labels: Nettwerk; Capitol Records; EMI Music Canada; Sony/ATV
- Website: www.taramacleanmusic.com

Tara Margaret Charity MacLean (born October 25, 1973) is an Irish-Canadian singer, songwriter, best-selling author and playwright. Her songs as a solo artist include "Evidence", "If I Fall", and "Sparrow". She was a member of the Juno nominated Atlantic Canadian group, Shaye with Kim Stockwood and Damhnait Doyle from 2002 to 2007. Her best selling memoir, Song of the Sparrow (HarperCollins) debuted at #4 for Canadian non-fiction.

== Early life and education ==
MacLean is the daughter of Sharlene MacLean, an actress, and Danny Costain, a singer and dancer from British Columbia. She was influenced by her stepfather Marty Reno, a songwriter and guitarist with Canadian recording star Gene MacLellan. She was born and raised in Charlottetown, Prince Edward Island on the east coast of Canada, and is the eldest of four children. All four were pulled from their burning home in May 1987 by Constable David Cheverie, who was awarded for bravery and received the Cross of Valour for saving their lives. She moved to British Columbia when she was 13 years old.

MacLean lived in Victoria, British Columbia, and graduated from Mount Douglas Secondary School in 1991.

== Career ==
Nettwerk Records discovered MacLean singing on a ferry between Victoria, British Columbia and Salt Spring Island. She signed to Nettwerk Records in April 1995 after moving to Vancouver to record her song "Let Her Feel the Rain" for Lit from Within, a Nettwerk Records benefit compilation for rape crisis centers. That song was also placed on a Nettwerk compilation titled Slowbrew, and it received some radio airplay. Her representing agents are S.L. Feldman's in Canada and Little Big Man in the U.S. She is signed to Sony Music Publishing Canada.

Her first live appearance in Vancouver was at Nettwerk Record's 10 Year Anniversary Show at the Vogue Theater. MacLean made an impact opening for the Dave Matthews Band and she appeared at the East Coast Music Awards where she sang with Marty Reno and Lennie Gallant as a tribute to Gene McLellan.

=== Silence ===
In October 1995, MacLean went to San Francisco to record her debut album Silence at Brilliant Studios with producer Norm Kerner with additional recording in Vancouver.

MacLean toured to promote Silence for over two years, including opening slots for Ashley MacIsaac, Barenaked Ladies, Dave Matthews Band, Paula Cole, Ron Sexsmith, Tom Cochrane, and The Cure, as well as eight dates on the Lilith Fair tour. The album sold over 20,000 copies in the United States.

In 1997, MacLean released a five-song EP of live, remixed and re-recorded songs called If You See Me. MacLean embarked on a national club tour to promote the EP, performing as a duo with guitarist Bill Bell. She was named Best New Solo Artist in the Contemporary Hit Radio category at the Canadian Radio Music Awards in 1997. She joined Capitol Records for her major label release.

Her version of the folk song Rattlesnake Mountain, also known as "On Springfield Mountain", was featured during the closing credits of the 1997 movie Inventing the Abbotts.

=== Passenger ===
MacLean's second full-length album was called Passenger. It was recorded in New Orleans and produced by Malcolm Burn (Daniel Lanois) and then husband Bill Bell (Tom Cochrane, Danko Jones). It was released in October 1999 by Nettwerk Records in Canada and Capitol Records in America. MacLean promoted Passenger in Canada, America and Asia for 18 months. "If I Fall" and "Divided" were both released as singles. Live from Austin and Live from Roots Lodge were released as two special live EPs. "Settling" was also released in Taiwan as the album's third single. She toured extensively, opening for Dido on her first U.S. tour.

To support Passenger, MacLean joined Kendall Payne, Shannon McNally, and Amy Correia for a 21-stop Capitol Records sponsored The Girls Room Tour across America. Admission to The Girls Room shows were free, and the tour donated $1,000 to a women's charity in each city the tour visits. Passenger sold over 50,000 copies. She also appeared on Late Night with Conan O'Brien and had a Cameo in the Jerry Bruckheimer film Coyote Ugly, and USA Network's Good vs Evil.

MacLean left Capitol Records in 2001.

MacLean gave birth to her first child Sophia Madrien Soleil Bell in 2001 in Oakville, Ontario.

=== Shaye ===
MaLean collaborated with fellow artists Kim Stockwood and Damhnait Doyle. The resulting group was named Shaye. The name was a tribute to Maclean's sister who died in a car accident in 2002.

Their debut album The Bridge was released in October 2003 on EMI Canada. "Happy Baby" the lead single, was nominated for Single of the Year at the 2004 Juno Awards and won the Canadian Radio music award. This was followed up by "Beauty" in January 2005. They represented Canada at the World Expo in Nagoya, Japan that Spring.

In 2006, she gave birth to her second child Stella Heather Sky Grand in Toronto, where she was residing with her partner, then husband, Ted Grand (director and co-founder of Modo Yoga.)

Their 2006 follow up Lake of Fire was released on EMI Canada. It was exclusively available on iTunes in November 2006, then released physically in February 2007.

=== Wake ===
MacLean's third full-length release Wake was released on April 22, 2008, and is available to purchase as CD or MP3 from Nettwerk.

On October 8, 2007, MacLean announced that she was leaving Shaye due to parental commitments and the desire to pursue a solo career.

She had her third child, Flora Samadhi Shaye Grand in April 2008.

=== Atlantic Blue ===
MacLean's fourth studio album Atlantic Blue was released on May 22, 2017, to project supporters on PledgeMusic on digital, CD and vinyl. As part of the promotion of the project, an EP called Evidence was released on NoiseTrade as a free download, which featured a mix of released and previously unreleased tracks.

Atlantic Blue is a show and an album celebrating of Canadian east coast songwriters and contains covers of songs by Gene MacLellan, Gordie Sampson, Lennie Gallant, The Rankin Family, Rita MacNeil, Ron Hynes, Sarah McLachlan, Shaye, Stompin' Tom Connors, and others.

=== Deeper ===
Tara MacLean's album Deeper, released in 2019, marked a significant turning point in her career. It was her first collection of entirely original material in over a decade (since 2008's Wake) and was released independently.

The album was co-produced by Tara MacLean and Dennis Ellsworth and recorded at The Hill Sound Studio in Prince Edward Island.

=== Sparrow and Song of the Sparrow ===
Song of the Sparrow, and its accompanying soundtrack album, Sparrow, in early 2023, serves as a definitive statement on the intersection of trauma and triumph, utilizing both the written word and aural reimaginings to catalog a twenty-five-year journey through the international music industry. Released on March 14, 2023, by HarperCollins Canada, Song of the Sparrow promptly became a national best seller.

== Discography ==
=== Solo ===
Year	Title	Label	Type	Notes
1996	Silence	Nettwerk	Studio Album	Debut Album.
1996	Evidence	Nettwerk	Single	
1997	If You See Me	Nettwerk	EP	
2000	Passenger	Nettwerk/Capitol Records	Studio Album	Produced by Malcolm Burn.
2000	If I Fall	Nettwerk	Single	
2000	Divided	Nettwerk	Single	
2000	Live from Austin	Capitol Records	Live EP	Limited Edition, sold with Passenger
2000	Live from Roots Lodge	Capitol Records	Live EP	Limited Edition, sold with Passenger
2007	Signs of Life	Nettwerk	EP	Digital only.
2008	Wake	Nettwerk	Studio Album	Released on a digital and CD.
2017	Evidence	Independent	EP	Digital only. Released on NoiseTrade.
2017	Atlantic Blue	Independent	Studio Album	Released on digital, CD and vinyl (some formats may be exclusive to her PledgeMusic project supporters).
2019	Lovesong	Independent	Single	Released on digital.
2019	Ghosting Me	Independent	Single	Released on digital.
2020	Deeper	Independent	Studio Album	Released on digital and CD.
2023	Sparrow	Independent	Studio Album	Released on digital and CD.
2024	Live in My Hometown	Independent	EP Live	Released on digital.

=== Collaboration ===
Year	Title	Label	Type	Notes
2006	Songs For Sunset (Amy Sky)	Solitudes	Album	Released on CD
2018	Song for a Winter's Night (Adam Brazier)		Single	Released on digital
2020	This Storm (Catherine MacLellan)	Catherine MacLellan	EP	Released on digital
2023	Kiss in December (feat. Catherine MacLellan & KINLEY)	Turtlemusik	Single	Released on digital.

=== Soundtracks ===
- Inventing the Abbotts soundtrack ("On Springfield Mountain" 1997)
- kissed soundtrack ("That's Me" 1997)
- Due south vol.2 soundtrack ("Holy Tears" 1998)
- Teaching Mrs. Tingle soundtrack ("At Seventeen," "If I Fall" 1999)
- Over Canada An Aerial Adventure soundtrack ("If You Could" 1999)
- Bounce soundtrack ("Divided" 2000)
- Meteor Garden soundtrack ("Settling" 2001)
- Just a Kiss soundtrack ("Divided" 2002)

=== Compilations ===
- Bears – Nomad Music Collection ("Clayoquot Song" 1995)
- Decadence – Nettwerk ("Silence (Demo)" 1995)
- Slow Brew – Nettwerk ("Let Her Feel The Rain" 1995)
- Lit From Within – Various Artists ("Let Her Feel the Rain", 1995)
- Lilith Fair 98 A Starbucks Blend – Various Artists ("Evidence (Chris Lord-Alge Mix)", 1998)
- Lilith Fair: A Celebration Of Women In Music – Lilith Fair ("Hold Me, Jordan" 1998)
- Faith & Healing – Various Artists ("More", 1998)
- 30 Hour Famine – Various Artists ("Holy Tears", 1998)
- 99.99997% of the world plays without a contract. – Various Artists ("Evidence (Chris Lord-Alge Remix)", 1998)
- My Sister Sings – Various Artists ("If You Could", 1998)
- A Christmas To Remember – Various Artists ("Light of the Stable" 1998)
- Cafe Music Network Selects 2000 Vol. 6 – Various Artists ("Divided", 2000)
- Live From Studio B Vol. 1 – Various Artists ("If I Fall", 2000)
- After the Fair 21st Century Women – Various Artists ("Let Her Feel the Rain", 2000)
- Women & Songs 4 – Various Artists ("If I Fall", 2000)
- Much More Music – Various Artists ("Divided", 2000)
- Songs of the Season – WXRT 93.1 FM/Borders Compilation ("Silent Night" 2000)
- Christmas Songs Nettwerk ("Winter Wonderland" 2000)
- Women & Songs Christmas – Various Artists ("Winter Wonderland", 2003)
- Images of Christmas – John McDermott and friends ("Winter Wonderland" with Shaye 2005)
- Borrowed Tunes II: A Tribute to Neil Young – Various Artists ("Natural Beauty" 2007)
- Christmas in Canada – Various Artists ("Winter Wonderland" with Shaye 2007)
- Abrazos 2008 – Various Artists ("Moment for Mercy" 2008 in aid of www.cancerbenefit.org)
- Sirènes – The Beauty of the Female Voice – Various Artists ("Here and Now", 2008)

=== Guest appearances ===
- Simple Things – Jim Brickman ("You" on Canadian release only 2001)
- Earthbound – Paul Schwartz Project ("Earthbound" 2002)
- Christmas Harmony – Dan Gibson/Solitudes (with Amy Sky 2004)
- Christmas Grace (Hallmark release) – Dan Gibson/Solitudes (with Amy Sky 2004)
- Songs For Sunset – Dan Gibson/Solitudes (with Amy Sky 2006)
- Valentine (Borders Exclusive) – Jim Brickman ("You" 2006)

=== Backing vocals ===
- Roaring From The Soul of a Lion – Peter Prince (1993)
- Whispering Rain – Peter Prince ("Sweet Surrender" 1995)
- Be Here Now – Suzanne Little ("Still With Me" 1995)
- Don't Argue With Her – Annette Ducharme ("Polarize" 1996)
- Songs of a Circling Spirit – Tom Cochrane ("All The King's Men" 1997)
- All of Who You Are – Simon Collins ("Ocean Deep Inside" 1999)
- X-Ray Sierra – Tom Cochrane ("Stonecutter's Arms" 1999)
- Trapeze: The Collection – Tom Cochrane ("Pictures From The Edge" 2001)
- Born a Lion – Danko Jones – ("Love is Unkind" 2002)
- Light Dance – Peter Prince (2002)
- Davnet – Damhnait Doyle ("Another California Song" 2003)
- Waves – The Devlins ("Coming Alive" 2005)
- Images of Christmas – John McDermott and friends ("Christmas All The Time" with Tom Cochrane 2005)
- I Love Santa (Kim Stockwood album)|I Love Santa – Kim Stockwood ("Silent Night" 2006)
- The Melody and the Energetic Nature of Volume – Evans Blue ("Beg," "Possession" 2006)

== Videos ==
=== From her releases ===
- Evidence (1996)
- Divided (1996)
- If I Fall (2000)
- Song for a Winter's Night (2020)
- If I Fall (Sparrow Version, 2022)
- Sparrow (2023)
- Let Her Feel The Rain (2023)
- Lay Here in the Dark (2023)
- That's Me (2023)

=== Documentaries ===
- Passenger - The Epk (2000, produced & directed by David Palmer)
- Secret Songs Season 1, Episode 6 (2022, by Confound Films)

=== Shaye ===
- Happy Baby (2003)
- Beauty (2004)

=== Other appearances ===
- Another California Song (Damhnait Doyle, 2003, Plays Abducted character)

== Awards and nominations ==
=== Civic and Humanitarian Awards ===
- 2019 – Senate of Canada medal

=== Solo Works ===
- 1997 – Won – Best New Solo Artist for Canadian Radio Music Awards
- 1998 – Nominee – Female recording of the Year for East Coast Music Awards
- 2020 – Won – Songwriter of the Year (Deeper) for SOCAN
- 2020 – Won – Solo Recording of the Year (Deeper) for SOCAN
- 2020 – Nominee – East Coast Music Awards Pop Album of the Year
- 2023 – Won – Single of the Year "Sparrow" for Music PEI
- 2023 – Won – Song of the Year "This Storm" (w/ Catherine MacLellan) for Music PEI
- 2024 – Awarded – Stompin' Tom Award for East Coast Music Awards
- 2024 – Nominee – Album of the Year "Sparrow" for East Coast Music Awards
- 2024 – Nominee – Contemporary Roots Recording "Sparrow" for East Coast Music Awards
- 2025 – Won – Contemporary Roots Recording of the year "Live in My Hometown" for Music PEI

=== With Shaye ===
See Shaye Awards and nominations

== Bibliography ==
- Song of The Sparrow (2023), ISBN 9781443465120, Harper Collins Canada
