= Lake of Fire (album) =

Studio album by Shaye
- Released: November 7, 2006 (iTunes); February 6, 2007 (CD)
- Recorded: 2005–2006
- Genre: Contemporary folk
- Label: EMI Music Canada
- Producer: Jay Joyce

Shaye chronology
The Bridge (2003)	Lake of Fire (2006)

Lake of Fire is the second and final studio album by Canadian band Shaye, released in 2006. About six months after the release of this album, Tara MacLean left the band and the band subsequently broke up. The album reached No. 92 on the Canadian album charts.

== Background and release ==
Although the album was finished recording in 2006 it was only released on iTunes in November 2006. The physical CD Digipak not released until February 6, 2007 to coincide with a television show about the band. The music on this album was featured on the four-part reality television series Shaye, This Is It!, produced by Breakthrough Films & Television and was aired on Global TV in May 2007. By the time the series was aired on E! Television that fall, the band had broken up and lost their record deal. In early 2008 the series was nominated for an East Coast Music Association Industry Award for "Broadcast of the Year"

In addition to the songs written by Shaye, the album features songs written by notable Canadian songwriters Gordie Sampson and Ron Sexsmith.

== Track listing ==
1. "I Don't Wanna Die Today" (Kim Stockwood, Damhnait Doyle, Tara MacLean, Jay Joyce) — 3.42
2. "Lake of Fire" (Stockwood, Doyle, MacLean, Joyce) — 3.14
3. "We Will Not Be Lovers" (Mike Scott) — 5.06
4. "Stay" (Stockwood, Doyle, MacLean, Joyce) — 3.19
5. "We are Water" (Patty Griffin) — 5.11
6. "This is the Moment" (Stockwood, Doyle, MacLean, Joyce) — 3.19
7. "Ocean of Sorrows" (Stockwood, Doyle, MacLean) — 2.15
8. "Someway, Somehow" (Ron Sexsmith) — 3.39
9. "You're Not Alone" (Stockwood, Doyle, Joyce) — 3.27
10. "So Far Gone" (Stockwood, Doyle, MacLean, Joyce) — 4.09
11. "I Can't Say" (Dan Wilson, Jill Sobule) — 3.36
12. "Star" (Stockwood, Doyle, MacLean, Gordie Sampson) — 3.39
13. "Tupelo Honey" (Van Morrison) — 5.18

== Personnel ==
- Tara MacLean — vocals
- Damhnait Doyle — vocals
- Kim Stockwood — vocals
- Jay Joyce — guitar, keyboards, bass, drum box
- Kevin Fox — guitar, cello
- Stuart Cameron — guitar, lap steel
- Peter Fusco — bass
- Blake Manning — drums
- Stefan Szczesniak — percussion
- Bill Bell — guitar, mandolin on "We Will Not Be Lovers"
- Ron Sexsmith — guitar on "Someway, Somehow"

== Production ==
- All tracks produced by Jay Joyce, except for "Ocean of Sorrows" produced, engineered and mixed by Bill Bell at Soleil Studios, Toronto, ON
- Engineered by Jason Hall, Jay Joyce at The Orange Lounge, Toronto ON
- Assisted by Jason Donkersgoed, Alex Bonenfant, William Sender
- Overdubs Recorded at tragedy/tragedy, Nashville TN
- All tracks mixed by David Leonard at East Iris Studios, Nashville TN; except "Someway, Somehow" mixed by Jay Joyce and "Ocean of Sorrows" mixed by Bill Bell
