= Shaye =

Canadian pop music group

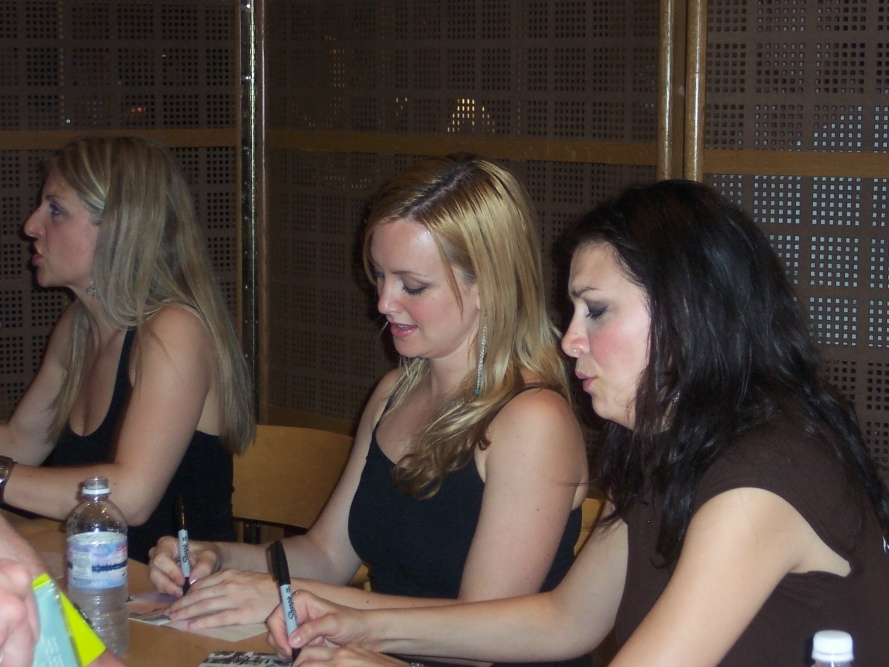
- Shaye in 2004

Background information
- Genres: Contemporary Folk; Pop
- Years active: 2003–2009
- Label: EMI Music Canada
- Past members: Kim Stockwood (2003–09); Damhnait Doyle (2003–09); Tara MacLean (2003–07)

Shaye was a Canadian pop group, consisting of singer-songwriters Kim Stockwood, Damhnait Doyle and Tara MacLean. MacLean left the group in 2007 and the band folded by 2009. The band is named after MacLean's sister who died in a car accident in 2002.

== Biography ==
=== The Bridge ===
Shaye's debut album The Bridge (produced by Bill Bell and Jay Joyce) was released in 2003 on EMI Canada. The album features songs by Ron Hynes, Sinéad Lohan and Crash Vegas. Support for the album included shows in Canada and Japan. "Happy Baby", the lead single, was nominated for Single of the Year at the 2004 Juno Awards. At the 2004 Canadian Radio Music Awards the group was named Best New Group in the mainstream adult contemporary radio category. Another single, "Beauty", followed in January 2005.

=== Lake of Fire ===
Their 2006 followup, Lake of Fire was released on EMI Canada. It was exclusively available on iTunes in November 2006, then released physically as a cardboard Digipak in February 2007. It was produced by Jay Joyce (Patty Griffin, Tim Finn, Chantal Kreviazuk) and features songs by Van Morrison, Mike Scott of The Waterboys and Ron Sexsmith. Two singles were released from the album and the band toured Canada opening for Willie Nelson.

=== Disbanding ===
On October 8, 2007, Tara MacLean announced that she was leaving the trio.

After MacLean's departure, Stockwood and Doyle announced on their website they would continue making music together as "Shaye". In 2009, Shaye's official website was redirected to MySpace where it was announced the band was officially no longer together. Kim Stockwood and Damhnait Doyle thanked their fans for all of their support.

=== Solo careers ===
In 2009, Damhnait Doyle, along with Blake Manning, Stuart Cameron and Peter Fusco, formed a new band called The Heartbroken. They released their debut album Tonight Tonight in June 2010. In September 2016, they released their follow up recording, Storm Clouds. Doyle most recently released her solo album, Liquor Store Flowers in April 2019.

In March 2011, Stockwood released her fourth studio album Back to the Water. It includes performances with fellow Shaye band member Damhnait Doyle, and Newfoundland bands The Once and The Dardanelles. The album won the East Coast Music Association Award for traditional recording of the year in 2011. CMT aired a television special about Stockwood, also entitled Back to the Water, in March 2011.

On October 20, 2017, Stockwood released an EP featuring Bill King on piano entitled Sometimes The Moon. This project features six cover songs including the title track by her deceased mentor Ron Hynes.

Tara MacLean's fourth studio album Atlantic Blue was released on May 22, 2017, to project supporters on PledgeMusic on digital, CD, and vinyl. As part of the promotion of the project, an EP called Evidence was released on NoiseTrade as a free download (donation optional), which featured a mix of released and previously unreleased tracks.

Atlantic Blue is a show and an album celebrating of Canadian east coast songwriters and contains covers of songs by Gene MacLellan, Gordie Sampson, Hank Snow, Lennie Gallant, The Rankin Family, Rita MacNeil, Ron Hynes, Sarah McLachlan, Shaye, Stan Rogers, and Stompin' Tom Connors.

== Discography ==
=== Studio albums ===
Year	Album details	CAN
2003	The Bridge: Released: November 10, 2003; Label: EMI Music Canada	—
2006	Lake of Fire: Released: November 7, 2006; Label: EMI Music Canada	92

=== Singles and EPs ===
- Happy Baby (Single) (2003)
- Beauty (Single) (2004)
- Selections (Second Cup Promotional EP) (2006)
- Lake of Fire (Single) (2006)
- You're Not Alone (Single)
- "God" (Single) (2020)
- "Silver Civic" (Single) (2022)

== Awards and nominations ==
- 2005 - Won SOCAN Pop Music Award — SOCAN Awards — "Happy Baby"
- 2004 - Won Best New Group Mainstream AC/Hot AC — Canadian Radio Music Award — "Happy Baby"
- 2005 - Nominated Album of the Year — East Coast Music Awards — The Bridge
- 2005 - Nominated Group of the Year — East Coast Music Awards
- 2005 - Nominated Pop Recording of the Year — East Coast Music Awards — "Happy Baby"
- 2005 - Nominated Songwriter of the Year — East Coast Music Awards — "Happy Baby"
- 2005 - Nominated Single of the Year — East Coast Music Awards — "Happy Baby"
- 2004 - Nominated Single of the Year — Juno Awards — "Happy Baby"
- 2004 - Nominated Video of the Year — East Coast Music Awards — "Happy Baby"
- 2004 - Nominated Group of the Year — Music Industry of Newfoundland & Labrador Awards
