= Kim Stockwood =

Canadian pop musician

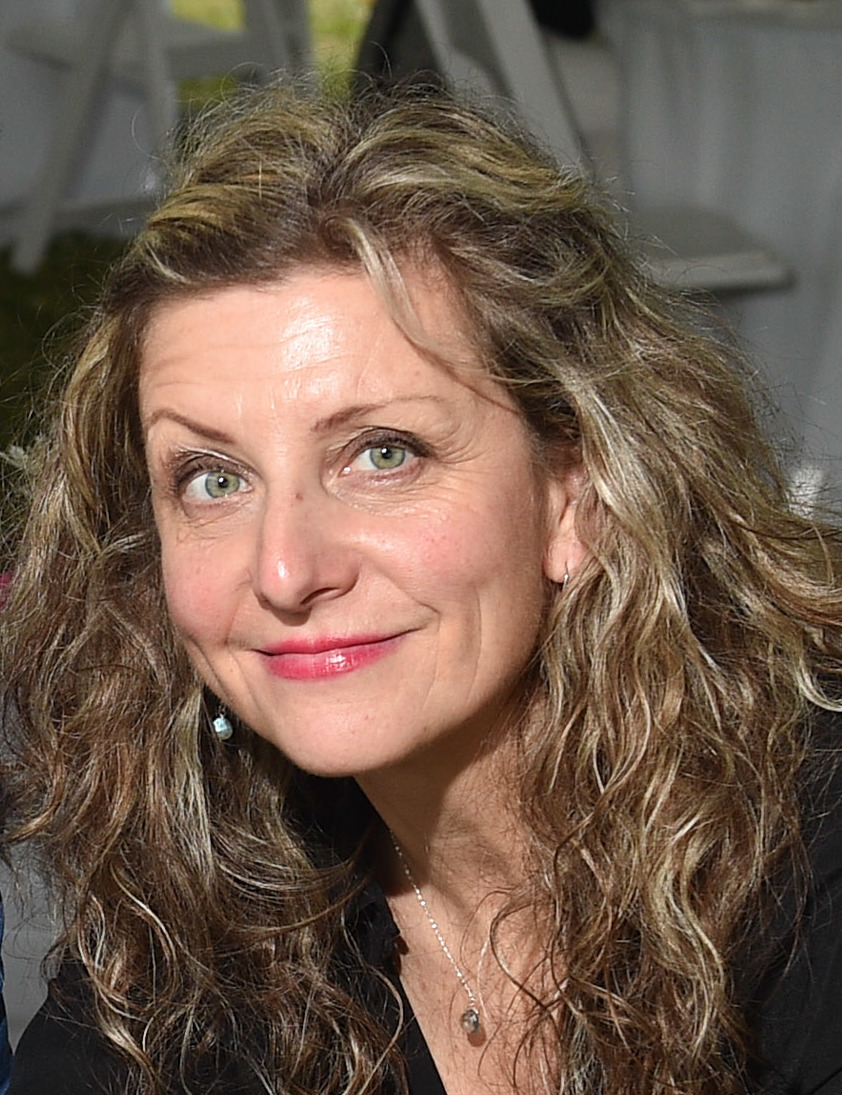

Background information
- Born: 11 November 1965 (age 61)
- Origin: St. John's, Newfoundland, Canada
- Genres: Contemporary folk; pop
- Occupations: Musician; singer; composer
- Instruments: Vocals; guitar
- Years active: 1995–present
- Labels: Capitol; EMI Music Canada
- Formerly of: Shaye
- Website: www.kimstockwood.com

Kim Stockwood (born 11 November 1965) is a Canadian pop musician, singer and composer originally from St. John's, Newfoundland and Labrador. She has recorded as a solo artist and also as a member of Atlantic Canadian music group Shaye with Damhnait Doyle and Tara MacLean.

== Career ==
Stockwood began her music career in 1990 performing on folk nights at a local pub in St. John's, where she grew up. Soon after she was playing weekend gigs, while retaining her day job. In 1992, she moved to Toronto in search of a record deal. There, she talked her way into the office of EMI president Mike McCarty, chatted for an hour, then sang two songs for him right there at his piano. She left that day with a publishing deal and had a full-fledged recording contract within five months.

Her first album, Bonavista, was released in 1995. With something of a country-rock feeling, the album was named after the town in Newfoundland where both her grandmother and her mother were born. Among the musicians who played on the album and co-wrote songs with her were Randy Bachman and Matthew Sweet. The album, however, did not initially receive a lot of attention; its first two singles didn't catch on and sales were slow. After a record company executive heard Stockwood rehearsing a catchy, pop-rock-oriented song for an impending concert, the label decided to release Bonavista internationally in 1996 with two additional songs. One of them, "Jerk," became an international hit, and eventually a top 10 hit on the Canadian pop chart. The repackaged album earned Stockwood a 1996 Juno Award nomination for best new artist and a SOCAN Award for pop song of the year ("Enough Love").

In 1999, Stockwood released her second album, 12 Years Old. The title track was a last-minute addition to the album, having been written with Abenna Frempong and Peter Vettese while the three of them were attending a songwriters' camp in Devon, England sponsored by EMI. The song became a Top 40 hit and was named single of the year at the 2000 East Coast Music Awards.

2002 saw Stockwood collaborate with close friends Tara MacLean and Damhnait Doyle to form the group Shaye, named after Tara Maclean's sister Shaye Martirano, who died as the result of injuries suffered in a motor vehicle accident. Shaye's debut album The Bridge (produced by Bill Bell and Jay Joyce) was released in 2003 on EMI Canada. The album features songs by Ron Hynes, Sinéad Lohan and Crash Vegas. Support for the album included shows in Canada and Japan. "Happy Baby" the lead single, was nominated for Single of the Year at the 2004 Juno Awards. A second single, "Beauty", made it into the top 20 on the Canadian Adult Contemporary chart.

The band's 2006 followup, Lake of Fire was released on EMI Canada. It was exclusively available on iTunes in November 2006, then released physically in February 2007. The album features songs by Van Morrison, The Waterboys and Ron Sexsmith, among others. Twelve of the 13 tracks were produced by Jay Joyce, with one song produced by Bill Bell. The song "Lake of Fire" rose to number 13 on the charts in early 2007.

Tara MacLean left the band in 2007, and that was effectively the end of the road for Shaye, although the band did end up the subject of a four-part documentary aired on E! in Canada later that year.

In 2006, Stockwood released a Christmas CD called I Love Santa.

Apart from singing, she was part of the radio morning show team on Astral Media's CJEZ-FM (97.3 EZ Rock) Toronto, with Humble Howard and Colleen Rusholme, from August 2008 to November 2009. She has also been a guest host on a variety of TV programs, including Saturday Night at the Junos, the Canadian Radio Music Awards, and the East Coast Music Awards.

In March 2011, Stockwood released her fourth studio album Back to the Water. It includes performances with fellow Shaye band member Damhnait Doyle, and Newfoundland bands The Once and The Dardanelles. The album won the East Coast Music Association Award for traditional recording of the year in 2011. CMT aired a TV special about Stockwood, also entitled Back to the Water, in March 2011.

On 20 October 2017, Stockwood released an EP featuring Bill King on piano entitled Sometimes The Moon. This project features six cover songs including the title track by her deceased mentor Ron Hynes.

== Personal life ==
Stockwood is married to Allan Reid, who is the president and CEO of the Canadian Academy of Recording Arts and Sciences (CARAS). They have two sons, Jack and Sam Reid.

== Discography ==
=== Albums ===
- Bonavista (1995)
- 12 Years Old (1999)
- I Love Santa (2006)
- Back to the Water (2011)
- Sometimes The Moon (EP)(2017)

==== with Shaye ====
- The Bridge (LP) (2003)
- Lake of Fire (LP) (2007)

=== Singles ===
| Year | Title | Chart Positions | | Album |
| Year | Title | CAN | CAN AC | Album |
|---|---|---|---|---|
| 1995 | "She's Not in Love" | 13 | 7 | Bonavista |
| 1995 | "Enough Love" | 19 | 7 | Bonavista |
| 1996 | "Jerk" | 3 | 12 | Bonavista |
| 1996 | "You Won't Remember This" | 10 | 26 | Bonavista |
| 1999 | "12 Years Old" | 7 | 5 | 12 Years Old |
| 1999 | "You and Me" | 26 | 16 | 12 Years Old |
| 2000 | "Still" | — | 45 | 12 Years Old |
| 2006 | "Home This Christmas" | — | — | I Love Santa |

== Awards and nominations ==
| Year | Nominee / work | Award | Result |
|---|---|---|---|
| 1996 | Best new artist | JUNO | Nominated |
| 1996 | Female artist of the year | ECMA | Nominated |
| 1996 | Pop/Rock artist of the year | ECMA | Nominated |
| 1997 | Song of the Year (Enough Love) | SOCAN | Won |
| 1997 | Album of the Year (Bonavista) | ECMA | Nominated |
| 1997 | Single of the Year (Enough love) | ECMA | Nominated |
| 1997 | Songwriter of the year | ECMA | Nominated |
| 2000 | Pop/Rock Artist of the Year | ECMA | Won |
| 2000 | Single of the Year (12 Years Old) | ECMA | Won |
| 2000 | Female Artist of the Year | ECMA | Nominated |
| 2000 | Album of the Year (12 Years Old) | ECMA | Nominated |
| 2000 | Songwriter of the Year | ECMA | Nominated |
| 2000 | Entertainer of the Year | ECMA | Nominated |
| 2004 | Single of the Year (Shaye - Happy Baby) | JUNO | Nominated |
| 2004 | AC/Hot AC (Shaye - Happy Baby) | Canadian Radio Music Award | Won |
| 2004 | Video of the Year (Shaye - Happy Baby) | ECMA | Won |
| 2005 | Pop Song of the Year (Happy Baby) | SOCAN | Won |
| 2005 | Album of the Year (Shaye The Bridge) | ECMA | Nominated |
| 2005 | Group of the year | ECMA | Nominated |
| 2005 | Pop Recording of the Year (Shaye The Bridge) | ECMA | Nominated |
| 2005 | Songwriter of the Year (Shaye Happy Baby) | ECMA | Nominated |
| 2005 | Single of the Year (Shaye Happy Baby) | ECMA | Nominated |
| 2011 | Female Artist of the Year | MusicNL | Nominated |
| 2011 | SOCAN Songwriter of the Year | MusicNL | Nominated |
| 2011 | Folk/Roots Album of the Year (Back to the Water) | MusicNL | Nominated |
| 2012 | Roots/Traditional Solo Recording of the Year (Back to the Water) | ECMA | Won |
| 2012 | Folk Category (Back to the Water) | USA Songwriting Competition | Nominated |
