= Hyperdramatic =

Studio album by Damhnait Doyle
- Released: 2000
- Genre: Contemporary folk
- Label: EMI Music Canada
- Producer: Dave Hodge

Damhnait Doyle chronology
Shadows Wake Me (1996)	Hyperdramatic (2000)	Davnet (2003)

Hyperdramatic is the second studio album by Canadian singer Damhnait Doyle, released in 2000 (see 2000 in music) on EMI Music Canada, four years after her debut album, Shadows Wake Me. The album was produced by Dave Hodge.

Doyle spent three years developing her songwriting skills and working on material for the album. Much of the material came from her personal journal entries that initially she had not intended to be lyrics. In contrast to her previous album, in which she co-wrote most of the lyrics but not the music, on Hyperdramatic she co-wrote all of the music as well. Songwriting collaborators included the album's producer, Dave Hodge, as well as Christopher Ward and Craig Northey.

The lead single, "Tattooed", charted in Canada, and its video was played in rotation on MuchMusic, MusiquePlus, and MuchMoreMusic. The Calgary Herald's album review called Doyle "moodier, more experienced, more focussed" compared to her first album, and said that "her voice soothes, slices, soars, all the while quaking with feeling." Ben Rayner of the Toronto Star praised the title track as well as Doyle's "nicely sharp-edged voice", but said that on the whole the album is "hampered by generic songwriting and dutifully stylized overproduction that's trying hard not to sound equally generic." Similarly, a review in the Edmonton Journal called the album "beautiful but creatively boring".

According to EMI, this album represented the first time a Canadian musician on a major label offered free downloads of the album (for a limited time).

== Track listing ==
1. "Maybe It's You"
2. "So Well"
3. "Hyperdramatic"
4. "Tattooed"
5. "Learn to Crawl"
6. "Lie to You"
7. "Never Too Late"
8. "Elusive Drug"
9. "(Because I) Love Myself"
10. "Sleep Past You"
11. "Maybe a Son"
