= Jerk (Kim Stockwood song) =

1996 single by Kim Stockwood

Single by Kim Stockwood

from the album Bonavista
- B-side: "Compassion"; "Be Where You Are"; "Enough Love"
- Released: 1996
- Length: 4:06
- Label: EMI
- Songwriters: Kim Stockwood; Naoise Sheridan
- Producer: Michael Phillip Wojewoda

Kim Stockwood singles chronology
"Enough Love" (1995)	"Jerk" (1996)	"You Won't Remember This" (1996)

"Jerk" is a song by Canadian singer-songwriter Kim Stockwood, released in 1996 as the third single from her debut album, Bonavista. Stockwood wrote the song after Bonavista was released in 1995, but the album was re-released in 1996 with "Jerk" as the third track. The song became Stockwood's most successful hit in Canada, climbing to number three on the RPM 100 Hit Tracks chart. It also found success in Poland, where it was a number-one airplay hit, as well as in Iceland and New Zealand, reaching the top 40 in these countries.

== Background ==
Stockwood wrote the song with Naoise Sheridan seven months after the release of Bonavista in mid-1995. By that point, the two had worked out the melody of the song but were having trouble coming up with a suitable chorus. "...I tried to jam so many words in that chorus. It was just so ridiculous, nothing suited it," Stockwood said. She believed she had to wait for it to come to her. Eventually, Stockwood came up with the chorus, but she felt skeptical about singing the immature-sounding lyrics "You jerk / You jerk / You are such a jerk"; however, after she sang the song a few times, she began to enjoy the refrain, citing the purging of emotions. She then performed the song for her A&R representative, who demanded a re-release of Bonavista so the song could appear on the album, as well as her eventual fourth single, "You Won't Remember This".

The album was re-released in 1996 with "Jerk" and "You Won't Remember This" on the track list while "Half the Man" and "Strong as I Should Be" were absent. This re-release occurred while fellow Canadian rock musical Alanis Morissette was prevailing the music charts with her album Jagged Little Pill, but Stockwood did not think too much of the situation, saying, "'Is "Jerk" actually going to get on the radio? Come on.' But then, I’m going, 'Hey, Alanis says the f-word in hers.' ... and I’m like, 'Hey! Maybe I have a shot!'"

== Track listings ==
Canadian and Italian CD single

1. "Jerk" – 4:06
2. "Compassion" – 4:05
3. "Be Where You Are" – 5:12

US cassette single

1. "Jerk" – 4:13
2. "Enough Love" – 3:31

== Charts ==
=== Weekly charts ===
Chart (1996)	Peak position
Canada Top Singles (RPM)	3
Canada Adult Contemporary (RPM)	12
Iceland (Íslenski Listinn Topp 40)	33
New Zealand (Recorded Music NZ)	23
Poland Airplay (Music & Media)	1

=== Year-end charts ===
Chart (1996)	Position
Canada Top Singles (RPM)	36
Canada Adult Contemporary (RPM)	91

== Release history ==
Region	Date	Format(s)	Label(s)	Ref.
Canada	1996	CD	EMI Music Canada	
United States	January 21, 1997	Contemporary hit radio	Curb	
