= The Heartbroken =

Canadian indie rock band

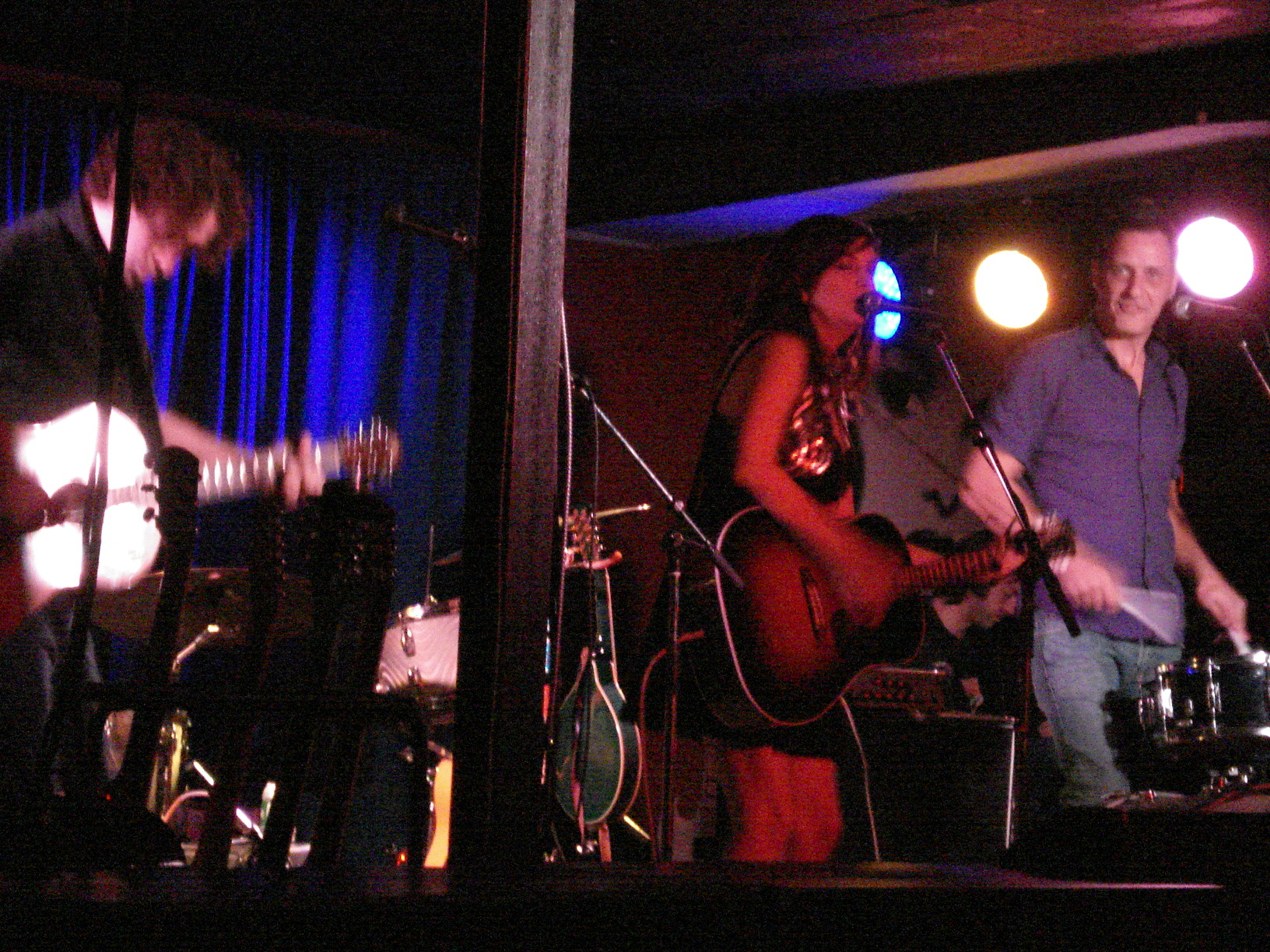
- The Heartbroken in Waterloo, Ontario

Background information
- Origin: Toronto, Ontario, Canada
- Genres: Indie, country
- Years active: 2009 – present
- Members: Damhnait Doyle; Stuart Cameron; Blake Manning; Peter Fusco
- Website: theheartbroken.com

The Heartbroken is a Canadian indie rock band based in Toronto, Ontario. The band consists of Damhnait Doyle, Blake Manning, Stuart Cameron and Peter Fusco.

== History ==
The Heartbroken came together in 2009, and made their debut in March that year at the East Coast Music Awards. The band members had played together previously in Doyle's band Shaye.

The band released an album, Tonight Tonight, in 2011, with guest musicians Stew Crookes and fiddler James McKie. The album was nominated for a Canadian Country Music Award. That year the band went on a Canadian tour.

A second album, Storm Clouds, was released in 2016.

== Discography ==
=== Studio albums ===
Title	Album details
Tonight Tonight	Release date: August 3, 2010; Label: Heartbroken Music
Storm Clouds	Release date: October 2016; Label: Heartbroken Music

=== Singles ===
Year	Single	Peak positions	Album
Year	Single	CAN Country	Album
2011	"Seventeen"	49	Tonight Tonight
2011	"The Truth"	—	Tonight Tonight

== Awards and nominations ==
Year	Association	Category	Result
2011	Canadian Country Music Association	Group or Duo of the Year	Nominated
2013	Canadian Country Music Association	Roots Artist or Group of the Year	Nominated
