= Damhnait Doyle =

Canadian musician

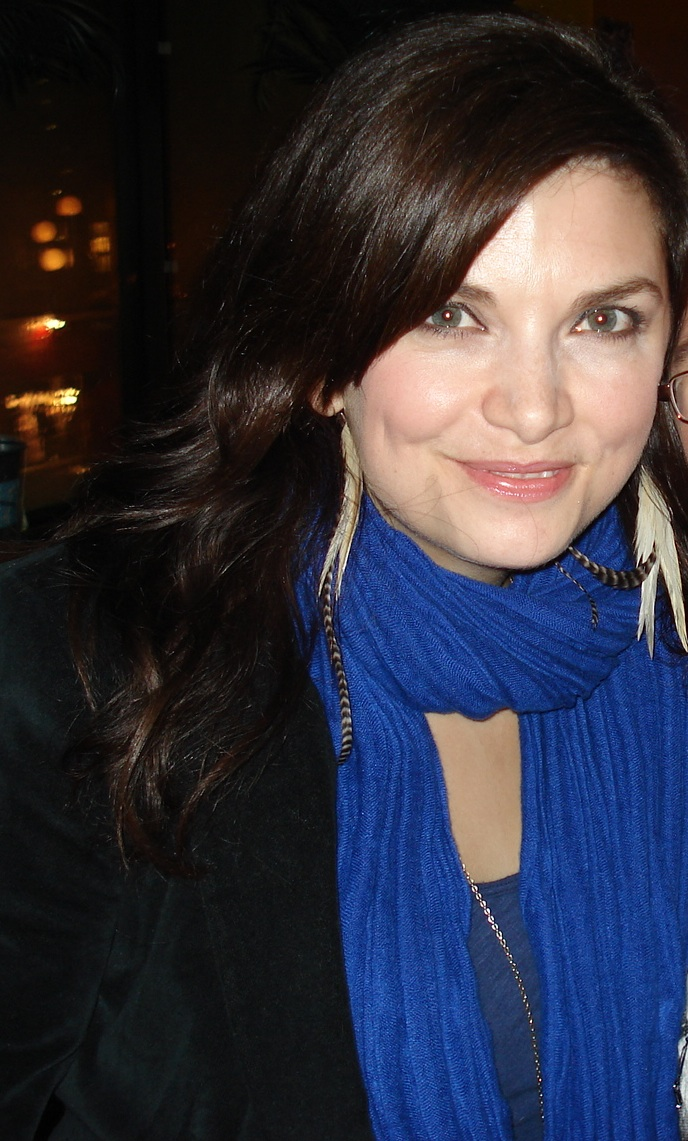
- Doyle at the Starlight Lounge in Waterloo, Ontario, Canada. November 16, 2010

Background information
- Born: December 9, 1975 (age 50)
- Origin: Wabush, Labrador, Canada
- Genres: Folk; pop; country
- Occupations: Musician; singer; composer; radio host
- Instruments: Vocals; guitar; clarinet
- Years active: 1996–present
- Label: Maple Music
- Website: http://damhnaitdoyle.com

Damhnait Doyle (/ˈdævnɪt/; born December 9, 1975) is a Canadian singer, composer and radio host. A phonetic spelling of her first name (which is Irish) also serves as the title of her 2003 album Davnet. She was a member of Atlantic Canadian band Shaye from 2003–2009 with Kim Stockwood and Tara MacLean (2003–2007). Along with Blake Manning, Stuart Cameron and Peter Fusco, she formed a new band called The Heartbroken; they have been active since 2009.

== Career ==
Doyle took singing, guitar and clarinet lessons as a child, and released her debut album, Shadows Wake Me, in 1996. The lead single was "A List of Things", and the album garnered a Juno Award nomination and several East Coast Music Award nominations for Doyle. She toured Canada with Steve Earle in support of his album I Feel Alright.

In 2000, Doyle released her follow-up album, Hyperdramatic which included the single "Tattooed", "Never Too Late", directed by Rob Heydon was nominated for Video of the Year at the East Coast Music Awards. In 2001, Doyle won four ECMA's, including Video of the Year and Female Artist of the Year.

In 2003, Doyle's third album, Davnet, was released. The CD was produced and co-written by Gordie Sampson at Lakewind Sound Studios, his Cape Breton recording studio. The first single was "Another California Song", written by Doyle and Sampson. The video featured Doyle's Shaye bandmates Kim Stockwood and Tara MacLean. A video was also released for "Traffic".

In Christmas of that year, she went to Kabul, Afghanistan, to sing for the Canadian troops there, on the Christmas special Rick Mercer's Christmas in Kabul.

She has worked with Alexz Johnson, co-writing two songs on Songs from Instant Star, then four on Songs from Instant Star Two. She recorded two songs on Songs from Instant Star 3: "Just the Beginning" as well as "Darkness Round The Sun" and two songs on Songs from Instant Star 4: "The Music" and "I Still Love You". The song "Say What You Will" was featured in the Degrassi: The Next Generation episode "The Bitterest Pill", where the school held a memorial for a J.T. Yorke, who was fatally stabbed in the prior episode.

She did a duet with Rex Goudie on his album Look Closer, on the song "Like I Was Dying", which she also co-wrote.

In 2008, Doyle lent her voice to the title sequence of Degrassi: TNG, but her version of the theme was only used for the eighth season.

In 2009, Doyle, along with Blake Manning, Stuart Cameron and Peter Fusco, formed a new band called The Heartbroken. They released their debut album Tonight Tonight in June 2010. In September 2016, they released their follow up recording, Storm Clouds.

Doyle wrote a song for a play her father Clar Doyle wrote for EDFNL, titled the same as the play: "Are You Watching Me Now?".

In April 2019, Doyle released her solo album, Liquor Store Flowers.

In June 2020, she co-hosted the Juno Awards of 2020 alongside Odario Williams. She is the host of Mornings on the CBC Music radio network.

In April 2021, Doyle sang the song "Sleeping in the Cold Below", a stylised sea shanty, for inclusion in the game Warframe''s Call Of The Tempestarii update.

== Discography ==
- Shadows Wake Me (LP) (1996)
- Hyperdramatic Sampler (EP) (1999)
- Hyperdramatic (LP) (2000)
- Davnet (LP) (2003)
- Lights Down Low (LP) (2008)
- Liquor Store Flowers (LP) (2019)

Singles

- "Whatever You Need" (1996) [#34 CAN]
- "A List of Things" (1996) [#10 CAN]
- "Till I Gain Control Again" (2020) With Stuart Cameron

With Shaye

- "Happy Baby" (Single) (2003)
- The Bridge (LP) (2003)
- "Beauty" (Single) (2004)
- "Lake of Fire" (Single) (2006)
- "You're Not Alone" (Single) (2007)
- Lake of Fire (LP) (2007)
- "God" (Single) (2020)

With The Heartbroken

- Tonight Tonight (LP) (2010)
- Storm Clouds (LP) (2016)

== Awards and achievements ==
- 1997
  - JUNO Award Nomination – Best New Solo Artist
  - ECMA Award Nomination – Album of the Year [Shadows Wake Me]
  - ECMA Award Nomination – Entertainer of the Year
  - ECMA Award Nomination – Female Artist of the Year
  - ECMA Award Nomination – Single of the Year [“A List of Things”]
  - ECMA Award Nomination – Video of the Year [“A List of Things”]
- 2001
  - ECMA Award Winner – Female Artist of the Year [Hyperdramatic]
  - ECMA Award Winner – Video of the Year [“Tattooed”]
  - ECMA Award Nomination – Album of the Year [Hyperdramtic]
  - ECMA Award Nomination – Pop Rock Recording of the Year [Hyperdramtic]
  - ECMA Award Nomination – Single of the Year [“Tattooed”]
  - ECMA Award Nomination – Songwriter of the Year [“Tattooed”]
  - ECMA Award Nomination – Video of the Year [“Never Too Late”]
- 2003
  - International Songwriting Competition – “Afterglow”
- 2004
  - JUNO Award Nomination – Single of the Year [“Happy Baby”]
  - Canadian Radio Music Award Winner – Best New Group Mainstream AC/Hot AC [“Happy Baby”]
  - ECMA Award Winner – Female Artist of the Year [davnet]
  - ECMA Award Winner – Pop/Rock Recording of the Year [davnet]
  - ECMA Award Nomination – Single of the Year [“Another California Song”]
  - ECMA Award Nomination – Songwriter of the Year [“Another California Song”]
  - ECMA Nomination – Video of the Year [“Happy Baby”]
  - Music NL Nomination – Group of the Year [Shaye]
  - Music NL Nomination – Pop/Rock Artist/Group of the Year [Shaye]
- 2005
  - SOCAN Pop Music Award Winner [“Happy Baby”]
  - ECMA Award Winner – Single of the Year [“Happy Baby”]
  - ECMA Award Nomination – Album of the Year [The Bridge]
  - ECMA Award Nomination – Group of the Year [Shaye]
  - ECMA Award Nomination – Pop Recording of the Year [The Bridge]
  - ECMA Award Nomination – Songwriter of the Year [“Happy Baby”]
  - ECMA Award Nomination – Single of the Year [“Happy Baby”]
- 2008
  - Music NL Award Nomination – Female Artist of the Year
  - ECMA Nomination - Pop Recording of the Year [Lake of Fire]
  - ECMA Nomination - Single of the Year [“Lake of Fire”]
- 2009
  - ECMA Nomination – Recording of the Year [Lights Down Low]
  - ECMA Nomination – Pop Recording of the Year
- 2011
  - CCMA Award Nomination – Group or Duo of the Year [The Heartbroken]
- 2013
  - CCMA Award Winner – Roots Artist/Group of the Year [The Heartbroken]
  - CMAO Group or Duo of the Year (The Heartbroken)
- 2014
  - CCMA Group of the Year Nominee (The Heartbroken)
  - CMAO Roots Artist/Group of the Year (The Heartbroken)
- 2015
  - CMAO Roots Artist/Group of the Year (The Heartbroken)
- 2020
  - ECMA Award Nomination - Contemporary Roots Record [Liquor Store Flowers]
  - ECMA Award Nomination - Solo Recording of the Year [Liquor Store Flowers]

== Industry boards ==
- 2018–Present
  - SOCAN, Director
  - Canadian Songwriters Hall of Fame, Director
  - Songwriters Association of Canada, Director

== Music placements in film and television ==
- "24 Hours" Alexz Johnson Songs from Instant Star (Orange, Sony BMG)
- "Time to Be Your 21" Alexz Johnson Songs from Instant Star (Orange)
- "Criminal" Alexz Johnson Songs from Instant Star (Orange)
- "Not Standing Alone" Alexz Johnson Instant Star Two (Orange)
- "How I Feel" Alexz Johnson Instant Star Two (Orange)
- "Anyone But You" Alexz Johnson Instant Star Two (Orange)
- "Liar Liar" Alexz Johnson Instant Star Two (Orange)
- "Liar Liar" Alexz Johnson Laguna Beach Placement (MTV)
- "Let's Start from Here" Joanna Wang Hold Onto A Dream (Avex/Sony BMG)
- "I Owe it All to You" Eva Avila Somewhere Else (Sony BMG)
- "Live Like I Was Dying" Rex Goudie Look Closer (Sony BMG)
- "Clothes On My Back" Kyle Riabko TBA (Columbia/Aware)
- "Happy Baby" Shaye The Bridge (EMI)
- "Happy Baby" Shaye Women & Songs 9 (Warner)
- "Happy Baby" Shaye Red White & Pop (Sony)
- "Happy Baby" Shaye Juno Awards 2004 (Universal)

== Bibliography ==
- Miscellaneous Female: The Journals of Damhnait Doyle (2005)
