= If I Fall (Tara MacLean song) =

Single by Tara MacLean

from the album Passenger
- Released: 1999
- Length: 4:03
- Label: Nettwerk Records, Capitol Records
- Songwriter: Tara MacLean
- Producers: Malcolm Burn, Bill Bell

"If I Fall" is a song by Tara MacLean, from her album Passenger, first released in 1999.

== Track listing ==
1. "If I Fall" [Radio Edit] — 4.00
2. "If I Fall" [Album Version] — 4.09

== Soundtracks ==
"If I Fall" was featured on the soundtrack of the film Teaching Mrs. Tingle.

== Charts ==
=== Weekly charts ===
Weekly chart performance for "If I Fall"
| Chart (1999–2000) | Peak position |
|---|---|
| Canada Top Singles (RPM) | 45 |
| Canada Adult Contemporary (RPM) | 40 |
