= Shadows Wake Me =

Studio album by Damhnait Doyle
- Released: 1996
- Genre: Contemporary folk
- Length: 46:06
- Label: Latitude; EMI Music Canada
- Producer: Ken Myhr

Damhnait Doyle chronology
| Shadows Wake Me (1996) | Hyperdramatic (2000) |

Shadows Wake Me is the first studio album by Canadian singer Damhnait Doyle, released in 1996 (see 1996 in music) on the indie label Latitude Records, then later EMI Music Canada. The album was produced by guitarist Ken Myhr, who previously worked with such artists as Jane Siberry and Cowboy Junkies. Although a novice songwriter, Doyle co-wrote many songs on the album, some with Myhr, and others with Chris Tait, Tim Welch, David Gray, and Anne Bourne.

Doyle said in interviews that her home province of Newfoundland had a major influence: "Newfoundland has a lot to do with where my writing comes from and also the kind of person I am, my values and how I assert myself. It ties in with nature, the sea, folklore tales and the people surrounding me."

Music critics compared her vocal style to that of Sarah McLachlan, with one critic noting the album "fits nicely between ethereal Sarah McLachlan and angry Alanis Morissette."

The album charted on The Record's adult contemporary music chart. Critic Greg Burliuk of the Kingston Whig-Standard named it one of his top-ten favourite albums of the year, referring to Doyle as "the latest musical treasure from Newfoundland".

Following the album's success, she was nominated for a Juno Award in 1997 for Best New Solo Artist. She also received five East Coast Music Award nominations related to the album, but won none.

== Track listing ==
1. "A List of Things" (3:15)
2. "Nothing Like the Truth" (3:45)
3. "Las Vegas" (4:50)
4. "Mystery to Me" (3:02)
5. "Signal Hill" (4:07)
6. "Shoreline" (5:17)
7. "Whatever You Need" (3:07)
8. "Sunday Mornings" (3:13)
9. "Why" (3:38)
10. "Jumping the Shadows" (2:59)
11. "Please, Please Call" (3:48)
12. "As I Roved Out" (5:05)
