= Davnet =

Studio album by Damhnait Doyle
- Released: 2003
- Genre: Contemporary folk
- Label: Turtlemusik
- Producer: Gordie Sampson

Damhnait Doyle chronology
Hyperdramatic (2000)	Davnet (2003)	Lights Down Low (2007)

Davnet is the third studio album by Canadian singer Damhnait Doyle, released in February 2003 (see 2003 in music) on the Halifax indie label Turtlemusik. It was produced by Gordie Sampson.

Music journalist Bob Mersereau wrote, "She's come a long way since her first album... She's gone from a youngster searching for pop hits to a much better artist letting the songs flow where they should." The Globe and Mail, in a mostly favourable review, described her vocals as "comfy and confident... [Her] voice... is that of an ingénue made wiser but not more bitter by experience."

== Track listing ==
1. "Sinkin' Stone... Part I" (Damhnait Doyle) – 1:15
2. "Another California Song" (Doyle, Gordie Sampson) – 4:44
3. "Deal with God" (Doyle, Sampson) – 3:24
4. "Afterglow" (Doyle, Sampson) – 4:08
5. "Every Hit" (Doyle, Steve Krecklo) – 3:24
6. "Traffic" (Doyle) – 4:05
7. "Sinkin' Stone... Part II" (Doyle) – 1:15
8. "Butterfly" (Doyle, Jeff Pearce) – 4:46
9. "Now When the Rain Falls" (Doyle, Ron Lopata, Dana Manning) – 4:26
10. "Good to You" (Doyle, Jamie Robinson) – 3:56
11. "Jeff" (Doyle) – 3:16
12. "Sinkin' Stone... Part III" (Doyle, Craig Northey) – 0:54
13. "Is It Right" (Doyle, Sampson, Eliza Jane Scott) – 6:08
