= Believing in Better =

Studio album by Lennie Gallant
- Released: 1991
- Recorded: 1991 (?)
- Genre: Folk
- Label: Revenant

Lennie Gallant chronology
Breakwater (1988)	Believing in Better (1991)	Open Window (1994)

Believing in Better is the second studio album by Lennie Gallant, released in 1991 (see 1991 in music). The album helped earn Gallant Male Artist of the Year from the East Coast Music Awards and also garnered two Juno nominations.

== Track listing ==
1. "Believing in Better" (Gallant)
2. "Man of Steel" (Gallant)
3. "Martyn's Brook" (Gallant)
4. "Is It Love I Feel (Or Courage I Lack)" (Gallant/Corrigan)
5. "The Hope for Next Year" (Gallant)
6. "How Many Bridges" (Gallant)
7. "The Cry for Love" (Gallant)
8. "Crumbling Foundations" (Gallant)
9. "The Stairs" (Gallant)
10. "Someone Like You" (Gallant)
11. "The Other Side" (Gallant/Corrigan)

== Credits ==
- Lennie Gallant - guitar, vocals
- Brian Bourne - bass, Chapman stick, vocals
- Chris Corrigan - electric guitar
- Janet Munson - violin, accordion, backing vocals
- Tom Roach - drums, percussion, knee slaps
- Christine Glen - backing vocals
- Hart Rouge - backing vocals
- Matt Zimbel - additional percussion
- Bill Kinal - accordion, bass
