= Breakwater (album) =

Studio album by Lennie Gallant
- Released: October 1, 1988
- Recorded: 1988 (?)
- Genre: Folk
- Label: Revenant

Lennie Gallant chronology
Breakwater (1988)	Believing in Better (1991)

Breakwater is the debut album by Lennie Gallant, released in 1988.

== Track listing ==
1. "Tales of the Phantom Ship", a song inspired by the Ghost Ship of Northumberland Strait.
2. "Island Clay"
3. "Raise the Dead of Wintertime"
4. "Back to Rustico"
5. "From a Distance"
6. "Marie and He"
7. "The Hope for Next Year"
8. "Breakwater"
9. "Big City"
10. "The Reconcillation Two-Step"
11. "La Tempete"
12. "Down on the Promenade"
13. "Destination"

All songs by Lennie Gallant except "Raise the Dead of Wintertime" by Allan Rankin.

== Personnel ==
Side A

- Lennie Gallant - guitar, vocals, harmonica, tin whistle, mandolin
- Janet Munson - violin
- Kevin Roach - mandolin, mandocello and dobro
- Danny Parker - electric and acoustic bass
- Jim Hillman - drums
- Greg Simm - bass (track 6)
- Chris Corrigan - electric guitar (track 6)
- Michel Dupire - percussion (track 5)
- Michael Hinton - accordion [sic] (track 2)
- Teresa Doyle, Suzanne Lamontagne - backup vocals

Side B

- Chris Corrigan - electric guitar
- Bruce Dixon - bass
- Janet Munson - violin
- Steve Naylor - keyboards
- Tom Roach - drums
- Cathy Grant - backup vocals
- Suzanne Lamontagne - backup vocals (track 6)
