= Silence (Tara MacLean album) =

Studio album by Tara MacLean
- Released: 1996
- Recorded: 1995–1996
- Genre: Contemporary folk
- Length: 50:22
- Label: Nettwerk Records
- Producer: Kevin Hamilton, Norman Kerner, Tara MacLean, Stephen Nikleva, Greg Reely

Tara MacLean chronology
Silence (1996)	If You See Me (1997)

Professional ratings
Review scores
Source	Rating
Allmusic	link

Silence is the debut album by Canadian singer-songwriter Tara MacLean, released in 1996 (see 1996 in music).

== Track listing ==
1. "Evidence" – 4:56
  Tara MacLean, Greg Reely, Stephen Nikleva
2. "Let Her Feel The Rain" – 5:27
  MacLean
3. "That's Me" – 4:34
  MacLean
4. "More" – 4:58
  MacLean
5. "Silence" – 5:49
  MacLean, Nikleva
6. "Red" – 4:22
  Jon Levine, MacLean
7. "Holy Tears" – 4:05
  MacLean
8. "In The Wings" – 3:54
  MacLean
9. "If You Could" – 3:19
  MacLean
10. "For You" – 3:55
  MacLean
11. "Let Her Feel The Rain" [Acoustic] – 5:03
  MacLean
12. "Holy Tears" [Instrumental] – 4:07
  MacLean

== Personnel ==
- Tara MacLean – vocals (1, 2, 3, 4, 5, 6, 7, 8, 9, 10, 11, 12), backing vocals (1, 2, 3, 4, 7, 10, 11, 12), acoustic guitar (3, 4), voices (6), classical guitar (9)
- Ashwin Sood – Djembe (1, 4), drums (2, 6, 9, 10, 11), percussion (2, 11), shaker (8)
- Chris Von Sneidern – acoustic guitar (2, 4, 11), electric guitar (4)
- Mark Jowett – 12-string guitar (7, 12), acoustic guitar (10), electric guitar (10)
- Veda Hille – piano (4, 6, 8, 10)
- Bruce Kaphan – pedal steel (2, 11)
- Daniel Presley – keyboard (1), backing vocals (4)
- Dave Kershaw – Hammond organ (7, 8, 12), keyboard (9)
- David Revelli – percussion (4, 7, 8, 12)
- Jack Hines – upright bass (6), string bass (10)
- Mark V – sequencing (9, 11, 12), drum program (10)
- Michael Been – acoustic guitar (1), electric guitar (1)
- Norman Kerner – acoustic guitar (2, 11)
- Peggy Lee – cello (7, 8, 10, 12), string arrangement (7, 8, 12)
- Robin Winburn – saxophone (4, 6)
- Stephen Nikleva – acoustic guitar (7, 9, 12), electric guitar (5, 7, 12), bass guitar (9)
- Tim Haggerty – string samples (3)
- Tony Marryatt – bass guitar (1, 2, 3, 4, 11)

== Production ==
- Produced by Norman Kerner (1, 2, 3, 4, 5, 6, 10, 12)
- Associate Producer: Daniel Presley (1, 2, 3, 4, 5, 6, 10, 12)
- Assistant Engineer: Mike Bogus (1, 2, 3, 4, 5, 6, 10, 12)
- Produced by Norman Kerner, Tara MacLean (7, 8, 11)
- Produced by Greg Reely, Stephen Nikleva (5)
- Produced by Greg Reely, Stephen Nikleva, Kevin Hamilton (9)
- Recorded and Mixed at Brilliant Studios (1, 2, 3, 4, 6, 11, 12)
- Recorded and Mixed by Norman Kerner, Daniel Presley (1, 2, 3, 4, 6, 11, 12)
- Additional Recording at Slack Studios (7, 8, 9, 10)
- Additional Recording at The Glass Elevator (7, 8, 9, 10)
- Additional Recording by Kevin Hamilton (7, 8, 9, 10)
- Recorded and Mixed by Greg Reely (5)
