= Lennie Gallant =

Canadian musical artist

Lennie Gallant C.M.
- Born: Leonard George Gallant; Rustico, Prince Edward Island, Canada
- Origin: Rustico, Prince Edward Island
- Genres: Folk, celtic, rock, country
- Occupations: Musician, singer, songwriter
- Instruments: Guitar, harmonica, bodhran, mandolin
- Works: lenniegallant.com/music
- Label: Gallant Effort Production
- Spinoffs: Sirène et Matelot (Francophone duo with his partner Patricia Richard - see sireneetmatelot.com)
- Website: www.lenniegallant.com

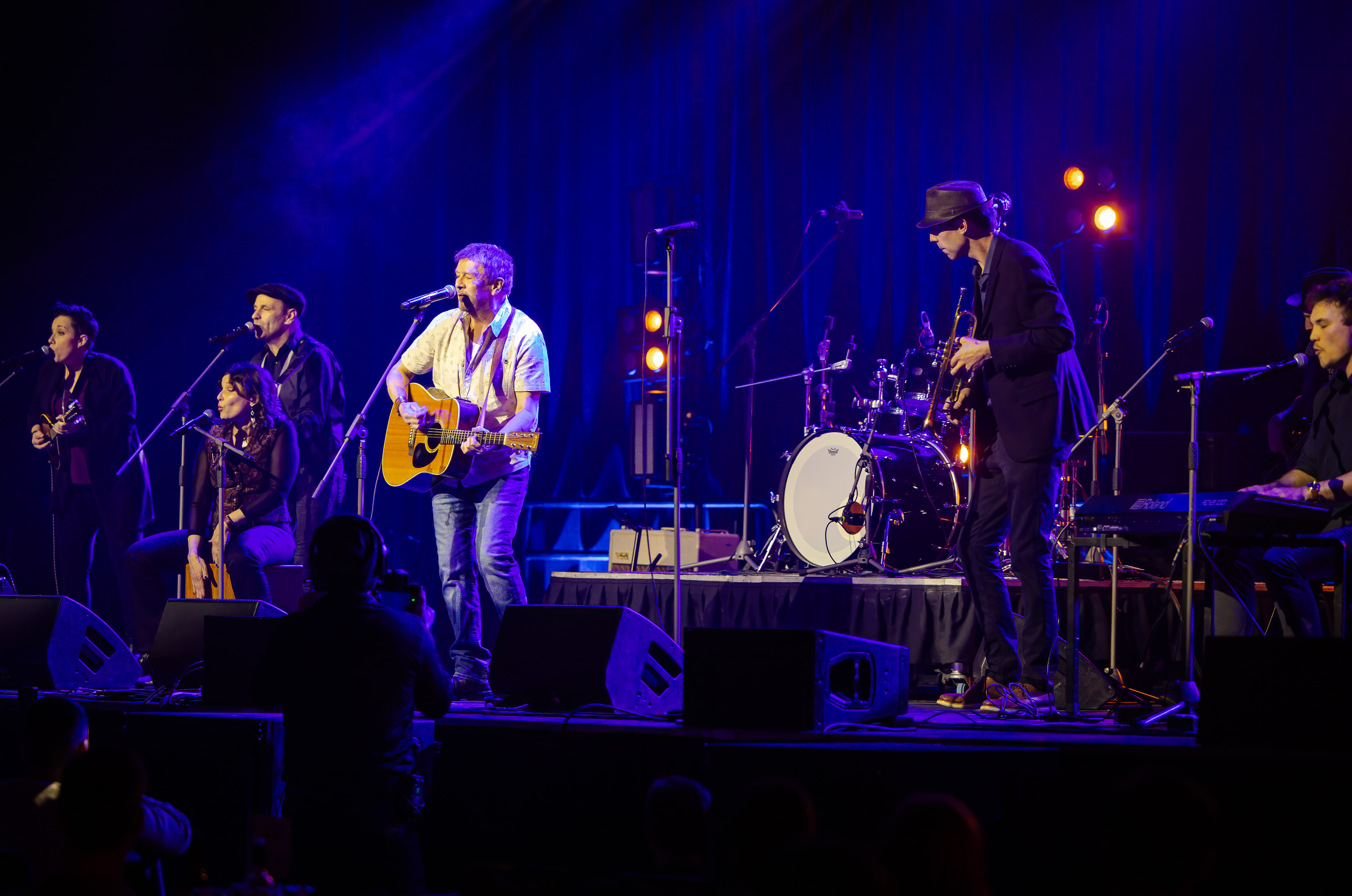
Lennie Gallant and band performing at the 2024 East Coast Music Awards which were held in Prince Edward Island.

Lennie Gallant, CM is a Canadian singer-songwriter and instrumentalist from Prince Edward Island. His music crosses into the folk rock and country music genres, while celebrating the musical heritage of his home province. He has been presented with many awards for his performances and songwriting.

== Early life ==
Gallant was born in Rustico, Prince Edward Island, the eldest of the 6 children of George and Fanny Gallant.

Many of his sibling's children have become well known musicians, such as his nephews Rowen and Caleb Gallant, the sons of his brother Mark, who were members of the folk band Ten Strings and a Goat Skin.

== Career ==
Lennie Gallant began at an early age by playing guitar, harmonica and mandolin in local bands. Gallant has released sixteen albums (12 in English and 4 in French) of original songs which have won him a host of awards and nominations from the JUNOs, Canadian Folk Music Awards, Les Prix Éloizes, and 22 East Coast Music Awards. In 2019, his song Peter's Dream was inducted into the Canadian Songwriter's Hall of Fame.He recently released the album Shelter From the Storms, a powerful reflection on the turbulent times we live in, but also celebrating the enduring human capacity for dealing with these times through connection, love and laughter. Lennie was honoured with the 2026 Canadian Folk Music Award for Solo Artist of the Year, the 2026 ECMA Folk Album of the Year, and the 2026 Music PEI Folk Recording award for this remarkable album. It was also named one of the Top Ten Folk Albums of 2025 in a Roots Music critics poll and by members of the Canadian music industry.

His album, When We Get There was nominated for a 2007 Juno Award and went into space aboard Space Shuttle Endeavour in July 2009. Canadian astronaut Julie Payette chose the album for the astronaut crew on their 16-day mission. In a special ceremony, Payette presented Gallant with his CD, which orbited Earth with her on the International Space Station 248 times.

He performed at the Vancouver Winter Olympic Games, including a performance at BC Place during the medal ceremonies. He represented the East Coast of Canada at "Canada Day in London" in Trafalgar Square on 1 July 2011 in the largest Canada Day celebration outside Canada's borders.

He is an international touring artist and his songs have been covered by many artists. He has shared the stage with several orchestras and with performers such as Jimmy Buffett and David Foster and his band. Lennie struck up a friendship with Jimmy and has two co-writes on Jimmy's last album, and was invited to sing on it as a featured artist.

A number of musicians have recorded his songs internationally, including Jimmy Buffett, who recorded Lennie Gallant's song Mademoiselle Voulez Vous Danser. Artists who have performed his songs include Tara MacLean, Matt Minglewood, Roy Bailey, Sabia, Priscilla Herdman, Delvina Bernard – Four The Moment, and Measha Brueggergosman. He and partner Patricia Richard also record and perform as the popular Francophone duo, Sirène et Matelot (sireneetmatelot.com).

His songs have also appeared in feature films: Canvas included "Mademoiselle Voulez Vous Danser", recorded by Jimmy Buffett, The theme song for Conquest, a feature in Sigh and a Wish: Helen Creighton's Maritimes and the sound track for The Bellinger are all Gallant's compositions. His songs have also been used in television series, including Dawson’s Creek ("Northern Lights") and Joan of Arcadia ("Something Unspoken"), and in various theatrical productions.

He also wrote the OXFAM Song, "Land of the Maya", and Halifax's 250th Birthday Theme Song "History is Happening Now", which was then performed with a choir of 2000 voices on one of the two bridges spanning the harbour. He co-wrote, directed and produced the Pier 21 (Canada’s immigration gateway) National Theme Song and the theme song for Acadian World Conference/Congres Mondial Acadien (Acadie de nos coeur).

Gallant played an acting role in an episode of the feature film Emily of New Moon. He wrote the theme song and acted in The Trial of Minnie MacGee and acted in the short film, A Blessing From the Sea.

Lennie Gallant has been involved in numerous charity events, and he received the PEI Red Cross Humanitarian of the Year Award for his collaboration with and support of many causes. His work with the Mikinduri Children of Hope (for impoverished children in Kenya) is particularly close to his heart, and has raised money through his concerts for this PEI based organization.

Lennie Gallant wrote and performed a song, On the Minnehaha, for Kirsten Neuschäfer, a South African sailor who won the 2022 Golden Globe Race. Neuschäfer spent a year in Prince Edward Island (PEI) while refitting her boat in preparation of the race. Some of the Islanders who took part in refitting of Neuschäfer's boat Minnehaha, including shipwright Eddie Arsenault, appear in the music video. Gallant's song was played upon Neuschäfer's arrival in Les Sables D'olonne, the finish line of the race, as the leading skipper.

== Awards and accomplishments ==
=== Order of Canada ===
He was inducted into the Order of Canada in 2003 where it was said, "Gallant has garnered much respect for his hard hitting songs chronicling the lives of people dealing with tremendous adversity and serious issues. Songs like "Peter's Dream," "Island Clay," "Man of Steel" and "The Hope for Next Year," articulate the feelings of many caught up in desperate situations beyond their control, and at the same time celebrate the beauty of lifestyle and landscape with their strong poetry and stirring narratives." – From the induction ceremony in Ottawa, Canada.

=== Other awards ===
2026 - East Coast Music Award, Folk Album of the Year for “Shelter From the Storms”

2026 - Canadian Folk Music Award, Solo Artist of the Year, for “Shelter From the Storms”

2026 - 2 Music PEI Awards, Video of the Year for “Counting on Angels” and Folk Recording of the Year for his album “Shelter From the Storms”

2025 - “Shelter From the Storms” was named one of the Top Ten Folk Albums of 2025 by members of the Canadian music industry

2025 - Canadian Folk Music Award nomination for his francophone duo Sirène et Matelot

2024 - 2 Music PEI Awards awards for his francophone duo album, “Un monde de dissonances”

2023 - 2 Music PEI Awards, Entertainer of the year and Roots recording of the year

2022 - Queen’s Platinum Jubilee Medal for his valuable contribution to the province of Nova Scotia during his time spent there

2020 - Canadian Folk Music Award for his album "Time Travel"

2019 - His Maritime classic “Peter’s Dream” was inducted into the Canadian Songwriters Hall of Fame

2019 - East Coast Music Directors' Special Achievement Award

2018 - "Time Travel" was named one of the Top Ten Folk Albums by members of the Canadian music industry, alongside albums by Richard Thompson, John Prine and Joan Baez

2017 - East Coast Music Award, Entertainer of the Year

2017 - East Coast Music Award, Folk Recording of the Year, for his album “Searching for Abegweit”

2015 - He received a UPEI Honorary Degree

2014 - Canadian Folk Music Awards, Solo Artist of the Year

2013 - “Peter’s Dream” was voted one of the Top Ten East Coast Songs of all Time in a CBC poll

2013 - He received the PEI Red Cross Humanitarian of the Year Award

2013 - 25^{th} Anniversary special East Coast Music Award

2011 - East Coast Music Award for his French album “Le coeur hanté”

2010 - East Coast Music Award for his album “If we Had a Fire”

2009 - His album “When We Get There”, went up to the International Space Station with Canadian Astronaut Julie Payette

2007 - JUNO nomination

2003 - Prix Éloizes for his album “Le vent bohème”

2003 - 2 East Coast Music Awards for his album “Le vent bohème” and Male Artist of the Year

2003 - He received the Order of Canada

2001 - 3 East Coast Music Awards, FACTOR Recording of the Year and Roots Album of the Year for “Lennie Gallant Live”, and Male Artist of the Year

1998 - East Coast Music Award, Male Artist of the Year

1996 - East Coast Music Award, Songwriter of the Year for “Peter’s Dream”

1995 - 5 East Coast Music Awards, Album of the Year for “Open Window”, Song, Songwriter and Video of the Year for “Which Way Does the River Run, and Male Artist of the Year

1994 - East Coast Music Award for his song “Is it Love I Feel”

1992 - 2 East Coast Music Awards, Male Artist of the Year and Video of the Year for “Man of Steel”

1992 - 2 JUNO nominations

=== Television ===
Gallant's television appearances include CTV Morning Live, CBC, CTV Breakfast Television, East Coast Barenaked East Coast Music!, East Coast Music Awards National Broadcasts, The Vicki Gabereau Show, La Fête en Acadie, Brio, Good Morning Canada, Canada AM, @ The End, En Spectacle au Festival Acadien, Gala des prix Éloizes, Gala des prix Étoiles de l'ARCANB, Much More Music/Much Music/CMT, Tout simplement country, Pour l'amour du country, CTV Christmas Daddies, En direct de l'univers and La grande veillée.

== Discography ==
=== Albums ===
Year	Album
1988	Breakwater
1991	Believing in Better
1994	The Open Window
1997	Lifeline
2000	Lennie Gallant Live
2002	Le Vent Bohème
2005	When We Get There
2009	If We Had a Fire
2009	Le coeur hanté
2014	Live Acoustic at the Carleton
2016	Searching for Abegweit: Songs from the Hit Musical by Lennie Gallant
2018	Time Travel
2019	Sirène et Matelot
2021	Christmas Day on Planet Earth
2023	Un monde de dissonances (Sirène et Matelot)
2025	Shelter From the Storms

=== Singles ===
Year	Single	Chart Positions			Album
Year	Single	CAN Country	CAN AC	CAN	Album
1991	"Is It Love I Feel (Or Courage I Lack)"	—	—	—	Believing in Better
1992	"Man of Steel"	34	—	—	Believing in Better
1992	"The Cry for Love"	44	—	—	Believing in Better
1994	"Believing in Better"	75	—	—	Believing in Better
1994	"Which Way Does the River Run"	32	9	95	The Open Window
1994	"Embers"	—	26	58	The Open Window
1995	"Peter's Dream"	74	29	—	The Open Window
1998	"Meet Me at the Oasis"	—	—	—	Lifeline
2005	"I Want to Save the World for You"	*	*	—	When We Get There
2005	"The Innkeeper"	*	*	—	When We Get There
2007	"47 Angels on Her Front Lawn"	*	*	—	When We Get There
2010	"You Don't Know How Beautiful You Are"	*	*	—	If We Had a Fire
2011	"If We Had a Fire"	*	*	—	If We Had a Fire

=== Music videos ===
Year	Video
1992	Man of Steel
1994	Which Way Does The River Run
1997	Lifeline
1998	Meet Me At The Oasis
2006	Pieces of You
2018	Christmas Day on Planet Earth
2020	Sequoia
2021	Blood and Salt Water
2023	On the Minnehaha
2025	Counting on Angels
2026	Sable Island Horses
