= Silent treatment (disambiguation) =

The silent treatment is a refusal to communicate verbally with someone who desires the communication.

Silent Treatment or The Silent Treatment may also refer to

== Music ==
- Silent Treatment (The Bled album), 2007
- Silent Treatment (Pati Yang album), 2005
- The Silent Treatment (Mark Deutrom album), 2001
- Silent Treatment, a 1986 album by Long John Baldry
- Silent Treatment (Highasakite album), 2014
- "Silent Treatment" (Earl Thomas Conley song), 1980
- "Silent Treatment" (The Joy Formidable song), 2013
- "Silent Treatment" (Freya Skye song), 2025

== Television ==
- "Silent Treatment" (Whitney), a 2011 episode
- "Silent Treatment" (The Powerpuff Girls), a 2003 episode
- "The Silent Treatment" (PB&J Otter), a 1998 episode
- "The Silent Treatment" (Shimmer and Shine), a 2017 episode
