= The Waiting (album) =

Studio album by Royal Wood
- Released: 2010
- Label: Songs of MapleMusic Publishing

Royal Wood chronology
The Lost and Found EP (2009)	The Waiting (2010)	We Were Born to Glory (2012)

The Waiting is a studio album by singer-songwriter Royal Wood, released in 2010, published by Songs of MapleMusic Publishing.

Rachel Sanders of Exclaim! wrote in her review of the album, "With grander arrangements and more conviction in his chocolate-rich vocals, Royal Wood steps up on his third album, confirming his position amongst the cream of Canada's songwriting crop."

== Track listing ==
1. You Can't Go Back
2. Do You Recall
3. Waiting
4. On Top Of Your Love
5. Birds On Sunday
6. The Island
7. A Discovery (We're Lovely)
8. Tonight I Will Be Your Guide
9. Paradise
10. Lady In White
11. When Nothing's Left

== Additional information ==
All songs were written by Royal Wood.

- Tracks 1, 2, and 6 were produced, recorded and mixed by Pierre Marchand
- Tracks 3, 4, 5, 7-11 were produced by Dean Drouillard and Royal Wood
- Tracks 3, 4, 5, 9, and 10 were mixed by Pascal Shefteshy
- Tracks 7, 8, and 11 were mixed by Dean Drouillard

Recorded and engineered by Pascal Sheftshy at Studio PM. Additional recording by Jeff Elliot at BoomBox Sound Studios, Jeremy Darby at Canterbury Sound and Dean Drouillard at Dragon's Den Studio.

- Mastered by Fedge
- Strings arranged by Royal Wood
- Horns on "Birds on Sunday" were arranged by Royal Wood
- Horns on "Tonight I Will Be Your Guide" were arranged by Bryden Baird
- "A Discovery" and "Paradise" arranged by Royal Wood, Dean Drouillard, and Adam Warner
- Royal Wood - vocals, piano, tack piano, acoustic guitar, nylon string guitar, keyboards, rhodes, wurlitzer, synths, marxophone, handclaps
- Dean Drouillard - electric guitar, acoustic guitar, nylon string guitar, marxophone, synths, handclaps
- Adam Warner - drums, percussion, handclaps
- Steve Zsirai - upright bass, electric bass, handclaps
- Karen Graves - 1st violin
- Kathryn Sugden - 2nd violin
- Johann Lotter - viola
- Kevin Fox - cello
- Catherine Le Saunier - cello on "You Can't Go Back"
- David French - tenor saxophone, bass clarinet, flute
- Bryden Baird - trumpet, French horn, flugel horn
- William Carn - trombone

Group vocals on "Lady in White" were performed by Sue Passmore, Courtney Farquhar, Miranda Mulholland, Peter Katz, Dean Drouillard, Ron Leary, Andrew Masse, and Steve Zsirai.
