= Tall Tales =

Tall Tale(s) may refer to:

- Tall tales, stories with unbelievable elements, related as if they were true and factual
- Tall Tales (Royal Wood album), 2004
- Tall Tales (Mark Pritchard and Thom Yorke album), 2025
- Tall Tales, an album by the Hot Club of Cowtown
- Tall Tales from the Magical Garden of Antoon Krings, a 2017 film also released as Tall Tales
- "Tall Tales" (Slow Horses), a 2025 television episode
- "Tall Tales" (Supernatural), a 2007 television episode
- Tall Tale (film), a 1995 fantasy film
- Tall Tales & Legends, an American TV series
