= Lost and Found =

A lost and found is a box or office present in many public areas where visitors can go to retrieve lost articles.

Lost and Found may also refer to:

== Literature ==
- Lost and Found (picture book), a children's picture book by Oliver Jeffers, and a 2008 short film based on it
- Lost and Found (novel), a children's novel by Andrew Clements

== Film ==
- Lost and Found (1979 film), a British comedy starring George Segal and Glenda Jackson
- Lost and Found: The Story of Cook's Anchor, a 1979 television documentary film by David Lean
- Lost and Found (1996 film), a Hong Kong film directed by Lee Chi-Ngai
- Lost & Found (1999 film), an American comedy starring David Spade and Sophie Marceau
- Lost and Found (2005 film), a Bosnia and Herzegovina film
- Lost and Found (2008 film), a Chinese black comedy directed by Ma Liwen
- Lost and Found (2016 Indian film), a Marathi-language film directed by Ruturaj Dhalgade
- Lost & Found (2016 American film), a mystery adventure film directed by Joseph Itaya
- Lost & Found, an Australian animated short film, winner of a 2018 AACTA Award
- Lost & Found (2022 film), a Spanish-Argentine-German thriller film directed by Jorge Dorado

== Television ==
=== Episodes ===
- "Lost and Found" (Barney & Friends), 2007
- "Lost and Found" (Bear in the Big Blue House), 1999
- "Lost & Found" (Craig of the Creek), 2022
- "Lost & Found" (CSI: Crime Scene Investigation), 2010
- "Lost and Found" (Doctors), 2004
- "Lost and Found" (Dora the Explorer), 2000
- "Lost and Found" (Eyes of Wakanda), an episode of Eyes of Wakanda
- "Lost and Found" (Gilmore Girls), 2002
- "Lost and Found" (Haven), 2013
- "Lost and Found" (Melrose Place 1992)
- "Lost and Found" (Mysticons), 2017
- "Lost and Found" (NCIS), 2007
- "Lost and Found" (Parenthood), 2010
- "Lost and Found" (PB&J Otter), 1999
- "Lost and Found" (Pretty Little Liars: The Perfectionists), 2019
- "Lost and Found" (Regular Show), 2016
- "Lost and Found" (Shimmer and Shine), 2016
- "Lost and Found" (Slinger's Day), 1987
- "Lost and Found" (Slow Horses), 2026
- "Lost and Found" (SpongeBob SquarePants), 2017
- "Lost and Found" (Star Trek: Prodigy), 2021
- "Lost and Found" (Supernatural), 2017
- "Lost and Found" (Superstore), 2017
- "Lost and Found" (Touch), 2012
- "Lost and Found" (Transformers: Animated), 2008
- "Lost and Found" (The Twilight Zone), 1986

=== Series ===
- Lost & Found Music Studios, a Canadian musical-drama children's series

== Music ==
=== Albums ===
- Lost & Found (America album), 2015
- Lost & Found (Australian Crawl album), 1996
- Lost and Found (Buena Vista Social Club album), 2015
- Lost and Found (Daniel Johnston album), 2006
- Lost and Found (David Byron album), 2003
- Lost and Found (The Detroit Cobras album), 2007
- Lost & Found (Ian Van Dahl album), 2004
- Lost & Found (Jason & the Scorchers album), 1985
- Lost & Found (Jonsi & Alex album), 2019
- Lost & Found (Jorja Smith album) or the title song, 2018
- Lost & Found (Ledisi album) or the title song, 2007
- Lost and Found (Martine McCutcheon album), 2017
- Lost & Found (Melissa Tkautz album), 2005
- Lost and Found (Mudvayne album), 2005
- Lost and Found (Ralph Towner album), 1995
- Lost & Found (Troy Cassar-Daley album), 2018
- Lost and Found (Will Smith album) or the title song, 2005
- Lost & Found (Jackson Wang mixtape), 2022
- Lost and Found (Tinchy Strider mixtape), 2006
- Lost & Found (soundtrack), 1999
- Lost & Found (1961–62), by the Beach Boys, 1991
- Lost and Found (Volume 2), by Ezio, 2006
- Lost & Found: Hip Hop Underground Soul Classics, by InI and Deda, 2003
- Lost and Found: Love Starved Heart, by Marvin Gaye, 1999
- Lost and Found: You've Got to Earn It (1962–1968), by the Temptations, 1999
- Lost N Found, by JJ Lin, 2011
- Losst and Founnd, by Harry Nilsson, 2019
- Lost & Found, by Earl Slick, 1998
- Lost & Found, by Green Velvet, 2009
- Lost & Found, by Jetboy, 1999
- Lost and Found, by RTZ, 2004
- Lost & Found (1986–1989), by the Kinks, 1991
- Lost and Found: Shadow the Hedgehog Vocal Trax, a Shadow the Hedgehog soundtrack, 2006

=== EPs ===
- Lost & Found (Marilyn Manson EP), 2008
- Lost and Found (IU EP), 2008
- The Lost & Found, by Rasputina, 2001
- The Lost and Found EP, by Royal Wood, 2009
- Lost & Found, by Afrojack, 2009

=== Songs ===
- "Lost and Found" (Brooks & Dunn song), 1991
- "Lost and Found" (Chris Brown song), 2017
- "Lost and Found" (Delerium song), 2007
- "Lost and Found" (Ellie Goulding song), 2015
- "Lost and Found" (Eye Cue song), 2018
- "Lost and Found" (Feeder song), 2006
- "Lost and Found" (The Kinks song), 1986
- "Lost & Found", by Addison Rae from Addison, 2025
- "Lost & Found", by Amon Tobin from ISAM, 2011
- "Lost and Found", by Golden Earring from Cut, 1982
- "Lost and Found", by the Hives, a B-side of "Main Offender", 2001
- "Lost & Found", by Lianne La Havas from Is Your Love Big Enough?, 2012
- "Lost and Found", by the Radio Dept. from Lesser Matters, 2003
- "Lost and Found", by Senses Fail from Still Searching, 2006
- "Lost & Found", by Sick Individuals, 2014
- "Lost & Found", by Taken by Trees from Open Field, 2007
- "Lost and Found", by Train from A Girl, a Bottle, a Boat, 2017

=== Other uses in music ===
- Lost and Found, a 1960s band fronted by Eric Bloom of Blue Öyster Cult
- The Lost and Found Office, a 2011 musical by Jake Brunger and Pippa Cleary
- Lost & Found, a record label founded by Guy J

== Gaming ==
- Lost & Found (video game), an upcoming adventure video game

== See also ==
- "...And Found", an episode of Lost
- "Lost//Found", by Eden from Vertigo, 2018
- Lost, Found, 2018 Chinese film
- Found and Lost (disambiguation)
- History's Lost & Found, an American television series
- Lost and Found and Lost, an album by The Seldon Plan, 2009
- "Lost & Not Found", a song by Chase & Status, 2013
- Lost Property Office, a 2017 animation short film
