= A Good Enough Day =

Studio album by Royal Wood
- Released: 2007
- Label: Dead Daisy

Royal Wood chronology
Tall Tales (2004)	A Good Enough Day (2007)	The Lost and Found EP (2009)

Professional ratings
Review scores
Source	Rating
Toronto Star	3/4 stars

A Good Enough Day is the second album by Canadian singer-songwriter Royal Wood, released in 2007 on Dead Daisy Records.

== Track listing ==
1. "A Good Enough Day"
2. "Juliet"
3. "Safe Haven"
4. "A Mirror Without"
5. "I'm So Glad"
6. "Siren"
7. "In the Garden"
8. "Step Back"
9. "Forever Were Tied"
10. "About You"
11. "Acting Crazy (It's a Breakdown)"
12. "Silently"
