= Burning Bright (disambiguation) =

Burning Bright is a 1950 experimental novella by John Steinbeck.

Burning Bright may also refer to:

- Burning Bright (song), a 2003 single from the post-grunge band Shinedown's debut album Leave a Whisper
- Burning Bright (film), a 2010 horror-thriller directed by Carlos Brooks
- Burning Bright, a 1993 novel by Melissa Scott
- Burning Bright, a 2007 novel by Tracy Chevalier
- "Burning Bright", a song by Phinehas from the 2017 album Dark Flag
- The Burning Bright, a 2014 album by Royal Wood
