= Shimmer and Shine =

Animated television series, 2015–2020

- Genre: Fantasy; Musical; Magical girl
- Created by: Farnaz Esnaashari-Charmatz
- Voices of: Eva Bella; Isabella Cramp; Alina Foley; Blake Bertrand; Justin Felbinger; Ethan Jones; Dee Bradley Baker; Lacey Chabert; Nikki SooHoo
- Narrated by: Melanie Fontana
- Theme music composer: Joachim Svare and Joleen Belle
- Opening theme: "Shimmer and Shine" performed by Melanie Fontana
- Ending theme: "Shimmer and Shine" (instrumental)
- Composer: Bobby Tahouri
- Countries of origin: United States; Canada (season 1)
- Original language: English
- No. of seasons: 4
- No. of episodes: 86 (list of episodes)

Production
- Executive producers: Farnaz Esnaashari-Charmatz; Dave Palmer
- Running time: 21–22 minutes (one half-hour story or two 11-minute stories); 45 minutes (hour-long movies)
- Production companies: Guru Studio (season 1); Xentrix Studios (seasons 2–4); Nickelodeon Animation Studio

Original release
- Network: Nickelodeon (2015–2018); Nick Jr. Channel (2018–2020)
- Release: August 24, 2015 – February 9, 2020

Shimmer and Shine is an animated television series created by Farnaz Esnaashari-Charmatz and produced by Guru Studio on Season 1, Xentrix Studios on Seasons 2–4, and Nickelodeon Animation Studio. It premiered on Nickelodeon's Nick Jr. block on August 24, 2015, and ran for four seasons until February 9, 2020. The show is about twin genie sisters, Shimmer and Shine, who grant wishes for their human friend Leah.

On March 19, 2018, new episodes moved to the separate Nick Jr. Channel.

== Plot ==
The first season is set in the human world and focuses on a young girl named Leah who is friends with twin genie sisters named Shimmer and Shine. Each day, the genies grant Leah three wishes, but they often make mistakes. Each episode features Leah working together with the genies to resolve the problems they unintentionally cause, all while keeping Shimmer and Shine a secret from her next door neighbor and best friend Zac.

In the second season, the characters are transported to Zahramay Falls, a magical land where Shimmer and Shine live. Leah reveals her genies' existence to Zac, who is given a genie of his own, named Kaz. Shimmer and Shine continue to grant Leah wishes in Zahramay Falls and befriend the sovereign of the land, Princess Samira. The season includes Samira's pet peacock, Roya and Leah's pet fox, Parisa. Also, Zeta, a villainous sorceress, and finally, Zeta's dragon, Nazboo.

== Episodes ==
Season	Segments	Episodes	Originally released	
Season	Segments	Episodes	First released	Last released
1	19	20	August 24, 2015	May 11, 2016
2	38	20	June 15, 2016	March 31, 2017
3	37	20	May 5, 2017	November 20, 2018
4	48	26	October 20, 2018	February 9, 2020

== Characters ==
=== Humans and genies ===
- Shimmer (voiced by Eva Bella in the US, and Mia Wiltshire in the UK) is an optimistic genie with peach skin, blue eyes, cyan jewels, a purple genie outfit and cold red ponytailed hair. She is enthusiastic and encouraging. She loves cleaning, unlike her older sister, playing the tuba, and collecting genie bottles, and glitter.
- Shine (voiced by Isabella Cramp in the US, Elie Simons and Mia Hope in the UK) is a courageous genie with peach skin, purple eyes, pink jewels, a teal genie outfit with yellow shoes and blue ponytailed hair. She is an animal lover and is often hungry. Her pet is a Bengal tiger cub named Nahal. Due to her love of animals, she is very knowledgeable about the behaviors of magical creatures native to Zahramay Falls. Unlike her younger sister, she hates cleaning. A running gag involves Shine saying "It's like I always say..." only to humorously reveal that she has just made up whatever she says next.
- Leah (voiced by Alina Foley in the US, and Claudia Burns in the UK) is a long blonde haired girl with green eyes, fair skin who owns a genie bottle necklace on her pink shirt, which includes Shimmer and Shine. Although Shimmer and Shine usually mess up her wishes, Leah is patient and forgiving. Originally, she is forced to keep her genie's existence a secret from her close friend Zac, but reveals her secret to him after being transported to Zahramay Falls. In the second season, Princess Samira grants Shine, Shimmer, Leah and Zac's wish to visit Zahramay Falls whenever they want. While in Zahramay Falls, Leah magically dons a genie disguise to avoid detection, as humans are not normally allowed in the falls.
- Zac (voiced by Blake Bertrand in the first two seasons, Justin Felbinger, and later Ethan Jones in seasons three and four in the US, and Innis Robertson-Pinnel in the UK) is Leah's neighbor with red hair and blue eyes, and best human friend. In the first season, he is oblivious to the fact that Leah has genies. Whenever something strange or unusual happens, he responds to it in a carefree manner. He also has a habit of telling humorous experiences he has had to Leah. In the second season, he learns that Leah has genies and gets a genie of his own named Kaz.
- Princess Samira (voiced by Nikki SooHoo in the US, and Cariad Lloyd in the UK) is the ruler of Zahramay Falls and oversees all genies in training. She can grant wishes along with the younger genies. She occasionally rewards genies with magic Genie Gems that can have a variety of magical effects. She acts as Shimmer and Shine's mentor and teacher. Despite Zeta being her self-proclaimed rival, Samira likes Zeta and is willing to give her a second chance at becoming a genie-in-training, which in season three is revealed to be due to her past friendship with Zeta when they were both students under Empress Caliana.
- Zeta the Sorceress (voiced by Lacey Chabert in the US and the UK) is a resident of Zahramay Falls with green eyes and purple hair, who is the main villain and Princess Samira's rival and wishes to replace her as the most powerful person in Zahramay Falls. Zeta is a sorceress instead of a genie, as she has no desire to grant the wishes of others, relying on magic potions and magical items.
- Kaz (voiced by Jet Jurgensmeyer in the US, and Harrison Noble in the UK) is a genie in training who becomes Zac's genie in the second season. In contrast to Zac's easy-going and adventurous personality, Kaz is more cautious and scared easily. Despite their contrasting personalities, Zac and Kaz work well together and the latter can be brave when he has to be. His cautious nature also means he puts more thought into how he grants Zac's wishes. Kaz has a pet Ziffilon named Zain, who summoned by one of Zac's wishes after he learned that Kaz always wanted a Ziffilon as a pet.
- Empress Caliana (voiced by Barbara Eden) is Princess Samira's mentor and gave her her necklace when she was a genie-in-training. Empress Caliana was an explorer when she was young and made many groundbreaking discoveries, such as finding the Caliana Caves. Caliana is voiced by Barbara Eden, who previously played the title character (a genie) in the 1960s sitcom, I Dream of Jeannie.
- Captain Zora (voiced by Kellie Pickler from the season two finale, Kate Higgins from seasons three to four) is a pirate genie who is Shine's idol. She is absentminded at times and can be very clumsy and forgetful, especially when she is on an adventure. She owns a flying pirate ship that she sometimes accidentally docks in odd places.
- Layla (voiced by Danica McKellar) is an ice genie who is a good friend of Princess Samira. She possesses an ice gem necklace that gives her freezing powers and keeps her body cold.
- Shaya (voiced by Kin Santiago in Season 2 through 3 and Hudson West) is a lightning genie in training who rides around on a flying cloud-board and can generate magical lightning. Though he is reluctant to work with Leah and her genies at first, he eventually learns the value of teamwork from them.
- Nila (voiced by Mila Brener in the US, and Kimani Arthur in the UK) is a mermaid who lives in the waters near Zahramay Falls. Leah and her genies befriend Nila after Leah wishes to find a mermaid after learning they are real. She helps the girls obtain the Mermaid Gem, which allows them to transform into mermaids at will.
- Imma (voiced by Grace Kaufman) is the Waterfall Genie who oversees the source of the rainbow waterfalls of Zahramay Falls.
- Wishy Washy Genie (voiced by Fred Tatasciore) is a male genie whose powerful magic is used to remove or fix a wish that cannot be used on other genies.
- Ayla (voiced by Liliana Mumy) is a hair-changing genie who has the power to change hairstyles.
- Minu (voiced by Kitana Turnbull) is a flitter flutter genie.
- Afina (voiced by Julie Nathanson) is the Glitter Genie who lives in a glittery palace on a cloud in Rainbow Zarahmay.
- Princess Ula (voiced by Tatyana Ali) is the ruler of Rainbow Zarahmay. She is also the Gem Princess in charge of giving all the Genie Gems their magic.
- Nadia (voiced by Brittany Snow in Season 3 and Lana McKissack in Season 4) is the Dream Genie who is the only genie capable of granting wishes involving dreams and specializes in dream magic which involve using magic dust. She is also in charge of crafting special dreams for everyone in Zahramay Falls. As a result, she knows about everyone in Zahramay Falls. However it is rare for her to make dreams actually come true.
- Ezri (voiced by Gunnar Sizemore) is Nadia's assistant who like Nadia knows about everybody in Zahramay Falls as he recognizes Leah, Shimmer, Shine, and even Zeta on first meeting them.
- Misha (voiced by Jewel in Season 3 and Kailey Snider in Season 4) – The Animal Genie who helps all the genies in Zarahmay Falls find their pets.
- Princess Adara (voiced by Tania Gunadi) is the beautiful stardust princess of Zarahmay Skies.
- Rubi (voiced by Luna Bella) is the Rainbow Genie of Zarahmay Skies.
- Shaun (voiced by Ramone Hamilton) is Shaya's twin brother who's a cloud genie.

=== Animals ===
All animals in the series are voiced by Dee Bradley Baker.

- Tala is Shimmer's pet gibbon.
- Nahal is Shine's Bengal tiger cub.
- Rocket is Zac's pet beagle who appears in several episodes of the first season and he does not appear in the entirely of season 2 reappears in the third season. He did not appear in the entire season two. He is a rambunctious dog with a tendency to drool and chew on things which often causes trouble, though is simply an overly playful pouch who means no real harm.
- Nazboo is Zeta's talking pet dragon, who caters to her every need and acts as Zeta's underling. He is somewhat clumsy and often accidentally causes Zeta's schemes to backfire. He can also get easily distracted by food or anything that piques his interest. In the third season, he is revealed to be from Manetikar, the land of dragons, and befriended Zeta when she came to Manetikar to find a dragon for a pet. Feeling sorry for Zeta after her attempt to make one of the larger flying dragons her pet failed, he agreed to become her pet.
- Roya is Princess Samira's pet peacock, who resides in her palace. Roya is the polar opposite of Shimmer and Shine's pets, as she would much rather show off her feathers or practice walking gracefully than play or dance. Unlike Samira, Roya has a strong dislike for Zeta and Nazboo, to the point of literally chasing them out of Samira's Palace on one occasion. Once a year, she sheds a special feather with the ability to repair any magical object.
- Parisa is Leah's pet fox who possesses the ability to camouflage herself, making her practically invisible. She is the second pet native to Leah and Zac’s world overall. Parisa is a purple, common earth fox and is introduced midway through the second season.
- Zain is Kaz's pet Ziffilon (a griffin-like creature). Kaz had always wanted a pet Ziffilon before getting Zain, so Zac uses one of his wishes to wish up a Ziffilon for Kaz. Zain is by far the largest of the pets, as he is big enough for Kaz to ride on his back, though despite his size Zain gets scared easily even more so than Kaz.
- Zoomicorns are winged unicorns native to Zahramay Falls and Rainbow Zahramay introduced in the second season. They are friendly and helpful creatures who occasionally aid the girls and allow them to ride them. The only known named Zoomicorn is Gleam, who lives in Rainbow Zahramay.
- Scallywag is the magical pet of Captain Zora, who helps Zora remember things that she forgets such as names and the meaning of words and phrases used by pirates. Scallywag flies around by spinning her tail in helicopter like fashion. Her magic goes out of control when scared, causing random magic effects.
- Nazboo's three siblings, Razboo, Kazboo, and Frank, are introduced in the third season. They are all small flightless dragons that resemble Nazboo in appearance and share his friendly, playful nature as well as his love of food and tummy rubs.
- Lulu is Misha's pet Panda.
- Zahrora, Zoomdust, and Zadazzle are three Zahracorns. Shimmer's one is Zahrora, Shine's one Zoomdust and Leah's one Zadazzle.
- Dahliza is Princess Adara's Zahracorn.
- Fuzzle Whuzzles are little creatures in Rainbow Zarahmay.
- Azah is Rubi's Zahracorn.

== Production ==
Shimmer and Shine is based on an unreleased pilot that took six months to develop in 2013, with a reported completion date of September 2013. The pilot was created by Farnaz Esnaashari-Charmatz, who previously worked on Dora the Explorer, with Sindy Boveda Spackman as the writer and Andy Bialk as the art director. It was ordered to series by Nickelodeon in March 2014, with the first season to consist of 20 episodes. The series premiered on August 24, 2015.

On February 15, 2016, it was announced that Shimmer and Shine was renewed for a 20-episode second season that uses CGI animation, with the second season premiering in the United States on June 10, 2016. On June 20, 2016, Shimmer and Shine was renewed for a third season of an additional 20 episodes. The third season premiered on May 5, 2017.

On May 22, 2017, Shimmer and Shine was renewed for a fourth season consisting of 20 episodes. The fourth season premiered October 22, 2018. Season 4 was eventually increased to 26 episodes.

== Broadcast ==
Shimmer and Shine premiered on Nick Jr. UK on 9 November 2015, where it was dubbed with British voice actors, replacing the original American soundtrack (though Zeta and the animals' voices remained unchanged).

== Merchandise ==
=== Books ===
Nickelodeon and Random House Children's Books released books based on the show starting in January 2016.

=== DVDs ===
Nickelodeon, with Paramount for Region 1 and with Universal / Sony for Region 4, have released a number of DVDs based on the show.

DVD name	Episodes	Release date
Shimmer & Shine	"Genie Treehouse"; "Ahoy Genie"; "Sweetest Thing"; "Light Camera Genie"; "What A Pig Mess"; "Abracagenie"; "Dino Might"	Region 1: February 2, 2016; Region 2 (UK): October 3, 2016; Region 4: November 2, 2016
Welcome To The Zahramay Falls	"Welcome To The Zahramay Falls"; "The First Wish Part 1"; "The First Wish Part 2"; "Happy Wishaversary"	Region 1: August 16, 2016; Region 2 (UK): January 30, 2017; Region 4: June 14, 2017
Friendship Divine	"Mermaid Mayhem"; "Zoom Zahramay"; "Treemendous Rescue"; "Freezeamay Falls"; "Lightning In A Bottle"; "All Bottled Up"; "Double Trouble"; "Bling Bling"	Region 1: February 7, 2017; Region 2 (UK): July 17, 2017; Region 4: September 6, 2017
Magical Pet Of Zahramay Falls (Region 1); Playful Pet Of Zahramay Falls (Region 2 & 4)	"Unnamed Talent"; "Pet Bedroom"; "Zany Ziffilon"; "Now You See Her"; "Dragon Pox"; "Bungle In The Jungle"; "Potion Control"; "Boom Zahra Mom"	Region 1: August 22, 2017; Region 2 (UK): July 16, 2018; Region 2 (South Africa): September 14, 2018; Region 4: April 11, 2018
Magical Flight	"Wild Carpet Chase"; "Flying Flour"; "Spaceship Wrecked"; "Starry Night Sleepover"; "Snow Place We Rather Be"; "Dream Dollhouse"	Region 1: _; Region 4: November 15, 2017
Magical Mischief	"Silent Treatment"; "Zoomicorn Toss"; "Genie For A Day"; "Crystal Queen"; "Size Of The Beholder"; "The Glob"; "Easy As Pie"; "Samira & Zeta"	Region 1: _; Region 4: June 13, 2018
Beyond The Rainbow Falls	"Rainbow Zahramay"; "The Darpoppy"; "Hairdos & Don't"; "Flower Power"; "All The Glitter"; "Waterbent"; "Whatever Float Your Boat"	Region 1: February 6, 2018; Region 4: September 26, 2018
Dance Like A Genie	"Dance Magic"; "Backyard Ballet"; "Nazboo Magic Kazoo"; "Masquerade Charade"; "Grab That Gem"; "Carpet Trouble"	Region 1: _; Region 4: April 3, 2019
Flight Of The Zahracorn	"Welcome To The Zahramay Skies"; "Pet To The Rescue"; "The Zahra Star"; "Rainbow To The Rescue"; "Zahracorn Tickles"; "Zahracorn Salon"; "The Dragon Zahracorn"	Region 1: February 5, 2019; Region 4: September 25, 2019
Legend Of The Dragon Treasure	"Legend Of The Dragon Treasure"; "Dragon Rider"; "Zahracorn On Parade"; "Nazboo Magic Robe"; "Dragon Tale"; "Nazboo Family Reunion"	Region 1: August 20, 2019; Region 4: June 17, 2020 [Scheduled]
Splash Into The Zahramay Oceania	"Journey To Zahramay Oceania"; "Sea Enchantress"; "Dance Like A Jellyfish"; "Zeashell Surprise"; "Zahramay Zuffer Puff"; "Zeacorn Cove"; "Light In Oceania"	Region 1: January 21, 2020

Nickelodeon, with Paramount for Region 1 and with Universal / Sony for Region 4, released a number of DVDs featuring one episode from a variety of the animated television series they have produced, including "Shimmer & Shine", "Blaze and the Monster Machines", "Blue's Clues", "Bubble Guppies", "Dora and Friends: Into the City!", "Fresh Beat Band of Spies", "Paw Patrol", "Rusty Rivets", "Sunny Day", "Top Wing" and "Wallykazam!", on average 6 on each DVD.

DVD name	Episodes	Release date
Nick Jr The Great Big Birthday Bash	"Boom Zahra Bake"; "Masquerade Charade"	Region 1: June 4, 2019; Region 2 (UK) : July 15, 2019; Region 4: August 28, 2019
Nickelodeon Favorites Whisker & Paw	"Abracagenie"	Region 1: January 26, 2016
Nickelodeon Favorites A Very Nick Jr. Christmas	"Santa Little Genie"	Region 1: October 11, 2016

Shimmer and Shine episodes featured as bonus episodes in the DVD releases of other animated television series that Nickelodeon produced, primarily with Universal / Sony for Region 4, including "Paw Patrol" and "Nella the Princess Knight"

DVD name	Episodes	Release date
Paw Patrol Summer Rescue	"Volcano Draino"	Region 4: January 16, 2019
Nella the Princess Knight Royal Quest	"Staffinated"	Region 4: June 19, 2019

=== Toys ===
Nickelodeon and Fisher-Price released a toy line based on the show. Mega Bloks playlets based on the show have been released.

== See also ==
- Guru Studio
- Curious Pictures
