= Found and Lost =

Found and Lost may refer to:

- Found and Lost (opera), a 2016 opera by Emily Hall
- "Found and Lost" (Second Thoughts), a 1991 television episode
- "Found and Lost" (Twilight Zone), a 2002 television episode
- Found & Lost, a 2012 album by Pipes and Pints

== See also ==
- Lost and Found
