= We Were Born to Glory =

Studio album by Royal Wood
- Released: 2012
- Label: Songs of MapleMusic Publishing

Royal Wood chronology
| The Waiting (2010) | We Were Born to Glory (2012) | The Burning Bright (2014) |

We Were Born to Glory is a studio album by Canadian singer-songwriter Royal Wood, released in 2012, published by Songs of MapleMusic Publishing. The album debuted in the Top 25 on the Canadian Albums Chart, and was nominated for Adult Alternative Album of the Year at the 2013 Juno Awards. The first single from the album was "Not Giving Up".

== Track listing ==
1. "The Thick Of It" (3:22)
2. "The Fire Did Go" (3:42)
3. "Not Giving Up" (4:23)
4. "Will We Ever Learn" (4:32)
5. "I Want Your Love" (3:31)
6. "When The Sun Comes Up" (3:25)
7. "I'll Be Gone" (4:56)
8. "Always Will" (4:15)
9. "I Need You Now" (3:23)
10. "Brand New Life" (4:18)
11. "Hard Thing to Find" (3:07)
12. "Release Me" (3:53)
