= The Silent Treatment (Mark Deutrom album) =

Studio album by Mark Deutrom
- Released: April 16, 2001
- Recorded: March 1998
- Genre: Alternative metal; stoner rock; experimental rock; psychedelic rock
- Length: 52:24
- Label: Tee Pee

Mark Deutrom chronology
The Silent Treatment (2001)	The Gate (2006)

Professional ratings
Review scores
Source	Rating
AllMusic	3/5 stars

The Silent Treatment is an album by Mark Deutrom, released in 2001 through Tee Pee Records.

== Track listing ==
1. "Toshiro Mifune"
2. "The Hobnail Paisley"
3. "El Morocco"
4. "One Thousand Delights"
5. "Chihuahua"
6. "Coffinmakers Complaint"
7. "Fat Hamlet"
8. "The Hottentot Venus"
9. "Borehole"
10. "Your Necklace"
11. "Revelator"
12. "A Catastrophe"
13. "Honey Drop"
14. "Gateau D'amour"
15. "Van Diemen's Land"
16. "Candlelight and Wisteria"

== Personnel ==
- Mark Deutrom – Etcetera
- John Evans – drums
