= Tall Tales (Royal Wood album) =

Studio album by Royal Wood
- Released: 2004
- Label: Dead Daisy

Royal Wood chronology
The Milkweed EP (2002)	Tall Tales (2004)	A Good Enough Day (2007)

Tall Tales is the full-length debut album by Canadian pop singer-songwriter Royal Wood, released in 2004.

== Track listing ==
1. "The Spirits and I"
2. "Once"
3. "Sway"
4. "Suzanne"
5. "Weigh Me Down"
6. "Under the Years"
7. "The Wonder"
8. "The Scene"
9. "The Roaming Sky"
10. "Balloon"
11. "A Perfect Ending"
