= The Burning Bright =

Studio album by Royal Wood
- Released: March 18, 2014
- Label: Songs of MapleMusic Publishing

Royal Wood chronology
We Were Born to Glory (2012)	The Burning Bright (2014)	I Wish You Well (2014)

The Burning Bright is a studio album by singer-songwriter Royal Wood, released by Songs of MapleMusic Publishing. The album was released on March 18, 2014. The lead single, "Forever and Ever", was a top 40 hit in Canada and was the No. 1 most added song on Hot AC Radio.

The Burning Bright was followed three months after its initial release by a companion album called I Wish You Well featuring remixes of songs from The Burning Bright.
