= Royal Wood =

Canadian musician

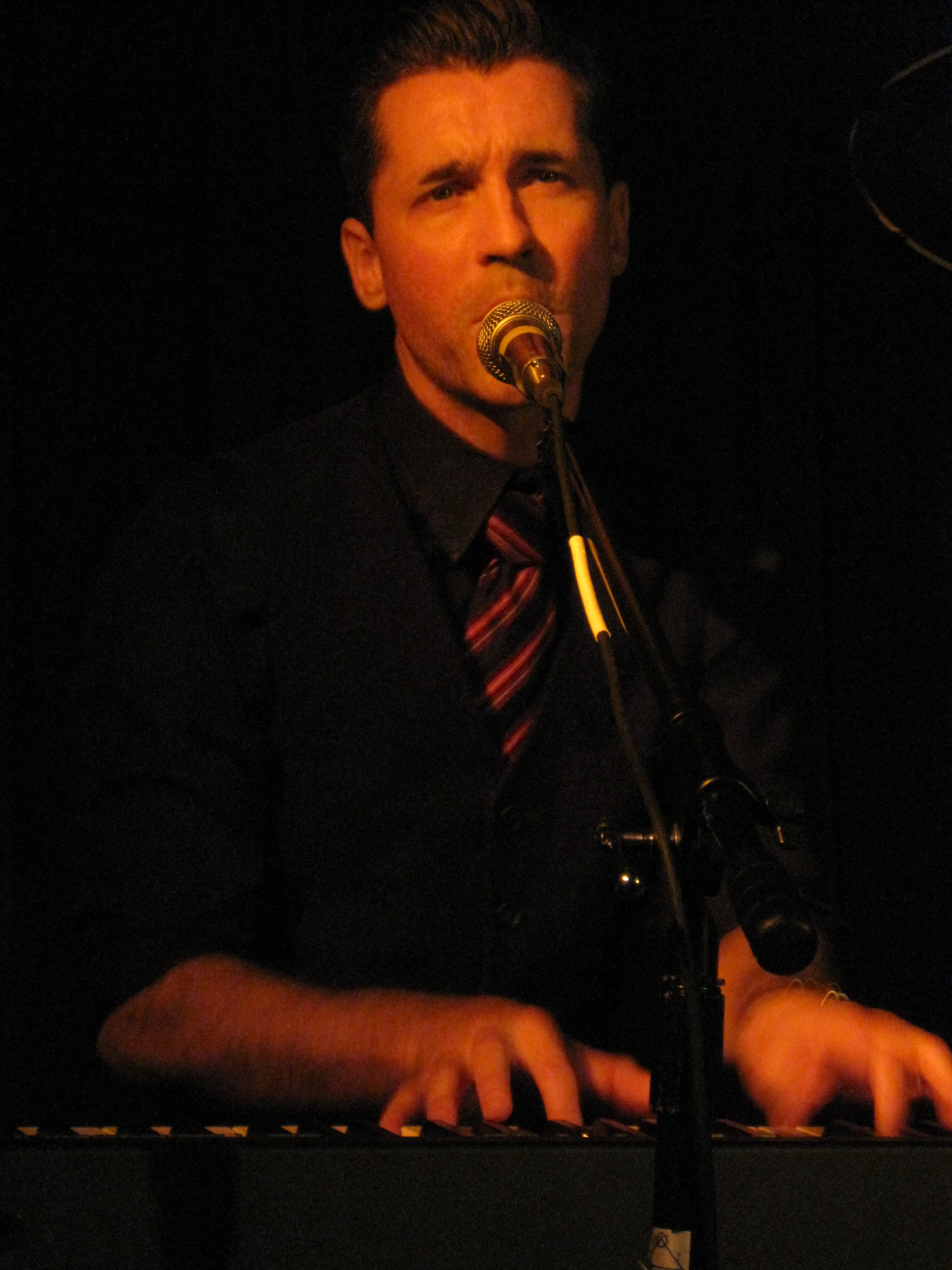
- Wood in 2009

Background information
- Born: John Royal Wood Nicholson
- Origin: Lakefield, Ontario, Canada
- Genre: Pop rock
- Occupation: Musician
- Instruments: Vocals; guitar; piano
- Years active: 2002–present
- Label: MapleMusic
- Website: royalwood.ca

Royal Wood (born John Royal Wood Nicholson) is a Juno-nominated Canadian musician and record producer based in Toronto, Ontario. To date, he has released eight studio albums, three EPs, and one live record.

== Biography ==
=== Early life ===
Wood was born John Royal Wood Nicholson and raised in Lakefield, Ontario. Royal Wood, his performing name and his real middle names, were chosen in memory of his great-grandfather, Royal Rufus Wood, who died in 1962.

Wood grew up in a household filled with music; his brother Luke Nicholson is also a singer-songwriter. He began playing piano by ear at the age of four and started lessons at age eight. With the support of his school music program, he had access to a variety of different instruments, and by his teens, he became a multi-instrumentalist who could play the guitar, bass, drums, clarinet, and trumpet.

After high school, Wood studied business at McGill University. During this time, he performed piano in Montreal jazz clubs and focused on his guitar playing while trying to find his voice as a songwriter.

=== Career ===
Wood released his first EP, entitled The Milkweed EP, in 2002. This collection of songs was written, arranged, and produced by Wood himself.

Following this, Wood set out to create an over-the-top pop record for his full-length debut. Drawing inspiration from the Beatles and the Beach Boys, he once again undertook production duties during the recording sessions. In 2004, Wood released Tall Tales on Maple Music. The record's ornate sound and layered arrangements garnered much critical attention, and Wood was praised for his vocal style and "infectious lyricism".

With the goal of creating a more mature sound, the artist entered Toronto's Reaction Studios in 2005 to begin recording his next album. During the recording sessions, he used a Steinway grand piano, scored a full string quartet, and also enlisted the help of many well-known musicians, including Hawksley Workman and Kurt Swinghammer. The result was A Good Enough Day, which was released in 2007 on Dead Daisy Records in Canada, and in 2008 on Rounder Europe. The record spawned three singles and three music videos: "A Mirror Without", "Juliet", and "I'm So Glad". Music from the record has also been featured on several TV and movie soundtracks, including TMN/Movie Central's ReGenesis, the CBC series This Is Wonderland, the CTV movie Playing House, the film The End of Silence, and the Food Network's The Surreal Gourmet. Internationally, "A Mirror Without" was featured on an episode of Grey's Anatomy. The song "Paradise" was also featured on an episode of Private Practice.

With the success of A Good Enough Day, Wood was invited to share the stage with numerous Canadian musicians, including Emm Gryner, Sarah Harmer, Kathleen Edwards, Sarah Slean, Jill Barber, and Serena Ryder. In support of the Rounder Europe release of the record, he also embarked on a European tour in 2008.

On his next record, Wood wanted to focus on lyrics and string arrangements. The result was the 2009 album The Lost and Found EP. With a consistently growing fan base, Wood embarked on his first headlining tour of Western Canada in November 2009, joined by Atlantic Canadian singer-songwriter Rose Cousins.

In 2010, he released The Waiting, after which iTunes Canada named him one of their iTunes Songwriters of the Year. That same year, he was also nominated at the Junos for Songwriter of the Year. He supported David Gray on a full national tour and completed three headline tours of Canada, as well as others in Europe and the US.

His 2012 album, We Were Born to Glory, debuted in the Top 25 on the Canadian Albums Chart, and was nominated for Adult Alternative Album of the Year at the 2013 Juno Awards. The first single from the album was "Not Giving Up".

On March 18, 2014, Wood released The Burning Bright. The lead single, "Forever and Ever", was a Top 40 hit in Canada. In June 2014, he released a companion album, I Wish You Well, which included five new songs and four original mixes from the previous album. The record was a collaboration with Dean Drouillard, while much of the material was inspired by Wood's stay in County Meath, Ireland.

Wood released Ghost Light in 2016 to positive reviews, including the Irish Times naming it one of the "Best Albums of the Year". The lead single, "Long Way Out", found its way into the CBC Music Top 20. It was released internationally on Outside Music in 2017. The momentum of Ghost Light and Wood's career successes led him to be the "very special guest" on Bonnie Raitt's national Canadian tour in 2017.

The artist released his latest album, Ever After the Farewell, in April 2018. The lead single, "California Nights", made the Radio 2 Top 20. The world tour highlights included headlining Massey Hall in Toronto, the Winspear Centre in Edmonton, and the Rebecca Cohn Auditorium in Halifax. A companion EP, called Love Will Linger, was released on October 26, 2018. In 2021, Wood released a live recording of his performance at Massey Hall, titled Live at Massey Hall.

== Personal life ==
In 2008, Wood and fellow singer-songwriter Sarah Slean got engaged in Paris; the pair married in 2009. In January 2014, Slean announced she and Wood had "parted ways as friends".

Wood married Alison Waldbauer in 2017. They live in Toronto's Liberty Village neighbourhood. Wood also owns his parents' farm near Peterborough.

== Discography ==
=== Studio albums ===
- Tall Tales (2004)
- A Good Enough Day (2007)
- The Waiting (2010)
- We Were Born to Glory (2012)
- The Burning Bright (2014)
- I Wish You Well (2014)
- Ghost Light (2016)
- Ever After the Farewell (2018)
- What Tomorrow Brings (2022)
- Dear John (2025)

=== EPs ===
- The Milkweed EP (2003)
- The Lost and Found EP (2009)
- Love Will Linger EP (2018)
- Just Another Day (2023)

=== Live albums ===
- Royal Wood – Live at Massey Hall (2021)

=== DVDs ===
- Royal Wood – Live at the Grand (2015)

=== Compilations ===
- Memory Lane (Rarities & B-Sides) (2024)
