= List of Shimmer and Shine episodes =

Shimmer and Shine is an American-Canadian animated television series, created by Farnaz Esnaashari-Charmatz. It airs on Nickelodeon in the United States and on Treehouse in Canada. It premiered on Nickelodeon on August 24, 2015, and four seasons of the series have aired. The first three seasons contain twenty episodes and fourth contains twenty-six, not including an unaired pilot from 2013. The first season used hand-drawn animation, with the series switching to CGI animation with its second season.

Shimmer and Shine was ordered to series by Nickelodeon in March 2014, with the first season to consist of 20 episodes. On February 15, 2016, it was announced that the series was renewed for a 20-episode second season, which premiered on June 15, 2016, and switched to CGI. On June 20, 2016, it was renewed for a third season to consist of 20 episodes, which premiered on May 5, 2017. On May 22, 2017, Shimmer and Shine was renewed for a fourth season also to consist of 20 episodes but was later expanded to include 26 episodes and premiered on October 20, 2018.

== Series overview ==
Season	Segments	Episodes	Originally released	
Season	Segments	Episodes	First released	Last released
1	19	20	August 24, 2015	May 11, 2016
2	38	20	June 15, 2016	March 31, 2017
3	37	20	May 5, 2017	November 20, 2018
4	48	26	October 20, 2018	February 9, 2020

== Episodes ==
=== Season 1 (2015–16) ===
This is the only season to use 2D animation.

No. overall	No. in season	Title	Directed by	Written by	Storyboard by	U.S. air date	Canadian air date	Prod. code	U.S. viewers (millions)
1	1	"The Sweetest Thing"	Jay Baker	Sindy Boveda Spackman	Fred Gonzales, Stephen Heneveld, Jon Magram, Julius Aquimatang, Maureen Mascarina, Kartika Mediani and Pete Mekis	August 24, 2015	October 3, 2015	103	1.80
When Leah wishes for help making cupcakes for a bake sale, she and the genies find themselves stuck with a giant birthday cake, some farm animals, and a river of cupcake batter.
2	2	"Genie Treehouse"	Jay Baker	Whitney Wetta	Marcelo De Souza, Miguel Puga, Julius Aguimatang, Kaukab Basheer, Richard Gaines, Maureen Mascarina, Kartika Mediani, Pete Mekis and Angelica Russell	August 26, 2015	September 13, 2015	105	1.34
Leah and Zac try building a treehouse but find themselves in over their heads. Leah asks her genies for a treehouse and is thrown for a loop when Shimmer and Shine turn her house into a house of trees.
3	3	"Lights! Camera! Genies!"	Scott O'Brien	Whitney Wetta	Jay Baker and Brian Hatfield	September 1, 2015	September 13, 2015	108	1.32
Leah and Zac are about to watch "The Dragon Princess" on TV, but Shimmer and Shine end up making the movie's characters real.
4	4	"What a Pig Mess"	Scott O'Brien	Lacey Dyer	Marcelo De Souza, David Knott and Miguel Puga	September 3, 2015	October 11, 2015	106	1.09
When Leah ask her genies for more pigs in a blanket for the party, they give her real pigs wrapped in a blanket and the piglets cause trouble. The pigs are given a bath.
5	5	"Abraca-Genie"	Dave Cunningham	Whitney Wetta	Fred Gonzales and Jon Magram	September 8, 2015	October 17, 2015	110	0.88
Zac wants to do magic tricks in his show, so Leah asks Shimmer and Shine to help.
6	6	"Ahoy, Genies!"	Scott O'Brien	Joshua Hamilton and Whitney Wetta	Fred Gonzales and Jon Magram	September 10, 2015	October 18, 2015	107	0.66
When Leah's bucket full of beach treasures floats into the vast ocean, Leah summons Shimmer and Shine to help her retrieve the loot, but instead they wish up a treasure map to search for treasure.
7	7	"Dino Might!"	Scott O'Brien	Gabe Pulliam and Whitney Wetta	Marcelo De Souza and Miguel Puga	October 2, 2015	October 25, 2015	104	0.67
When Zac loses his favorite toy dinosaur, Leah calls her genies to make a new one. However, they end up turning the toy into a real dinosaur.
8	8	"A Very Genie Halloweenie"	Jay Baker	Whitney Wetta	Fred Gonzales and Jon Magram	October 23, 2015	October 24, 2015	113	0.93
A Halloween special. Leah invites Shimmer and Shine to make a haunted house for the contest of Halloween. Leah also takes advantage of the holiday to introduce Zac to Shimmer and Shine, as friends of hers dressed as genies.
9	9	"Backyard Ballet"	Jay Baker	Lacey Dyer	Natalie Long	November 6, 2015	November 21, 2015	109	1.11
Leah wants to be the queen from Swan Lake and her wishing for it causes the twins to conjure six swans in her house. They move for a ballet in her backyard.
10	10	"Game On"	Scott O'Brien	Jennifer Bardekoff	Dave Cunningham and Natalie Long	November 20, 2015	November 28, 2015	115	1.01
Leah and Zac save up for months to get the big prize at the arcade, but the ticket counting machine malfunctions.
11	11	"Santa's Little Genies"	Scott O'Brien	Sindy Boveda Spackman	Dave Cunningham and Natalie Long	December 11, 2015	December 28, 2015	111	0.82
A Christmas special. Leah, Shimmer, and Shine visit the North Pole and finds Santa Claus' workshop — and Santa himself. However, when the genies accidentally send him on vacation, they have to work together to get presents to the children along with Leah. Guest voice: Carl Reiner as Santa Claus.
12	12	"Spaceship Wrecked"	Jay Baker	Lacey Dyer	Marcelo De Souza, David Knott and Miguel Puga	January 15, 2016	February 20, 2016	112	0.80
Shimmer and Shine poof up a friendly alien into Leah's backyard.
13	13	"Happy Wishaversary"	Carin-Anne Anderson	Dustin Ferrer	Natalie Long and Cynthia Petrovic	February 12, 2016	February 28, 2016	120	1.07
Shimmer and Shine make Leah a friendship bracelet for their first "wishaversary" (means anniversary). However, it turns out to be magical when Rocket starts chewing on it, causing him to float.
14	14	"Sleep-Over Party"	Carin-Anne Anderson	Lacey Dyer	Marcelo De Souza, Kartika Mediani and Miguel Puga	March 15, 2016	April 13, 2016	114	0.86
Shimmer and Shine have their first ever sleepover at Leah's house. Meanwhile, Zac stays up late outside with Rocket to watch a meteor shower.
15	15	"Dream Dollhouse"	Scott O'Brien	Sindy Boveda Spackman	Dave Cunningham, Natalie Long and Cynthia Petrovic	March 17, 2016	April 16, 2016	118	1.07
Leah wishes that she had dolls in her dollhouse, but the genies shrink themselves to the size of a doll.
16	16	"Gone Bowlin'"	Jay Baker	Whitney Wetta	Marcelo De Souza and Miguel Puga	April 5, 2016	May 6, 2016	116	0.94
Leah and Zac go bowling, and when Shimmer and Shine start to play (secretly), the two cause mayhem.
17	17	"The Great Skate Mistake"	Carin-Anne Anderson	Lacey Dyer	Fred Gonzales and Cynthia Petrovic	April 7, 2016	May 9, 2016	117	0.97
Leah visits Zac are at the skate park, while Shimmer and Shine help her make a skateboard. However, the genies make her a surfboard with wheels added instead.
18	18	"Escape Goat"	Jay Baker	Ryan Levin	Dave Knott, Rick Ritter and Brad Vandergrift	April 29, 2016	May 14, 2016	119	1.07
While visiting a local petting zoo, a goat escapes and Leah and her genies follow it.
19–20	19–20	"My Secret Genies (also known as "The First Wish")"	Jay Baker	Sindy Boveda-Spackman	Jim Baker, Fred Gonzales, Brian Hatfield, Stephen Heneveld, David Knott and Jon Magram	May 11, 2016	June 4, 2016	101-102	1.09
Part 1: Shimmer and Shine and their pets looking at the scrapbook for their memories and Shimmer liked the picture of them and Leah hugging and started to remember when they have a first met and in the flashback that it started last year when Shine cannot sleep. Then they started to find five ingredients for the new bottle in scratch. Leah wins a genie bottle necklace at a carnival and is surprised to find that her prize comes with a bonus — genies Shimmer and Shine. Part 2: Things get more complicated when Leah uses up her remaining wishes to keep Zac from seeing the elephant, resulting in a polka-dotted elephant on roller skates and a giant bounce castle. Note: This was aired as a 1-hour special. It is also the last episode to use 2D animation.

=== Season 2 (2016–17) ===
Starting with this season, the remainder of the series now uses CGI animation, with the addition of two eleven-minute segments each (except for "Welcome to Zahramay Falls" and "The Pirate Genie"), rather than usually a 22-minute episode.

No. overall	No. in season	Title	Directed by	Written by	Storyboard by	U.S. air date	Canadian air date	Prod. code	U.S. viewers (millions)
21	1	"Welcome to Zahramay Falls"	Matt Engstrom	Stephanie Simpson	Richard Gaines and Angelica Russell	June 15, 2016	June 11, 2016	899	1.76
The genies are summoned by Princess Samira who presents them with a magical Green Burst Gem. When a power-hungry sorceress named Zeta uses a potion to steal it, Leah and Zac are transported to Zahramay Falls along with Shimmer and Shine and their pets Tala and Nahal, causing Zac to learn the truth about Leah's secret genies. Together with her pet dragon Nazboo, Zeta steals the gem and flees on her flying motorcycle, forcing Shimmer and Shine to chase after her to get it back. After managing to recover the gem with the assistance of Zac and Leah, Princess Samira rewards pair by granting each of them a single wish. Leah and Zac both wish to be able to visit Shimmer and Shine in Zahramay Falls anytime they want. Princess Samira grants their wish alongside Shimmer and Shine, giving them magical genie disguises to wear whenever they visit Zahramay Falls.: Genie Gems: This episode introduces Genie Gems which are magical gems that Genies and Sorceresses like Zeta can be used to perform various types of magic. Each gem has its own power. In order to use a gem, it must be placed in a scepter and may require certain magic words or other requirements to use its power. Princess Samira rewards the twins with the Green Burst Gem which can bloom magic plants. It is stolen by Zeta after she uses a potion that ends up pulling Leah and Zac into Zahramay Falls with the twins and the gem. However, Leah tricks Zeta and manages to recover the gem.; Note: This episode was aired as a 30-minute special.
22a	2a	"All Bottled Up"	Matt Engstrom	Scott Gray	Scott O'Brien and Cynthia Petrovic	June 15, 2016	June 18, 2016	899 (202)	1.76
When Zeta traps the genies inside a bottle, Leah, Tala, and Nahal must rescue them without the use of wish magic.
22b	2b	"Zoom Zahramay"	Carin-Anne Anderson	Dustin Ferrer	Carin-Anne Anderson and Daniel Schier	June 15, 2016	June 18, 2016	899 (202)	1.76
The genies and Leah must defeat a disguised Zeta during a magic carpet race.: Genie Gem: The Racing Gem which is awarded by Princess Samira to the winner of the Magic Carpet Race. Won by the girls after managing to beat Zeta. The Racing Gem causes Magic Carpets to fly really fast.
23a	3a	"A Tree-mendous Rescue"	Enrico Vilbar Santana	Dustin Ferrer	Ryan Stapleton	June 22, 2016	June 27, 2016	203	1.48
While playing with Zac and Leah at their palace, Shimmer and Shine are visited by Kaz, a fellow genie in training who had not yet been assigned. After being introduced to Leah and Zac, Kaz, along with Shimmer and Shine, is given the task of finding a mysterious genie gem located in a forest. Though Leah is out of wishes, she and Zac tag along with the genies. While searching for the gem, Leah and her genies end up trapped in a cave, though are later freed by Zac and Kaz. After locating the gem, they activate it causing it to transform into a genie lamp. Princess Samira appears and reveals that it is the Matching Gem, which is capable of assigning genies to their perfect person. Princess Samira reveals that the gem had assigned Kaz to be Zac's genie.: Genie Gem: Match Gem, a special Genie Gem that can match a Genie to their special person. It is used to match Kaz with Zac and transforms into Zac's Genie Lamp necklace.
23b	3b	"Flying Flour"	Carin-Anne Anderson	Scott Gray	Monica Davila	June 22, 2016	June 27, 2016	203	1.48
The genies and Leah bake flying cookies. Meanwhile, Zeta sends Nazboo to steal the Flying Flour that they are using to bake the flying cookies.
24a	4a	"Mermaid Mayhem"	Dave Knott	Brian Swenlin	Simon Thelning	June 29, 2016	July 2, 2016	204	1.50
Leah and her genies go searching for mermaids after Leah learns from her genies that there are actual mermaids in Zahramay Falls. After meeting a mermaid named Nila, Leah makes a wish that turns herself and her genies into mermaids. After playing underwater with their new mermaid friend Nila, Leah and her genies realize that Leah has used up all her wishes, which prevents them from returning to their non-mermaid selves. Fortunately, Nila tells them that the Mermaid Gem can restore them to normal and allow them to transform into mermaids whenever they want, however she tells them they must first get past the gem's guardian who is rumored to be a sea monster.: Genie Gem: The Mermaid Gem which can turn genies and humans into Mermaids or restore them back to their non-Mermaid selves. Originally protected by a sea monster guardian who kept it so people would visit her, though after befriending Nila and the girls, she gives the gem to the girls allowing them to turn into mermaids whenever they want and undo the wish that turned them into mermaids waters of Zahramay Falls. This episode introduces Mermaid Nila.
24b	4b	"Snow Place We'd Rather Be"	Enrico Vilbar Santana	Dustin Ferrer	Cynthia Petrovic	June 29, 2016	July 3, 2016	204	1.50
Princess Samira asks the genies and Leah to find a snowflake gem in the ice palace.: Genie Gem: Snowflake Gem, which can create snow. Found by the girls in the Ice Palace, though was briefly stolen by Nazboo and Zeta, though Zeta used the wrong spell and ended up being covered in snow.
25a	5a	"Starry Night Sleepover"	David Knott	Dustin Ferrer	Richard Gaines	July 6, 2016	July 16, 2016	205	1.45
Leah has her first sleepover at Shimmer and Shine's palace. During the sleepover, Leah catches a shooting star that can grant wishes to anyone, even Genies. Zeta crashes the sleepover with Nazboo in order to steal the shooting star wish from Shimmer and Shine.
25b	5b	"Wild Carpet Chase"	Carin-Anne Anderson	Dustin Ferrer	Angelica Russell	July 6, 2016	July 17, 2016	205	1.45
Kaz and Zac show off a new flying carpet that Zac wished up to Leah and her genies. After it flies off, they must recover the flying carpet from Zeta.
26a	6a	"Lost and Found"	Enrico Vilbar Santana	Stephanie Simpson and Noelle Wright	Monica Davila, Ryan Stapleton and Enrico Vilbar Santana	July 13, 2016	July 18, 2016	206	1.65
Zeta places a spell on Shimmer's vanity mirror to steal her jewelry in order to find Genie gems, but the spell ends up transporting Shimmer's pet monkey Tala along with the jewelry.
26b	6b	"Freeze-amay Falls"	David Knott	Jim Nolan	Simon Thelning	July 13, 2016	July 19, 2016	206	1.65
While enjoying a day at the beach in Zahramay Falls with Leah, Shimmer and Shine find a genie bottle in the sand. After accidentally breaking the bottle, they meet an ice genie named Layla, who possesses a special ice gem necklace that grants her freezing powers. Leah and her genies decide to help Layla find a new home, but first have to deal with Zeta after she steals Layla's necklace.: Genie Gem: Layla's Ice Gem necklace which grants freezing powers, though it has a side effect of keeping its wearer cold which allows Ice Genies like Layla to stay cold regardless of the weather. It is stolen by Zeta but is later returned to Layla by Nazboo when it ends up freezing Zeta solid.
27a	7a	"Bling, Bling"	Enrico Vilbar Santana	Kevin Hopps	Cynthia Petrovic	August 3, 2016	September 7, 2016	207	0.83
Princess Samira asks Leah and her genies to take her special necklace to the Genie Jeweler to be polished. When Zeta steals Samira's necklace, the gang must retrieve it before Zeta figures out its special power.
27b	7b	"Staffinated"	Carin-Anne Anderson	Greg Weisman	Monica Davila	August 10, 2016	September 7, 2016	207	0.83
Zeta steals Princess Samira's magic staff and uses it to turn a tree into giant chicken which she uses to cause trouble in Zahramay Falls.
28a	8a	"Dragon Pox"	Carin-Anne Anderson	Elizabeth Jordan	Angelica Russell	August 22, 2016	April 7, 2017	208	1.08
Leah and her genies encounter Zeta's dragon Nazboo while shopping for Nahal and Tala at a local pet shop when she suddenly becomes ill and informs Zeta that she has Dragon Pox by Shine. Despite normally being enemies with Zeta, Leah and the genies want to help cure Nazboo. Leah suggests using "wish magic" but Zeta and the genies reveal that using wishing magic on a dragon like Nazboo is dangerous, as it usually backfires. It is revealed that the only known cure for Dragon Pox is Dragon Peppers, which Leah and her genies offer to retrieve while Zeta takes care the sick Nazboo.
28b	8b	"Lightning in a Bottle"	Don Knott	Francisco Paredes	Richard Gaines	August 22, 2016	April 7, 2017	208	1.08
Leah and her genies meet a Lightning Genie in training named Shaya while he is chasing after a runaway magic lightning bolt he created and end up teaching him a lesson in teamwork.
29a	9a	"Size of the Beholder"	Carin-Anne Anderson	Greg Weisman	Monica Davila	September 6, 2016	August 4, 2016	210	1.25
Zeta uses a genie gem to shrink Zahramay Falls Marketplace, which she places under a Crystal Dome that is immune to wishing magic. When Shine and Leah get trapped under the dome, it is up to Shimmer and Tala to get the gem from Zeta in order to restore Zahramay Falls to its proper size, without the use of wishing magic.: Genie Gem: The Size Gem which allows the user to shrink people and objects. Unlike other gems, this one is originally owned by Zeta who uses it to shrink Zahramay Falls marketplace. Shimmer later takes it from Zeta to restore her sister, Leah, and the marketplace to normal. She also uses it to shrink Zeta and planned to turn her back, but Nazboo had already taken her back to their lair. It is implied that Zeta managed to restore herself to her original size using a potion as she states she would get back to working on it after allowing Nazboo to read her one more story.
29b	9b	"Zoomicorn Toss"	Enrico Vilbar Santana	Kevin Hopps	Cynthia Petrovic and Stark Howell	September 6, 2016	April 6, 2017	210	1.37
The genies, Leah, Zac, their genies, Shaya and Zeta compete in the Zoomicorn Toss Tournament, where the use of magic is not allowed. However Zeta is determined to win the tournament trophy even if it means breaking the rules.
30a	10a	"Double Trouble"	Enrico Vilbar Santana	Kevin Hopps	Roy Meurin	September 8, 2016	September 11, 2016	209	0.82
Leah and the genies discover a genie gem that can duplicate people and are forced to contend with an entire army of Zetas when the sorceress manages to steal it.: Genie Gem: The Doubling Gem, which is found in Double Land in the possession of the Doubling Genies. It allows the user to create a double of anything, including genies, sorceresses, and humans. The duplicates are identical in appearance and personality. The gem has the power to turn a doubled individual back into a single individual. Doubles can use the gem to create more doubles. Briefly used by the Doubling Genies to duplicate Leah to demonstrate its power to the girls. Stolen by Zeta who duplicated herself, however as they both shared the same selfish personality, the two Zetas began competing with each other, giving Leah the idea to trick the two Zetas into making more Zetas, who began to argue with each other over who was more powerful, causing Nazboo to take the gem back to the girls so they could turn Zeta back into a single individual.
30b	10b	"Zany Ziffilon"	David Knott	Greg Weisman	Simon Thelning	September 8, 2016	September 12, 2016	209	0.82
While hanging out with Leah and her genies, Zac asks Kaz if she wanted to have a pet like Shimmer and Shine do, she reveals her dream pet would be a griffin-like creature called a Ziffilon, causing Zac to wish for a pet Ziffilon for Kaz.
31a	11a	"Volcano Drain-o"	David Knott	Dustin Ferrer	Simon Thelning	October 11, 2016	April 10, 2017	211	0.86
When Zeta and Nazboo suck all the glitter out of the glitter volcano, Mount Navine in order for Zeta to use the glitter to make her potions more powerful, Leah and her genies must stop her.
31b	11b	"Cleanie Genies"	Carin-Anne Anderson	Gabe Pulliam	Angelica Russell	October 11, 2016	April 10, 2017	211	0.86
In order to clean up her lair, Zeta steals Shimmer's Pristine Gem, enchanting cleaning supplies.: Genie Gem: Shimmer's Pristine Gem which can enchant cleaning supplies to clean up on their own. However one must use a specific spell to remove the enchantment or they will continue cleaning indefinitely, as Zeta discovered when she stole it to clean up her lair. Later recovered by the girls who used it to remove the enchantment.
32a	12a	"Now You See Her"	Enrico Vilbar Santana	Greg Weisman	Roy Meurin	October 13, 2016	April 11, 2017	212	0.83
As part of her latest scheme, Zeta and Nazboo go in search of an Earth fox in order to create a camouflage potion that will allow her and Nazboo to sneak into Shimmer and Shine's palace, allowing Zeta to steal their Genie Gems. However, Leah and her genies just happen to picnic in the area where Zeta and Nazboo are searching. While Shimmer and Shine are busy with their pets, Leah wonders off by herself and encounters a cute little fox, the very thing Zeta is looking for, and names it "Parisa". While Leah is playing hide-and-seek with Parisa, Zeta and Nazboo find the fox which is revealed to be the fox they have been searching for. With a dab from Parisa's paw, Zeta completes her potion which she uses to turn herself and Nazboo invisible. Zeta and Nazboo then steal Shine and Shimmer’s carpet and fly to the genies' palace, unaware that Parisa was following them using his natural camouflage ability. Noticing their carpet seemingly flying away on its own, Leah and her genies give chase following it back to the palace. After reuniting with Parisa and discovering the invisible Nazboo, the fox works with Leah and her genies in foiling Zeta's plan. Having bonded with Leah, Parisa refuses to return to the wild and as a result, Leah gains a magical pet of her own.
32b	12b	"Untamed Talent"	David Knott	Dustin Ferrer	Richard Gaines	October 13, 2016	April 11, 2017	212	0.83
Leah, her genies, and Zeta enter their respective pets into the Zahramay Falls Pet Talent Show. When Leah's pet Parisa manages to impress with his talent for painting, Zeta decides to cheat using her magic to ensure Nazboo wins the competition, so she can have her wish for a genie gem that will make her all-powerful.: Fake Genie Gem: A Squeaky Toy Gem wished up by Nazboo. It is unclear if it is magical as it is implied to be just a squeaky toy, though it may be a Genie Gem that is magically a Squeaky Toy. Ends up foiling Zeta's plan to have Nazboo wish for a powerful genie gem. Nazboo plays with it along with Parisa, Tala, and Nahal after Zeta discovers it is not all-powerful gem she had wanted Nazboo to wish for.
33a	13a	"The Crystal Queen"	Carin-Anne Anderson	Francisco Paredes	Monica Davila and Ryan Stapleton	November 18, 2016	April 12, 2017	213	0.99
Zeta captures Samira and seals her inside Caliana Caves which contain crystals that are invulnerable to wishing magic. Leah and her genies are forced to seek help from Samira's mentor, Empress Caliana to free Samira who is trapped in a crystal atop the head of the cave's crystalline Guardian, Rohan who has fallen under the effects of Zeta's magic. Caliana and the girls must find a way to free Rohan from Zeta's spell to save Samira. Meanwhile, an angry Roya confronts Zeta and Nazboo when they try to take over Samira's place. Guest voice: Barbara Eden as Empress Caliana.
33b	13b	"The Glob"	Enrico Vilbar Santana	Kevin Hopps	Stark Howell and Cynthia Petrovic	November 18, 2016	April 12, 2017	213	0.99
The girls accidentally create a friendly, sticky glob of Gooey Gummy Genie Jelly candy who is curious about everything. Suddenly, when a storm called a Glitternado hits Zahramay Falls, he helps Leah and her genies rescue some genies that had gotten pulled into the storm. Guest voice: Richard Steven Horvitz as Gobi
34a	14a	"Frosty Fun"	Carin-Anne Anderson	Greg Weisman	Monica Davila	December 16, 2016	April 15, 2017	216	1.27
Little ice sprites follow Leah and her genies back to Shimmer and Shine's palace where they end up causing trouble with the freezing magic while competing with one another in various winter games, forcing Leah to use her wishes to undo their magic. Eventually, they end up creating a large snowball while playing Snow Pins and Snowballs, which they end up getting trapped as it rolls, forcing Leah and her genies to work together to save them after they fall off the cloud that Shimmer and Shine's palace floats on. Afterward they apologize for the trouble they cause and end up befriending Leah and her genies.
34b	14b	"Zeta in Training"	Enrico Vilbar Santana	Kevin Hopps	Roy Meurin	December 16, 2016	April 15, 2017	216	1.27
Zeta was originally a genie in training and the only one to fail the training due to Zeta's selfishness and her decision to become an all-powerful sorceress instead. However, Princess Samira gives Zeta a Second Chance in honor of Second Chance Day, which Zeta agrees to in the hopes that it will make her more powerful. However, Samira prevents Zeta from granting her own wishes and assigns her to be Shimmer and Shine's genie. Zeta decides she will fine a way to trick Shimmer and Shine into making a wish for her, though her plan ends up backfiring due to the way Zeta phrased the wish and the gem she summons is removed by one of Leah's wishes. Afterwards, Zeta tells Samira she quits again as selflessly granting wishes is too hard for her.: Genie Gem: An unknown Giant Green Gem wished up by the twins after being tricked by Zeta into making it. However, it was too big and ended up rolling around forcing Zeta to flee from it. Is implied to be powerful due to its size, though its magic capabilities are not shown before it is wished away by Leah.
35a	15a	"Pet Bedrooms"	David Knott	Scott Gray	Richard Gaines	January 13, 2017	April 13, 2017	214	1.05
Leah and baby-sits Tala and Nahal with Parisa while Shimmer and Shine build their pets their own bedrooms.
35b	15b	"Boom Zahra-Mom"	Carin-Anne Anderson	Dustin Ferrer	Angelica Russell	January 13, 2017	April 13, 2017	214	1.05
A baby bird mistakes Zeta for his mom, the girls must help her return him to his nest.
36a	16a	"Masquerade Charade"	David Knott	Sarah Jenkins	Simon Thelning	January 27, 2017	April 14, 2017	215	1.03
The girls attend a masquerade party at Princess Samira's palace. Zeta crashes the party and uses Samira's mask to pretend to be Samira. Meanwhile Shimmer hopes her mask will win best mask at the party.
36b	16b	"The Silent Treatment"	Enrico Vilbar Santana	Dustin Ferrer	Stark Howell	January 27, 2017	April 14, 2017	215	1.03
Zeta uses a potion to swap Leah's voice with a bird's voice and her genies need to find a cure to restore her voice. Zeta is forced to join forces with them, when she is turned tiny after falling into a stall full of potion ingredients.
37a	17a	"Potion Control"	David Knott	Kevin Hopps	Richard Gaines	February 17, 2017	April 16, 2017	217	1.01
When the girls accidentally mix with the wrong potion, it causes Nazboo to float up in the air and need to help Zeta reverse the potion. Zeta finds herself having to work with the girls and is shocked when she finds herself being nice to them.
37b	17b	"Feel Better"	Carin-Anne Anderson	Jerome Halligan and Greg Weisman	Angelica Russell	February 17, 2017	April 16, 2017	217	1.01
When a sneezing bug buzzes through Zahramay Falls, it causes all genies in Zahramay Falls to create out of control magic every time they sneeze. The girls must work together to help the bug find a Zahramay Bluebell flower to cure everyone and undo the magic caused by their sneezes. Fortunately, Leah is unaffected by the Sneeze Bug's dust due to being human.
38	18	"The Pirate Genie"	David Knott and Carin-Anne Anderson	Dustin Ferrer and Kevin Hopps	Simon Thelning and Monica Davila	March 3, 2017	April 19, 2017	220	0.89
The girls are in for some fun and adventure when a pirate genie named Zora accidentally lands on their doorstep. Guest voice: Kellie Pickler as Zora: Note: This episode aired as a 30-minute special.
39a	19a	"Trick or Treasure"	Enrico Vilbar Santana	Francisco Paredes	Roy Meurin	March 17, 2017	TBA	218	1.18
Leah and her genies visit Nila for an underwater treasure hunt only to encounter a shapeshifting creature named Gazi who wants the treasure for himself who is also being chased by a Zahramay Shark.: Genie Gem: The Mermaid Gem obtained in "Mermaid Mayhem" returns and is used by the girls to turn into Mermaids.
39b	19b	"Easy As Pie"	Enrico Vilbar Santana	Rich Fogel	Stark Howell	March 17, 2017	TBA	218	1.18
The boys and girls decide to make pies and give them out in the marketplace, though Zac's pies are not very good so the genies suggest they make a pie using Zazzle Berries. Meanwhile, Zeta wants to make a Sweet Potion that will make everyone think she is nice and adore her, though needs Zazzle Berries to make it, only to discover that the all but one of the Zazzle Berries has been picked. Spying Zac nearby Zeta uses a Sweet potion on Zac that makes him think Zeta is nice and causes him to follow her every command. Zeta convinces Zac to give her his Zazzle Berries and the others collected by Kaz and the girls. Eventually the potion wears off and Zac wishes to stop Zeta, though Kaz overdoes it causing time for everything to freeze except for Kaz and Zac, though they decide to take advantage of it to collect all the Zazzle Berries that fell while Zeta was trying to escape, before unfreezing everyone. Zac and Kaz then offer Zazzle Berry Pies they made to everyone. Meanwhile, Zeta complains now no one will think she is sweet due to being unable to make more Sweet Potion, while Nazboo begins licking some of the pie that Zac had made earlier off Zeta who had crashed into some after time was unfrozen.
40a	20a	"Bungle in the Jungle"	Carin-Anne Anderson	Rich Fogel	Angelica Russell	March 31, 2017	April 18, 2017	219	1.09
The girls and their pets need to escape a temple after being trapped in by Zeta who plans to trap them their so she can steal their genie gems from their palace. Fortunately Zeta and Nazboo end up getting trapped inside a cage within the temple before they can leave. The girls and their respective pets ends up getting separated in different rooms. By working together with their pets, the girls must find a way to escape the rooms. Leah and Parisa find themselves trapped with an aggressive plant, while Shimmer and Tala must contend with an angry monkey idol after Tala takes its banana. Shine and Nahal encounter a big tiger that lives inside the temple, who they become friends after Shine removes a thorn from her paw.
40b	20b	"The Mysterious Tower"	David Knott	Greg Weisman	Ron Brewer	March 31, 2017	April 18, 2017	219	1.09
Zac, Kaz and the girls visit a tower and find a pendant, whose wearer can turn them into a half-Ziffilon monster. Kaz must overcome her fear to figure out why Zac keeps disappearing every time the monster appears, only to discover that the pendant is causing Zac to transform every time Zain cries in fear.

=== Season 3 (2017–18) ===
No. overall	No. in season	Title	Directed by	Written by	Storyboard by	U.S. air date	Canadian air date	Prod. code	U.S. viewers (millions)
41a	1a	"Underground Bound"	Enrico Vilbar Santana	Dustin Ferrer	Roy Meurin	May 5, 2017	January 6, 2018	301	1.10
As the girls search for Leah's lost necklace, it is found by a Grunt named Cog who begins making wishes with it. Guest voice: Tom Kenny as Cog
41b	1b	"Wishy Washy Genie"	David Knott	Melinda LaRose and Francisco Paredes	Simon Thelning	May 5, 2017	January 6, 2018	301	1.10
Zac accidentally makes a wish to stay in Zahramay Falls forever. At first Zac is unconcerned by the ramifications of never being able to leave Zahramay Falls, that is until it is revealed that things like mustard do not exist in Zahramay Falls causing Zac to become desperate to remove the wish. Kaz suggests they seek out the Wishy Washy Genie who only Kaz believes to be real as Shimmer and Shine consider him to just be a legend. However with little options the boys and the girls decide to search for the Wishy Washy Genie, who Kaz idolizes, to reverse the wish, however they find that despite his power and reputation, the Wishy Washy Genie really is wishy-washy as he has trouble making decisions. The girls, Zac, and Kaz must help the Wishy Washy Genie overcome his indecisiveness in order to obtain the Wishy Washy Genie's staff to undo Zac's wish.
42a	2a	"Carpet Trouble"	Enrico Vilbar Santana	Francisco Paredes	Lee-Roy Lahey	May 19, 2017	January 13, 2018	303	0.98
The girls visit the carpet vendor and designer Dalia to fix their carpet. Shimmer is shown to idolize Dalia and has an interest in magic carpet making and design. Dalia encourages Shimmer to try her hand at carpet making which Shimmer finds difficult at first. Meanwhile Zeta and Nazboo plan to take some of Dalia's magic thread so she can make a magic sorceress robe to make her more powerful. However when Zeta and Nazboo try to steal a ball of thread it backfires and Zeta ends up running from the ball as Nazboo stands on top of it, causing the girls chase after her on their carpet which Dalia had not finished fixing causing it to not fly properly, forcing Shimmer to fix it herself so they can save Zeta and Nazboo.
42b	2b	"Dragon Tales"	Carin-Anne Anderson	Dustin Ferrer	Stark Howell	May 19, 2017	January 13, 2018	303	0.98
Leah and her genies find Zeta looking for Nazboo in the marketplace and she ends up telling them the story of how Nazboo became her pet, though Leah and the genies find Zeta's uncharacteristic portrayal of herself in the story hard to believe. Leah helps Zeta find Nazboo with a wish which summons a microphone which Leah uses to call Nazboo by offering free belly rubs, causing Nazboo to come to her and reveals he ran off because he was hungry. When the genies mention the mean Dragons that supposedly bullied him in Zeta's story, Nazboo refutes it and tells them the true story of how he became Zeta's pet.
43	3	"Rainbow Zahramay"	David Knott and Carin-Anne Anderson	Greg Weisman	Ron Brewer and Stark Howell	August 29, 2017 (Note: This episode was released early on iTunes on June 5, 2017.)	February 11, 2018	306	0.78
When the rainbow waterfall loses its purple color causing a purple mist to appear in Zahramay Falls that removes magic from flying carpets and causes Genies to lose their ability to fly and grant wishes, Samira sends the girls into Rainbow Zahramay, where everything is coming up rainbows (hence the name). There, the trio find a new friend, a Waterfall Genie named Imma and must help her find her staff to restore the purple water to stop magic mist that is causing havoc in Zahramay Falls. Meanwhile Kaz and Zac are tasked by Samira with preventing a panic in Zahramay Falls, while Imma and the girls are dealing with the problem which is made worse by Imma's playful pet Ziffilon cubs, Lili and Sai who have been playing with Imma's staff, causing more mist that produces random magic based on its color. The girls and Imma must find a way to stop Lili and Sai from using Imma's staff to close all the color water gates and restore the missing colors to the Rainbow Waterfall without wish magic, while Kaz, Zac, and Samira deal with the out-of-control magic mist in Zahramay Falls.: Genie Gem: Princess Samira gives the girls a magical ship powered by Genie Gems which they use to explore Rainbow Zahramay.
44a	4a	"Hairdos and Don'ts"	David Knott	Rich Fogel	April Amezquita	August 31, 2017	January 21, 2018	307	0.79
Leah and her genies meet the genie hair stylist Ayla while exploring the Azar Bazaar in Rainbow Zahramay, who has a magic comb with the power to change anyone's hairstyle including her own. However Zeta and Nazboo learn about the magic comb during their shopping trip to the Azar Bazaar for potions and Zeta decides to steal its power for herself and uses its power to escape when her theft is discovered. Ayla, Leah, and her genies must use Ayla's hair color changing gems to beat Zeta at her own game to get the comb back to save Ayla's hair salon from going out of business as she needs the comb to change her customer's hair.: Genie Gems: Ayla gives the Color Gems which can change one's hair color. Later used by Ayla and the girls to disguise themselves to trick Zeta so they could get Ayla's magic comb back.
44b	4b	"Flower Power"	Enrico Vilbar Santana	Francisco Paredes	Roy Meurin	August 31, 2017	January 21, 2018	307	0.79
Leah and her genies travel to a magic garden in Rainbow Zahramay to see the Lumos Tree, where they meet a Flitter Genie named Minu and shrink down to her size to explore. However when Minu drops a gem that causes the Lumos Tree to glow when the moonlight shines on it, Leah and her genies must help her get it back from a female Squirrel who collects sparkly objects.: Genie Gem: The Lumos Tree's gem which causes the tree to glow when moonlight is shined on it. Dropped by Minu and found by Miss Squirrel. Miss Squirrel returns it after the girls make her home sparkly and helps the girls and Minu return it back to the Lumos Tree.
45a	5a	"Samira and Zeta"	Enrico Vilbar Santana	Francisco Paredes	Roy Meurin	September 15, 2017	January 14, 2018	304	0.82
Samira tells the girls the story of how she and Zeta first met, and how they were once best friends when they were both genies-in-training at Empress Caliana's school, Genie Hall. Guest voice: Barbara Eden as Empress Caliana.
45b	5b	"The Zeta Touch"	David Knott	Jim Nolan	Steve Moore	September 15, 2017	January 14, 2018	304	0.82
The girls must stop Zeta when she takes the Genie Jeweler's Jewel Gem scepter that Zeta believes will give her the power to grow genie gems from magical vines.: Genie Gem: The Jewel Gem which has the power to grow jewels from magical vines that grow from anything the gem touches. However the jewels it grows are not Genie Gems. It is owned by the Genie Jeweler though is stolen by Zeta, though recovered by Leah and her genies.
46a	6a	"Genie for a Day"	Carin-Anne Anderson	Greg Weisman	Kate Brusk	October 6, 2017	January 7, 2018	302	0.92
The girls visit the marketplace to shop for blue roses though find that they are sold out (after Zeta purchased them all as ingredients for a potion). Leah wishes for some blue roses and Shimmer summons a large amount of them. Shimmer admits how much she enjoys granting wishes which causes Leah to wish to be a genie for a day so she can grant wishes to make others happy. As a result, Leah temporarily gains the ability to fly and grant wishes. However she asks Shimmer and Shine to let her do things on her own. They give her a genie bottle which Zeta uses a potion to obtain. As a result, Leah finds herself forced to grant Zeta's three wishes, though she tells Parisa she will have to be careful how she grants Zeta's wishes to prevent Zeta from using them to take over Zahramay Falls. Leah manages to foil Zeta's attempts to make herself the strongest sorceress by interpreting it literally, making Zeta muscular and strong instead of a magically strong sorceress with magic stronger than wish magic. Zeta assumes that Leah just has trouble granting wishes. Leah pretends to try and help Zeta make a successful wish, which leads to Zeta wishing to be top Sorceress in Zahramay Falls, which Leah once again interprets literally by transporting Leah to the top of a mountain. Zeta becomes frustrated by Leah's inability to grant wishes incorrectly and after triggering an avalanche with her enhanced strength ends up back in the marketplace where Leah reminds her of her last wish, though Zeta sarcastically says she might as well wish for a Dragon Cookie for Nazboo which Leah grants correctly, revealing to Zeta that she only wished to become a genie to make others happy and Zeta's final wish made Nazboo happy. After granting Zeta's final wish, Leah reverts to a normal human losing her ability to grant wishes and fly. However Leah decides to use her last wish to restore Zeta to normal causing her to loss her muscles and enhanced strength. Zeta is touched by Leah's kindness and as a show of thanks she orders a batch of Dragon Cookies which she shares with the girls and Nazboo.
46b	6b	"Zac the Clueless Detective"	David Knott	Dustin Ferrer	Ron Brewer	October 6, 2017	January 7, 2018	302	0.92
When Zac thinks the girls are missing, he plays detective and goes on a search with Kaz. However when Zac attempts to lure out a hot dog burglar he believes the girls are searching for, he ends up attracting a bear who wants the hot dogs that Zac and Kaz are using as bait for the burglar. Fortunately, the girls manage to save them from the hungry bear.
47a	7a	"Abraca-Nope"	David Knott	Francisco Paredes	Ron Brewer	October 13, 2017	December 3, 2017	310	0.88
While on a trip to the Azar Bazaar to see the Azar Gem, the girls encounter a mysterious parrot-like bird they name Bali. However soon after their genie gem powered ship stops working along with Shimmer and Shine's genie magic which includes levitation and wish magic. Eventually they figure out that Bali is the cause and Shine explains that Bali must be a Nil, a creature that causes all magic near it to stop working, though it does so unintentionally and only wishes to play. After getting their ship working again, they leave Bali and continue on their journey to the Azar Bazaar, however Bali follows them causing trouble with its magic nullification ability which effects any genies it encounters in Azar Bazaar. The girls try to lead it out of the Bazaar, however are forced to follow Bali around when she wants to play tag. Meanwhile Zeta creates a laughing potion which she plans to use on the genies so she can incapacitate them allowing her to steal the Azar Gem, which is on display levitating over a fountain in Azar Bazaar. The Azar Gem too is effected by Bali, as it stops levitating when Bali perches on it. Zeta's potion prevents the girls from stopping Zeta from stealing the Azar Gem, though Bali ends up freeing them as its ability nullifies the magic of Zeta's potion. The girls decide to use Bali's magic nullification ability to stop Zeta from getting away with the Azar Gem.: Genie Gem: The Azar Gem is a large Genie Gem that can levitate and is normally found atop its fountain in the Azar Bazaar a popular tourist spot. Thinking it was powerful Zeta uses a Tickle Potion to incapacitate the other genies. However its magic is nullified if a Nil like Bali sits on it, causing it to stop levitating. Zeta believes the gem to be powerful, though none other abilities beyond levitating itself are shown.
47b	7b	"Treehouse Retreat"	David Knott	Andrew Blanchette	Steve Moore	October 13, 2017	December 3, 2017	310	0.88
The girls visit Rainbow Zahramay to have a sleepover at a treehouse retreat. However Zeta and Nazboo decide to take a relaxing vacation in a treehouse next door to the one the girls are staying at. Zeta tries to scare the girls away as their slumber party is interrupting her relaxing vacation.
48a	8a	"Nazboo's Family Reunion"	Carin-Anne Anderson	Andrew Blanchette	Kate Brusk	October 20, 2017	January 20, 2018	305	0.81
When Nazboo's siblings come to visit, Zeta recruits them to help take the girls' gems when they are not home.
48b	8b	"The Darpoppy"	Enrico Vilbar Santana	Rich Fogel	Lee-Roy Lahey	October 20, 2017	January 20, 2018	305	0.81
Zac and Kaz join the girls in exploring a jungle in Rainbow Zahramay. When Zac wishes himself into the jungle to find a mythical creature known as a Darpoppy, Kaz and the girls go on an adventure to find him, during which the girls help him overcome his fear to find Zac.
49a	9a	"Hounded"	Enrico Vilbar Santana	Samuel Bernstein	April Amezquita	October 27, 2017	January 27, 2018	309	1.04
While on a picnic with the girls, Kaz, and their pets, Zac misses his dog Rocket and wishes that Rocket was in Zahramay Falls. As a result Rocket is summoned to Zahramay Falls where he reunites with Zac, the girls, Tala, and Nahal. However Parisa, Kaz, and Zain are frightened by Rocket as they have never encountered a dog before due to them being native to Leah and Zac's world and not Zahramay Falls. While Leah manages to calm Parisa, Rocket ends up scaring Kaz and Zain who flee when the dog playfully chases them to the marketplace. Meanwhile, Princess Samira takes her staff to the Genie Jeweler to have it polished, while Zeta hides with Nazboo nearby planning to steal it again. As Rocket chases Kaz and Zain into the marketplace he scares the other genies who like Kaz are unfamiliar with dogs and mistake Rocket for a monster. Zeta and Nazboo also mistake Rocket for a monster though are not frightened by him and Zeta decides to use him to scare the Genie Jeweler to steal Samira's staff. Meanwhile girls and Zac follow Rocket, Kaz, and Zain to the marketplace where they find Kaz and Zain hiding. They remind Kaz of how people where scared of Zain at first, convincing him and Zain to give Rocket a chance. Zac decides to think like a dog by acting like one which he is very good at due to having learned from Rocket. Meanwhile Zeta manages to use a Lasso Potion to tie a rope onto Rocket which she uses as a leash, though Rocket ends up pulling her and Nazboo around the marketplace, though she manages to get him under control and uses a banana to lead him into scaring the Genie Jeweler, allowing her to steal the staff. However, Zac, Kaz, the girls, and their pets manage to arrive and Zac uses a toy dog bone to make Rocket run around, wrapping Zeta up in the leash lasso tied to Rocket who retrieves Samira's staff. Samira arrives and knowing Rocket is Zac's pet dog thanks to having observed Shimmer and Shine's adventures in Leah and Zac's world, thanks them for retrieve her staff by permitting Rocket to accompany Zac to Zahramay Falls whenever he wants, though a frustrated Zeta hopes that it will not be all the time.
49b	9b	"The Sorceress' Apprentice"	Carin-Anne Anderson	Greg Weisman	Stark Howell	October 27, 2017	January 27, 2018	309	1.04
After learning that Zac managed to create a really difficult potion while helping Kaz and the girls, Zeta decides to use magic to make Zac forget his identity, so she can convince him into believing that he is her apprentice in the hopes he can help her create potions that will make Zeta all powerful. However unbeknownst to Zeta, Nazboo failed to get the right kind of flower to create her Forget-Me Potion to remove Zac's memory and it is later revealed that Zac had not lost his memory and accompanied Zeta of his own free will as he thought it would be fun. After Zeta is rescued from an out of control Storm Potion, Zeta is touched when Zac reveals he played along as he considered Zeta a friend.
50a	10a	"All That Glitters"	Carin-Anne Anderson	Robert Lamoreaux & Michelle Lamoreaux	Kate Brusk	November 3, 2017	January 28, 2018	312	0.87
While playing I Spy on their boat in Rainbow Zahramay, the girls spot something shining on a nearby cloud and decide to investigate. They find a glittery palace where they meet the Glitter Genie Afina and her Zoomicorn friend Gleam. She shows them her Glitter Gem ring which allows its wearer to use Glitter Magic to create glittery objects and magic weather such as a Glitternado. However Zeta and Nazboo also find the palace while searching Rainbow Zahramay for things that could make Zeta more powerful. Zeta decides to steal the ring for its magic using a potion. Afina reveals that they must get the ring back from Zeta before her palace fades away. After Leah breaks Zeta's flying scooter with a wish, Zeta uses the ring's magic to escape with Nazboo and create her own glitter palace. She creates a Glitternado when Afina and the girls enter her palace after Nazboo lets them in. However Afina whistles to call her friend Gleam who uses its wings to counter the Glitternado and dispel it, causing Zeta to lose the ring. However Afina shows she bares no hard feelings towards Zeta by using her ring to help Zeta and Nazboo return home.: Genie Gem: Afina's Glitter Gem which she wears on a ring. Has the power of Glitter allowing it to perform glitter based magic. Anything created by the person wielding it will fade away if the ring is not in the user's possession. Briefly stolen by Zeta, though later retrieved by Afina and the girls with help from Gleam. All the things created by Zeta using the ring faded away after Afina reclaimed the ring.
50b	10b	"Grab That Gem!"	Carin-Anne Anderson	Francisco Paredes	Stark Howell	November 3, 2017	January 28, 2018	312	0.87
While in Rainbow Zahramay the girls find a Kaliope Crystal which are crystals used to create Genie Gems. The twins suggest to Leah that they take it to Princess Ula, the Ruler of Rainbow Zahramay who is responsible for making Genie Gems. They travel to Ula's Palace. They encounter a mermaid who they discover is actually Ula in the form of a Mermaid. After showing her the Kalliope Crystal, Ula shows them her workshop where she makes Genie Gems. She demonstrates how a Kaliope Crystal is turned into a Genie Gem, by using one over her Kaliope Crystals breaking it apart to create a blank gem and then imbue it with the power of Music to create a Music Gem. She then offers to let the girls create their own gem using the crystal they found. Leah wants to create a Flight Gem, while Shine wants to create a Speedy Gem, and Shimmer wants to create a gem that makes things bright and shiny. Ula however explains that they can only add on magic power to the gem. Though the girls think they are in agreement they end up imbuing different powers into the gem which results in an unstable Chaos Gem, which randomly produces the magic it is imbued with causing havoc. However Ula explains she can turn it back into a blank gem, though they need to put it on her gem pedestal to remove the magic before it becomes a Chaos Gem permanently. They chase it through the palace, but it goes into the water and the girls reveal that they could get it if they had their Genie Gem, causing Ula to show them her Divina Gem which possesses the power of all the gems Ula created including the Mermaid Gem, allowing them to transform into Mermaids to chase after it. They follow it back to Ula's workshop, where it causes Leah and objects to levitate. Eventually Shine manages to catch the Chaos Gem and Ula uses her staff to remove its magic, turning it back into a blank gem. The girls try again and decide to create a Rainbow Gem which has all the powers they wanted as it allows them to create rainbows to ride on.: Genie Gems: This episode introduces how Genie Gems are created from Kaliope Crystals which are crystals used to create Blank Gems which are then imbued with magic using Ula's staff and gem pedestal to create Genie Gems. Several different gems are introduced: Blank Gems which are gems that have not yet been imbued with magic, Music Gem which is imbued with the power of music, Chaos Gems which are unstable gems created by imbuing a gem with separate powers (such as the Chaos Gem created by the girls which had the power of Flight, Speed, and Color Changing), the Divina Gem which is a gem created by Ula that contains the power of all the gems she has created and is implied to be one of the most powerful genie gems that exists, and the Rainbow Gem created by the girls which has the power to create rainbows which the girls can ride on using rainbow boards. The Mermaid Gem is also mentioned to have been created by Ula as the Divina Gem possesses its power, allowing Ula to use it in the same manner as the Mermaid Gem and is implied to be how Ula transformed into her mermaid form that the girls first encounter her in.
51	11	"Dance Magic"	Carin-Anne Anderson and Enrico Vilbar Santana	Dustin Ferrer	Kate Brusk and Lee-Roy Lahey	November 17, 2017	February 4, 2018	308	0.88
Princess Samira and the girls travel to Rainbow Zahramay so Samira can introduce them to the Dance Magic Instructor, Sarah so they can learn some Dance Magic. However Zeta follows secretly follows them in the hopes of learning some Dance Magic moves herself. Sarah and Samira reveal that Dance Magic is so powerful that its effects cannot be undone by wish magic and only dance magic can undo its effects. Sarah also shows them her Dance Magic shoes which increase the power of her dance magic. Zeta who has trouble learning any dance moves decides to steal the shoes and flees Rainbow Zahramay freezing the Rainbow Waterfall allowing her to take over Zahramay Falls while Samira is in Rainbow Zahramay to fill the Wishing Wells with wishes. Without their wish magic the girls are forced to use the few magic dances that Sarah and Samira taught them to unfreeze the waterfall and get Sarah's shoes back from Zeta before she uses the shoes to get rid of all wish magic.: Note: This was aired as a 30 minute special and features Zeta's first musical number.
52a	12a	"Whatever Floats Your Boat"	Enrico Vilbar Santana	Rich Fogel	Lee-Roy Lahey	December 1, 2017	February 25, 2018	311	0.66
A cute little Zenguin takes a wishing coin and lead the girls on a chase around their boat.
52b	12b	"Waterbent"	David Knott	Greg Weisman	Ron Brewer	December 1, 2017	February 25, 2018	311	0.66
Imma the Waterfall Genie invites the girls to a pool party. However Zeta follows them and steals Imma's Staff in order to use its water magic to make herself the most powerful person in both Rainbow Zahramay and Zahramay Falls, forcing Imma and the girls to work together to get it back and stop Zeta.
53a	13a	"Snow Time to Spare"	Carin-Anne Anderson	Greg Weisman	Kate Brusk	January 30, 2018	February 3, 2018	314	0.86
The girls visit Layla at her Ice Palace and help her prepare for a festival.
53b	13b	"Pet Games"	David Knott	Andrew Blanchette	Steve Moore	January 30, 2018	February 3, 2018	314	0.86
The girls and Kaz invite Nazboo and his siblings to compete with their pets in the pet games. Zeta accompanies the siblings and though uninterested in the games at first she changes her mind when it is revealed that the prize is a box containing a mystery prize, which Zeta believes will make her all powerful causing her to want the Nazboo Family to win so she can claim the prize.
54a	14a	"Zahramay Dreams"	David Knott	Robert Lamoreaux & Michelle Lamoreaux	Ron Brewer	February 1, 2018	February 18, 2018	315	0.76
While sleeping over at Shimmer and Shine's palace, Leah dreams of them riding on shooting stars. After waking up she tells her genies about her dream and she hears about their dreams. However when Leah tries to wish for her dream to come true, it does not work and her genies explain that only the dream genie Nadia can grant such a wish and that she lives in a palace somewhere, so Leah wishes to travel there which summons a cloud that can take them there. Meanwhile Zeta is flying Nazboo around on her scooter to help him fall asleep though the girls fly by and wake him up to Zeta's frustration. However Zeta notices that they must going somewhere important to be out so late at night and decides to follow them. At Nadia's palace they meet Ezri, Nadia's assistant who immediately recognizes the girls and explains that he and Nadia know about everyone in Zahramay Falls before introducing them to Nadia. Nadia shows them how she creates dreams using special dust. They get to see dreams of Nahal, Tala, Zain, and Princess Samira. Leah asks if she can make her shooting star riding dream come true. Nadia reveals it is rare for her to make dreams come true but decides to do so seeing as Leah and her genies had come to visit her. Ezri is excited as he has never seen Nadia use the dream come true dust before and rushes off to fetch it for her. Zeta wants the dust to make her dream of being the most powerful person in Zahramay Falls come true, using a grabber potion to steal it. Recognizing Zeta, Ezri notes that it would be trouble if Zeta's dream comes true and joins the girls in chasing after Zeta, while Nadia remains at her palace to continue her job of creating dreams. After stopping Zeta using sleepy dust provided by Ezri and retrieving the Dream Come True Dust, Nadia uses it to make Leah's dream come true and hopes they will come visit her and Ezri again. Guest voice: Brittany Snow as Nadia.
54b	14b	"Careful What You Wish For"	Carin-Anne Anderson	Nicole Demerse	Stark Howell	February 1, 2018	February 18, 2018	315	0.76
Princess Samira invites the girls and Zac to her palace. Samira shows them her library containing magic books and gems. Zac notices a Caliana Crystal which the girls and Samira explain comes from the Caliana Caves and how it soaks up wish magic preventing wishes from being made near it. Samira then shows them the wish room which contains wish magic which Samira uses to create wish items for Leah and Zac's world. When a bunch of wish ladybugs, Samira leaves to chase after them with other genies in the room leaving Zac and the girls to explore the wish room, though she warns them not to make any wishes as the magic in the room will cause any wish to be granted over and over. The girls and Zac have fun in the room, until Zac remembers he is still hungry and accidentally wishes he had a Zazzle berry causing large Zazzle berries to start filling the room. Samira returns and attempts to stop the wish using her staff but it gets caught in one of the Zazzle berries. The girls suggest they use the Caliana Crystal to soak up the wish magic and return to the library, while Zac and Samira try to recover Samira's staff. However Shimmer opens one of the magic books which unleashes a powerful gust of wind that creates a huge mess. They manage to close the book but have to search for the crystal in the mess. They eventually find it and Leah tries to wish them back to the wish room but the crystal soaks up the wish magic forcing them to walk back. They find Samira and Zac stuck in a pile of Zazzle berries, forcing them to use the crystal to absorb the wish magic. Afterwards Zac manages to retrieve Samira's staff which she uses to clean up the remaining Zazzle berries, though she creates one to give to Zac as thanks for his help.
55a	15a	"Glitter Glitch!"	Enrico Vilbar Santana	Robert Lamoreaux & Michelle Lamoreaux	April Amezquita	March 6, 2018	March 11, 2018	313	0.89
The girls visit the Glitter Genie to learn glitter magic, but something causes Shimmer to keep messing up.
55b	15b	"Crystal Chaos"	Enrico Vilbar Santana	Francisco Paredes	Lee-Roy Lahey	March 6, 2018	March 11, 2018	313	0.89
The girls visit Princess Ula, who takes them underwater to help gather crystals in the beautiful coral reef.
56a	16a	"A Lightning Colt for Shaya"	Carin-Anne Anderson	Robert Lamoreaux & Michelle Lamoreaux	Kate Brusk	March 18, 2018	TBA	317	0.46
The girls travel with Shaya to an island where they meet the Animal Genie who looks after all animals.: Note: Starting this episode, episodes now air on the Nick Jr. channel.
56b	16b	"A Special Delivery"	Enrico Vilbar Santana	Nicole Demerse	Lee-Roy Lahey	March 18, 2018	TBA	317	0.46
Shimmer and Shine tell Leah the story of how they met Tala and Nahal with help from the Animal Genie.
57	17	"Zahra glitter, Zahra Glow"	David Knott and Carin-Anne Anderson	Robert Lamoreaux & Michelle Lamoreaux	April Amezquita and Stark Howell	March 23, 2018	TBA	318	0.63
The Girls celebrate Cuddle Buddy Day by helping the Animal Genie deliver pets. When Zeta use a spell to make everything dark, Misha teams up with Afina to make the pets glow so they can see.: Note: This was aired as a 30-minute special episode with special guest Jewel as Animal Genie.
58a	18a	"Nila Out of Water"	Enrico Vilbar Santana	Andrew Blanchette	April Amezquita	May 7, 2018	July 29, 2018	316	0.37
While spending time with their friend Nila the mermaid, the girls tell her about what it is like on land in Zahramay Falls and she wishes to see what it is like giving Leah the idea to use the Mermaid Gem to transform Nila's mermaid tail into legs allowing her to explore Zahramay Falls with the girls. Unfortunately Nila is a quite literally a "fish out of water" forcing her to get used to life out of the water though she gets discouraged when she accidentally causes trouble though the girls help her fix her mistakes and still enjoy her time in Zahramay Falls.: Genie Gems: It is revealed that the Mermaid Gem can work in reverse for mermaids turning their fish tail into legs. However like Leah and her Genies having to learn how to swim like mermaids when they first turned into them, Nila has to learn how to walk on two legs and is unfamiliar with the surface world. The Mermaid Gem can also reverse the process to turn Nila back into a mermaid.
58b	18b	"I Dream of Zeta"	David Knott	Francisco Paredes	Steve Moore	May 7, 2018	July 29, 2018	316	0.37
Nadia the Dream Genie asks the girls to accompany her apprentice Ezri on his first solo challenge as a Dream Genie to deliver wishes all over Zahramay Falls while Nadia is delivering dreams to Rainbow Zahramay. Ezri explains that he is supposed to sprinkle dream genie dust on the inhabitants of Zahramay Falls. The bags containing the correct dust glow when in the presence of the correct person. Ezri and the girls manage to successfully deliver all the dust save for two bags which Ezri reveals go to the same place, which the girls notes to be very familiar before they realize its Zeta's Lair and the dreams are Zeta and Nazboo's. Unfortunately they end up mixing the bags causing Zeta to get Nazboo's dream of cookies and Nazboo to get Zeta's dream to be the most powerful person in Zahramay Falls. Ezri however reveals that getting the wrong dream will cause the dreamer to start dream walking where they start acting out their dream. As a result Nazboo starts acting like Zeta due to the influence of her dream while Zeta starts acting like Nazboo due to the influence of his dream. Ezri and the girls must sprinkle the correct dust on Zeta and Nazboo to turn them to back to normal before sunrise or Ezri will fail his challenge. However under the influence of Zeta's dream, Nazboo plots to steal the girls genie gems just as Zeta normally does. Fortunately Leah realizes that Zeta under the influence of Nazboo's dream is the key to stopping Nazboo so Ezri can return them to normal.
59a	19a	"Brave-ish"	Enrico Vilbar Santana	Nicole Demerse	Roy Meurin	May 9, 2018	August 5, 2018	319	0.28
TBA
59b	19b	"Nazboo's Magic Kazoo"	David Knott	Michael Rabb	Steve Moore	May 9, 2018	August 5, 2018	319	0.28
TBA
60a	20a	"A Pirate Genie's Life for Me"	Carin-Anne Anderson	Francisco Paredes	Kate Brusk	November 20, 2018	December 2, 2018	320	N/A
Shimmer and Shine help Zora to locate a magical Rainbow Pearl, which would make her ship the most powerful one in the world. It is up to Shimmer and Shine to find the precious pearl. Zora and the girls must face challenges to procure it.
60b	20b	"Wacky Wishes"	Enrico Vilbar Santana	Andrew Blanchette	James Lopez	November 20, 2018	December 2, 2018	320	N/A
Princess Samira has an extraordinary magical wand that can make any wish come true. Excited to seize one for herself, Zeta snatches it and transforms herself into an enormous genie. Princess Samira and the girls must prevent Zeta from hurting other genies.

=== Season 4 (2018–20) ===
No. overall	No. in season	Title	Directed by	Written by	Storyboard by	U.S. air date	Canadian air date	Prod. code	U.S. viewers (millions)
61	1	"Welcome to Zahramay Skies"	Enrico Vilbar Santana and David Knott	Robert Lamoreaux & Michelle Lamoreaux	Roy Meurin and Steve Moore	October 20, 2018	November 11, 2018	402	0.53
Shimmer, Shine and Leah travel to a magical new land called Zahramay Skies and meet Adara, the Stardust Princess.: Note: This episode was aired as a 30 minute special.
62a	2a	"Pets to the Rescue"	Carin-Anne Anderson	Michael Rabb	Kate Brusk	October 20, 2018	November 18, 2018	403	0.47
When Zeta traps the girls in a magic bubble, Tala, Nahal and Parisa team up with the girls' Zahracorns to free them.
62b	2b	"Runaway Rainbow"	Enrico Vilbar Santana	Francisco Paredes	Lee-Roy Lahey	October 20, 2018	November 18, 2018	403	0.47
Shimmer, Shine and Leah meet Rubi, a Rainbow Genie-in-Training, whose rainbows quickly get out of control.
63a	3a	"Zeta Sleeps Over"	David Knott	Michael Rabb	Ron Brewer	November 19, 2018	March 10, 2019	413	0.23
A stinky bug infestation in Zeta's secret lair forces her to spend the night at Shimmer and Shine's palace.
63b	3b	"Genie Babies"	Carin-Anne Anderson	Francisco Paredes	Stark Howell	November 19, 2018	March 10, 2019	413	0.23
Zeta and Nazboo have to take care of Shimmer, Shine and Leah when a potion mishap turns them into little babies.
64a	4a	"Oceans Collide"	David Knott	Francisco Paredes	Ron Brewer	November 21, 2018	March 3, 2019	401	0.35
When Zeta takes some of Ula's powerful gems, Shimmer, Shine, Leah, Nila and Ula must work together to stop her.
64b	4b	"Par-Tea Time"	Carin-Anne Anderson	Andrew Blanchette	Stark Howell	November 21, 2018	March 3, 2019	401	0.35
When the girls go looking for the Zahramay Tea Flower, they run into cute little Fuzzle Whuzzles who complicate their quest.
65a	5a	"The Zahra-Star"	Enrico Vilbar Santana	Michael Rabb	Roy Meurin	January 6, 2019	February 17, 2019	405	0.38
Shimmer and Zahrora accidentally cause some trouble when they visit a new part of Zahramay Skies called Zahraconia.
65b	5b	"Lightning Strikes Twice"	David Knott	Francisco Paredes	Steve Moore	January 6, 2019	February 17, 2019	405	0.38
66a	6a	"Rainbows to the Rescue"	Carin-Anne Anderson	Andrew Blanchette	Kate Brusk	January 27, 2019	February 24, 2019	406	0.50
When flight magic disappears from Zahramay Skies, Rubi and the girls try to set things right, using rainbows to get around.
66b	6b	"Daydreams Come True"	Enrico Vilbar Santana	Robert Lamoreaux & Michelle Lamoreaux	Lee-Roy Lahey	January 27, 2019	February 24, 2019	406	0.50
When Zeta combines Daydream Dust with Dream Come True Dust, genies' daydreams start coming true and wreaking havoc.
67a	7a	"Costume Chaos"	Carin-Anne Anderson	Andrew Blanchette	Stark Howell	February 17, 2019	March 3, 2019	404	0.33
When costumes get magically stuck on Shimmer, Shine and Leah, they must track down a special feather to undo the magic.
67b	7b	"Potion School"	David Knott	Robert Lamoreaux & Michelle Lamoreaux	Ron Brewer	February 17, 2019	March 3, 2019	404	0.33
Zeta impersonates the girls' potions teacher and tricks them into helping her brew a sneaky potion.
68a	8a	"The Painting Gem"	David Knott	Michael Rabb	Ron Brewer	March 17, 2019	August 4, 2019	407	0.51
When Zeta gets a painting gem she creates artistic problems that girls need to control.
68b	8b	"Longest Day Ever"	Carin-Anne Anderson	Francisco Paredes	Stark Howell	March 17, 2019	August 4, 2019	407	0.51
When Leah accidentally wants the day to last forever, they need to figure out a way to make the moon rise to the sky by closing the day.
69a	9a	"The Zahracorn Salon"	David Knott	Michael Rabb	Steve Moore	April 7, 2019	August 11, 2019	408	0.38
The girls take Adara's Zahracorn to the salon, but must track her down when she gets spooked by all the salon magic.
69b	9b	"Zahracorn Tickles"	Enrico Vilbar Santana	Andrew Blanchette	Ron Meurin	April 7, 2019	August 11, 2019	408	0.38
The girls partake in a Zahracorn Race.
70a	10a	"The Sky Garden"	Carin-Anne Anderson	Robert Lamoreaux & Michelle Lamoreaux	Kate Brusk	May 12, 2019	June 25, 2019	409	0.36
When Adara's flowers will not bloom, the girls and their friend Minu travel to a Sky Garden to find a Zummingbird who can help.
70b	10b	"The Dragon Zahracorn"	Enrico Vilbar Santana	Francisco Paredes	Lee-Roy Lahey	May 12, 2019	June 25, 2019	409	0.36
Shimmer, Shine and Leah travel to the Dragon Forest to help Shaun track down an elusive, magical creature.
71a	11a	"Boom Zahra-Bake!"	Carin-Anne Anderson	Francisco Paredes	Kevin Cannarile	June 9, 2019	August 25, 2019	412	0.39
71b	11b	"Rocket's Big Bark"	Enrico Vilbar Santana	Andrew Blanchette	Lee-Roy Lahey	June 9, 2019	August 25, 2019	412	0.39
72a	12a	"Buddies in a Bottle"	David Knott	Andrew Blanchette	Ron Brewer	July 14, 2019	September 1, 2019	410	0.37
Zeta and Zac become trapped inside a magical bottle and need to find a way out before all their friends are sucked into it as well.
72b	12b	"The Gem Hunt"	Carin-Anne Anderson	Michael Rabb	Stark Howell	July 14, 2019	September 1, 2019	410	0.37
Zeta tries to stop the children from finding her secret cave when she sees them hunting for gems nearby.
73a	13a	"Zahracorns on Parade"	Enrico Vilbar Santana	Andrew Blanchette	Roy Meurin	August 11, 2019	November 23, 2019	414	0.25
Zeta uses a Zahracorn suit to sneak herself, Nazboo, and his family into the Zahracorn Parade, but the disguise goes haywire.
73b	13b	"Nazboo's Magic Robe"	David Knott	Michael Rabb	Kate Brusk and Kevin Cannarile	August 11, 2019	November 23, 2019	414	0.25
Zeta grows jealous when Nazboo gets an enchanted robe that allows him to do magic.
74a	14a	"Zeta's Sister"	Carin-Anne Anderson	Robert Lamoreaux & Michelle Lamoreaux	Steve Moore	September 8, 2019	TBA	415	0.38
74b	14b	"Sneaky Switcheroo"	Enrico Vilbar Santana	Rachel Forman	Lee-Roy Lahey	September 8, 2019	TBA	415	0.38
75	15	"The Dragon Rider"	David Knott and Enrico Vilbar Santana	Robert Lamoreaux & Michelle Lamoreaux	Roy Meurin and Steve Moore	October 20, 2019	January 28, 2020	411	0.37
76	16	"Legend of the Dragon Treasure"	David Knott, Carin-Anne Anderson and James Lopez	Francisco Paredes	Ron Brewer and Stark Howell	November 3, 2019	TBA	416	0.27
77a	17a	"Sneaky Squeaky Chicken"	Carin-Anne Anderson and James Lopez	Andrew Blanchette	Steven Wahl	November 10, 2019	TBA	417	0.31
77b	17b	"Adara's Bracelets"	David Knott	Michael Rabb	Steve Moore	November 10, 2019	TBA	417	0.31
78a	18a	"Nazboo Come Home"	Enrico Vilbar Santana	Francisco Paredes	Lee-Roy Lahey	November 17, 2019	TBA	418	0.31
78b	18b	"Surfing the Skies"	Enrico Vilbar Santana	Andrew Blanchette	Roy Meurin	November 17, 2019	TBA	418	0.31
79	19	"Journey to Zahramay Oceanea"	David Knott and James Lopez	Robert Lamoreaux & Michelle Lamoreaux	Ron Brewer and Stark Howell	November 24, 2019	December 28, 2019	419	0.36
80a	20a	"The Sea Enchantress"	Enrico Vilbar Santana	Andrew Blanchette	Roy Meurin	December 1, 2019	January 4, 2020	420	0.23
80b	20b	"The Dance of the Jellyfish"	David Knott	Michael Rabb	Frans Vischer	December 1, 2019	January 4, 2020	420	0.23
81a	21a	"Found You Day"	James Lopez	Francisco Paredes	Kevin Cannarile	December 8, 2019	January 11, 2020	421	0.30
81b	21b	"Nazboo Loses a Tooth"	Kimberly Jo Mills	Robert Lamoreaux & Michelle Lamoreaux	Lee-Roy Lahey	December 8, 2019	January 11, 2020	421	0.30
82a	22a	"Zeashell Surprise"	David Knott	Andrew Blanchette	Ron Brewer	December 15, 2019	January 18, 2020	422	0.27
82b	22b	"The Zahramay Zuffer-Puff"	James Lopez	Michael Rabb	Stark Howell	December 15, 2019	January 18, 2020	422	0.27
83a	23a	"Zadazzler Dizzaster"	Kimberly Jo Mills	Robert Lamoreaux & Michelle Lamoreaux	Roy Meurin	December 29, 2019	January 25, 2020	423	0.27
83b	23b	"Hotdog Havoc"	David Knott	Francisco Paredes	Frans Vischer	December 29, 2019	January 25, 2020	423	0.27
84a	24a	"Ladybugs on the Loose"	James Lopez	Andrew Blanchette	Ron Brewer	January 5, 2020	February 1, 2020	424	0.33
84b	24b	"Zeta the Powerless"	Kimberly Jo Mills	Michael Rabb	Lee-Roy Lahey	January 5, 2020	February 1, 2020	424	0.33
85a	25a	"Zeacorn Cove"	David Knott	Rachel Forman	Ron Brewer	January 26, 2020	February 8, 2020	425	0.24
85b	25b	"Lights of Oceanea"	James Lopez	Francisco Paredes	Roy Meurin	January 26, 2020	February 8, 2020	425	0.24
86a	26a	"Zahra-Zkunked"	Kimberly Jo Mills	Andrew Blanchette	Lauren Krieger	February 9, 2020	February 15, 2020	426	0.32
86b	26b	"The Sorcerenie"	David Knott	Robert Lamoreaux & Michelle Lamoreaux	Lee-Roy Lahey	February 9, 2020	February 15, 2020	426	0.32

=== Music videos ===
Treehouse TV debuted two in September 2017: Music Video on Monday the 4th to Friday the 8th and Music Video 2 on Friday the 15th.
