= List of PB&J Otter episodes =

The following is a list of episodes of the animated series PB&J Otter, which was broadcast on Playhouse Disney from March 14, 1998, to October 23, 2000.

Throughout its run, PB&J Otter produced a total of 65 half-hour episodes (124 segments) across three seasons.

== Series overview ==
| Season | Segments | Episodes | Originally released | |
| Season | Segments | Episodes | First released | Last released |
|---|---|---|---|---|
| 1 | 26 | 13 | March 14, 1998 | May 17, 1998 |
| 2 | 50 | 26 | May 1, 1999 | March 1, 2000 |
| 3 | 48 | 26 | March 26, 2000 | October 23, 2000 |

== Episodes ==
Every episode consists of at least one or more songs (with the exception of "A Sledding We Will Go" and "Dare Duck"), as well as an interstitial "Noodle Dance" for each problem to solve.

Note: Every episode was directed by Jeff Buckland.

=== Season 1 (1998) ===
| No. overall | No. in season | Title | Written by (Note: Information is taken from the closing credits of each episode.) | Storyboarded by | Original release date | Prod. code |
|---|---|---|---|---|---|---|
| 1 | 1 | "Bye, Bye PB&J" | Jeff Kindley | Barking Bullfrog Cartoon Co. | March 14, 1998 | 001 |
| 1 | 1 | "Babbleberry Day" | Jeff Kindley | Jim Caswell | March 14, 1998 | 001 |
A huge misunderstanding leads to everyone in Lake Hoohaw thinking that PB&J are moving away. When Ernest can't pick babbleberries for Opal's babbleberry turnovers to sell at his store, PB&J volunteer to pick them.
| 2 | 2 | "The Treasure of Hoohaw Rock" | Jeff Buckland | Liz Rathke Bakunovich | March 21, 1998 | 002 |
| 2 | 2 | "A Sledding We Will Go" | Heather L. Heath | Dick Codor | March 21, 1998 | 002 |
Mayor Jeff takes PB&J on a treasure hunt to find his lost toys that he hid from his sister. PB&J try to find a sled after realizing that they don't have one.
| 3 | 3 | "Bagpipe Blues" | Anne Baumgarten & Bruce Shelly | Barking Bullfrog Cartoon Co. | March 22, 1998 | 004 |
| 3 | 3 | "You Can't Come In" | Anne Baumgarten & Bruce Shelly | Bill Peckmann | March 22, 1998 | 004 |
Peanut takes Ernest's family heirloom bagpipes without asking and accidentally drops them in the lake. After being refused admission into Ootsie and Bootsie's clubhouse boat, PB&J, Pinch, Munchy and Flick decide to create their own individual clubhouses.
| 4 | 4 | "Go Away, Gorilla" | Eric Weiner | Liz Rathke Bakunovich | March 28, 1998 | 005 |
| 4 | 4 | "Mama for a Day" | Becky Mode | Miho Sakai Moyer | March 28, 1998 | 005 |
PB&J suspect that there is a gorilla hiding in their bedroom. When Opal comes down with a cold and must rest in bed for the day, PB&J decide to do the household chores for her.
| 5 | 5 | "Born to Chirp" | Jeff Kindley | Otis Brayboy | March 29, 1998 | 003 |
| 5 | 5 | "Mega Melon" | Jeff Buckland | David Concepcion | March 29, 1998 | 003 |
While playing in the yard, Jelly finds and captures a grasshopper, but it later escapes. PB&J keep an eye on one of Mayor Jeff's prized melons.
| 6 | 6 | "The Silent Treatment" | Becky Mode | David Concepcion | April 4, 1998 | 006 |
| 6 | 6 | "Picture Perfect" | Eric Weiner | Jim Caswell | April 4, 1998 | 006 |
When Pinch gives Jelly a bad makeover, they get into a fight and refuse to speak to each other. Peanut and Jelly try to keep Butter from playing in the mud so they can all stay clean for the upcoming family picture.
| 7 | 7 | "Invitation to the Snooties" | Chris Moore | Barking Bullfrog Cartoon Co. | April 5, 1998 | 007 |
| 7 | 7 | "Too Hot for Fishsicles" | Chris Moore | Otis Brayboy | April 5, 1998 | 007 |
PB&J think they're not invited to Ootsie and Bootsie's birthday party after Wanda accidentally dropped their invitation in the lake. The citizens of Lake Hoohaw try to stay cool during a heatwave.
| 8 | 8 | "Otter in the Water" | Anne Baumgarten & Bruce Shelly | Liz Rathke Bakunovich | April 12, 1998 | 008 |
| 8 | 8 | "All Popped Out" | Anne Baumgarten & Bruce Shelly | Dave Simons | April 12, 1998 | 008 |
Peanut persuades Jelly to overcome her fear of the water before their water volleyball tournament against Munchy and Flick. Ernest shows PB&J a popcorn machine and when he has to step out for a while, PB&J decide to make the popcorn themselves.
| 9 | 9 | "Nothin' But the Tooth" | Jeff Buckland | Tony Eastman | April 19, 1998 | 009 |
| 9 | 9 | "Special Delivery" | Jeff Buckland | Jim Caswell | April 19, 1998 | 009 |
PB&J plan to trick the tooth fairy so they can have money to buy Opal a good birthday present. Peanut sends away for a Super Spy Ring from the back of a Frosted Flounder Flakes cereal box.
| 10 | 10 | "Soap Box Derby Day" | Heather L. Heath | Barking Bullfrog Cartoon Co. | April 26, 1998 | 010 |
| 10 | 10 | "Howdy Hoohaw Day" | Becky Mode | Otis Brayboy | April 26, 1998 | 010 |
PB&J, Pinch, Munchy and Flick decide to have a soap box derby race. When Peanut is chosen for the lead role in the Hoohaw Day play, he begins to suffer from severe stage fright.
| 11 | 11 | "Butter the Balloonatic" | Jim Rubin | Liz Rathke Bakunovich | May 3, 1998 | 011 |
| 11 | 11 | "Gizmotronictron Raffle" | Jim Rubin | David Concepcion | May 3, 1998 | 011 |
When Butter's red balloon mysteriously vanishes, Peanut and Jelly think Flick stole it. Peanut sets out to buy a raffle ticket to win a Gizmotronictron, a machine that will do all the household chores, before Ootsie and Bootsie can do so.
| 12 | 12 | "Dare Duck" | Anne Baumgarten & Bruce Shelly | Lee Corey | May 10, 1998 | 012 |
| 12 | 12 | "Otters of the Wild" | Jeff Buckland | Jim Caswell | May 10, 1998 | 012 |
Flick dares Peanut to go along with him to a dangerous and forbidden cave. The Otters are planning a campout, but Peanut and Jelly pack too much equipment and invite all their friends along.
| 13 | 13 | "Big Time Bass-Off Contest" | Anne Baumgarten & Bruce Shelly | Barking Bullfrog Cartoon Co. | May 17, 1998 | 013 |
| 13 | 13 | "The Sleeping Beagle" | Jeff Buckland | Otis Brayboy | May 17, 1998 | 013 |
When Ernest is unable to buy a new fishing pole for the Snooties' fishing contest, PB&J make him a homemade one. When a rainy day ruins the Otters' plans to go see a performance of "The Sleeping Beagle" on the Show Boat, PB&J, Pinch, Munchy and Flick decide to stage their own performance of the story. Note: "The Sleeping Beagle" parodies the tale of "Sleeping Beauty."

=== Season 2 (1999–2000) ===
| No. overall | No. in season | Title (Note: Alternate titles are sourced from the United States Copyright Office.) | Written by | Original release date | Prod. code |
|---|---|---|---|---|---|
| 14 | 1 | "Gotta Dance" | Eric Weiner | May 1, 1999 | 018 |
| 14 | 1 | "Otter Pox" | Eric Weiner | May 1, 1999 | 018 |
After Wanda accidentally ruined all the pies for a pie-tasting contest, the citizens decide to have a make-up-your-own-dance contest instead. Jelly gets otter pox on her birthday and she and Peanut try to find a way for her to be at her party when she is forced to stay in her room.
| 15 | 2 | "The Dollhouse" "Dollhouse Disaster" | Eric Weiner | May 2, 1999 | 019 |
| 15 | 2 | "The Tell-Tale Candy Wrapper" | Eric Weiner | May 2, 1999 | 019 |
When Munchy accidentally eats Pinch's new wooden dollhouse under the misconception that she is throwing it out, PB&J try to help him find a way to tell her the truth. Flick eats all of PB&J's candy and tries to hide it, even when he gets a candy wrapper stuck to his feathers and PB&J get punished for his misdeed.
| 16 | 3 | "Eye Spy" | Jeff Buckland | May 16, 1999 | 020 |
| 16 | 3 | "Happy Harmony" | Jeff Buckland | May 16, 1999 | 020 |
Flick is embarrassed that he has to wear reading glasses. When Mayor Jeff hears an argument between Peanut and Jelly, he tells them a story about a similar argument between a barber and a young woman.
| 17 | 4 | "Strike Up the Band" | Gary Apple | June 6, 1999 | 021 |
| 17 | 4 | "World's Strongest Otter" | Gary Apple | June 6, 1999 | 021 |
After playing a Mother's Day song for Opal on homemade instruments, PB&J decide to perform it for all the mothers in Lake Hoohaw. When Peanut fails to pass a test of strength at the local fair one night, he wishes he were as strong as the bodybuilders on TV.
| 18 | 5 | "Come Back, Little Monster" | Jim Rubin | June 13, 1999 | 022 |
| 18 | 5 | "The Big Sweep" | Jim Rubin | June 13, 1999 | 022 |
Jelly sees a manatee named Kevin in the lake, but her friends don't believe her because Kevin keeps going away whenever they come. PB&J search their messy room for Peanut's special blue marble.
| 19 | 6 | "Butter Tags Along" | Susan Kim | June 27, 1999 | 023 |
| 19 | 6 | "Flick's Big Find" | Susan Kim | June 27, 1999 | 023 |
Butter secretly tags along with Peanut, Munchy and Flick on their trip around the world. Flick finds one of Ootsie and Bootsie's toys and wants to keep it.
| 20 | 7 | "Tub O' Butter" | Eric Weiner | July 18, 1999 | 014 |
| 20 | 7 | "El Dorado, Seat of Gold" | Eric Weiner | July 18, 1999 | 014 |
Peanut and Jelly try to convince Butter to take her bath so they can be in bed by 8:00 and still have time to read their bedtime books. PB&J secretly take Mayor Jeff's main attraction of his toilet seat exhibit, but accidentally lose it.
| 21 | 8 | "Mayor Flick" | Jeff Buckland | July 18, 1999 | 015 |
| 21 | 8 | "The Greatest Sleepover Ever" | Jeff Buckland | July 18, 1999 | 015 |
Flick is chosen to be the mayor of the kids while Mayor Jeff goes fishing, but when Pinch, Munchy, Ootsie and Bootsie all have problems and Flick is nowhere to be found, PB&J help them instead. Ootsie and Bootsie spend the night at PB&J's house while their parents are away, but none of them can agree on anything.
| 22 | 9 | "Save Oaky Oak Tree" | Jim Rubin and Eric Weiner | July 18, 1999 | 016 |
| 22 | 9 | "The Duck Who Cried Wolf" | Jim Rubin | July 18, 1999 | 016 |
PB&J, Pinch and Munchy try to stop Ootsie and Bootsie from cutting down their favorite tree. While on a campout, Flick keeps telling PB&J that a bear is coming and he thinks it's funny until a real bear shows up.
| 23 | 10 | "Poor Bubbles" | Jeff Buckland | July 18, 1999 | 017 |
| 23 | 10 | "Poodle Power" | Jeff Buckland | July 18, 1999 | 017 |
Bubbles isn't feeling happy, so PB&J try their best to cheer him up. When Ootsie and Bootsie's new video game accidentally causes a blackout, PB&J try to show them that they don't need fancy electronic toys to have fun.
| 24 | 11 | "Forgive Me Not" | Dennis Garvey and Tom Nichols | August 22, 1999 | 024 |
| 24 | 11 | "These Shoes Are Made for Walking" | Dennis Garvey and Tom Nichols | August 22, 1999 | 024 |
Pinch accidentally rips Jelly's prized rodeo cape and Jelly refuses to forgive her. When Ootsie and Bootsie brag about their new airplane shoes and make fun of Peanut's shoes, Peanut is determined to get a pair.
| 25 | 12 | "Mama Peanut" | Jim Rubin | August 29, 1999 | 025 |
| 25 | 12 | "Bye-Bye Bubbles" | David Schaye | August 29, 1999 | 025 |
A baby turtle mistakes Peanut for his mother and begins following him around everywhere. Bubbles is missing and PB&J try to find him.
| 26 | 13 | "Practice Makes Perfect" | David Schaye | August 30, 1999 | 026 |
| 26 | 13 | "Three's a Crowd" | David Schaye | August 30, 1999 | 026 |
Peanut tries to learn how to ride a bike while Flick tries to learn how to climb a tree. When Opal babysits the Muskrats' newborn triplets, PB&J feel ignored.
| 27 | 14 | "Lost and Found" | Don Gillies | September 11, 1999 | 027 |
| 27 | 14 | "Sherlock Otter" | Don Gillies | September 11, 1999 | 027 |
Peanut and Jelly accidentally get separated from their parents at the Snooties' carnival. When objects around the Otters' house begin to disappear, Peanut and Jelly become detectives to solve the case.
| 28 | 15 | "I'll Be Your Best Friend" | Heather L. Heath | September 25, 1999 | 028 |
| 28 | 15 | "Otterly Alone" | Heather L. Heath | September 25, 1999 | 028 |
Peanut wins two tickets to a Bucky Spacebeaver show and has a tough time deciding on whether to take Munchy or Flick. Mayor Jeff babysits PB&J while Opal and Ernest are gone for the day.
| 29 | 16 | "Lemon-itis" | Dennis Garvey and Tom Nichols | September 26, 1999 | 029 |
| 29 | 16 | "Duckbird Alert" | Dennis Garvey and Tom Nichols | September 26, 1999 | 029 |
Peanut wants to raise enough money to buy a Bucky Spacebeaver Hover Helmet at the same time the Otters receive a giant lemon and Opal keeps making lemon-themed meals. Flick wants to learn how to fly.
| 30 | 17 | "Follow Your Nose" | Eric Weiner | November 23, 1999 | 030 |
While out on a picnic in the woods, PB&J and Flick meet a family of underground-dwelling moles. Note: This episode was produced in association with the American Foundation for the Blind.
| 31 | 18 | "The Ice Moose" | Eric Weiner | December 6, 1999 | 031 |
It's the season of Hoohaw Hoo, but Flick isn't feeling the spirit. Guest star: Harry Belafonte as Old Tim, the Ice Moose
| 32 | 19 | "Baby Butter's Bankie" | Becky Mode | December 19, 1999 | 032 |
| 32 | 19 | "Three Super Otters" | Becky Mode | December 19, 1999 | 032 |
PB&J find Butter's long-lost beloved blanket in the basement. PB&J and Munchy play superheroes when Pinch's favorite doll falls into the fast-moving stream.
| 33 | 20 | "Butter's First Check-Up" | Don Gillies | January 1, 2000 | 033 |
| 33 | 20 | "The Legend of Ponce de L'Otter" | Don Gillies | January 1, 2000 | 033 |
Butter is nervous about her first dentist appointment, so Peanut and Jelly try to help her. Guest star: Lori Alan as Dr. Molar Fox After Mayor Jeff tells PB&J a story about a legendary telescope that fell into the bottom of the lake, they set out to find it.
| 34 | 21 | "Gotcha!" | Gary Apple | January 2, 2000 | 034 |
| 34 | 21 | "The Mysterious Mirror" | Gary Apple | January 2, 2000 | 034 |
Peanut, Jelly, Pinch and Munchy are scared after watching a scary movie, so Flick starts scaring them. Jelly finds a mirror in the sand and is convinced that it's lucky.
| 35 | 22 | "A Tree Grows in Hoohaw" | Jim Rubin | January 22, 2000 | 035 |
| 35 | 22 | "Flick's Big Fakeout" | Jim Rubin | January 22, 2000 | 035 |
When an old pine tree that has been in Mayor Jeff's family for years begins to get very sick, PB&J try to nurse it back to health. Flick is jealous of all the attention that Pinch, who broke her leg in a sledding accident, is getting, so he decides to fake an injury.
| 36 | 23 | "This Little Light of Mine" | Eric Weiner | January 30, 2000 | 036 |
| 36 | 23 | "Look Ma, No Hands" | Eric Weiner | January 30, 2000 | 036 |
Peanut and Jelly capture a firefly, but Butter sets it free. PB&J try to learn fancy poodle manners for a dinner party at the Snooties' mansion.
| 37 | 24 | "The Great Water Race" | Jim Rubin | August 29, 1999 | 037 |
| 37 | 24 | "Be Nice to Beavers" | Susan Kim | February 6, 2000 | 037 |
Flick challenges Peanut and Jelly to an inner tube race, but Peanut and Jelly are forced to take Butter with them. Munchy thinks PB&J, Pinch and Flick are being mean to him.
| 38 | 25 | "Chez Otter" | David Schaye | February 13, 2000 | 038 |
| 38 | 25 | "Hooray for Peanut" | David Schaye | February 13, 2000 | 038 |
When Ernest can't take Opal to a fancy restaurant for their anniversary, PB&J decide to make their own restaurant. Butter saves Wanda from crashing her boat by ringing the Cranes' new emergency bell, but Peanut is mistakenly given credit.
| 39 | 26 | "Kid Court" | Gary Apple | March 1, 2000 | 039 |
| 39 | 26 | "A Frog Named Measles" | Gary Apple | March 1, 2000 | 039 |
Pinch becomes the judge of a courtroom trial to see which TV show PB&J get to watch. Munchy has just recovered from a case of the measles and is shocked when he comes to think that PB&J want to make him sick again.

=== Season 3 (2000) ===
| No. overall | No. in season | Title | Written by | Original release date | Prod. code |
|---|---|---|---|---|---|
| 40 | 1 | "No Hands, No Feet, No Wings" | Jeff Buckland | March 26, 2000 | 040 |
| 40 | 1 | "Let's Help Dad" | Jeff Buckland | March 26, 2000 | 040 |
When the kids start arguing over what game to play, Mayor Jeff shows them a new kind of game where they work together. PB&J try to help Ernest with his deliveries so that he can get off work early and they can have a cookout.
| 41 | 2 | "The Funky Band" | David Schaye | April 2, 2000 | 041 |
| 41 | 2 | "The Singin' Kid" | David Schaye | April 2, 2000 | 041 |
PB&J form a band, but Ootsie and Bootsie become left out and bribe Pinch, Scootch, Munchy and Flick to play with them instead of PB&J. After winning a singing competition at the fair, Jelly begins acting like a big show-off like her idol Odella Otter.
| 42 | 3 | "The Johnny Pompalope Story" | Jim Rubin | April 9, 2000 | 042 |
| 42 | 3 | "The Soapbox Boat Race" | Jim Rubin | April 9, 2000 | 042 |
When Aunt Nanner is unable to finish a book about the explorer who planted pompalopes on Lake Hoohaw, PB&J, Pinch, Munchy and Flick think of their own ending. Guest star: Thomas McHugh as Johnny Pompalope Note: "The Johnny Pompalope Story" is derived from Johnny Appleseed. The kids build soapbox boats for a big race.
| 43 | 4 | "Aunt Nanner's Special Place" | Anne Baumgarten and Bruce Shelly | April 16, 2000 | 043 |
| 43 | 4 | "Munchy's Sinking Feeling" | Anne Baumgarten and Bruce Shelly | April 16, 2000 | 043 |
Aunt Nanner takes PB&J, Munchy and Flick on a hike to find the secret swimming hole that she and Opal discovered when they were kids. When Munchy's toy sailboat gets destroyed by Walter's recycling boat, PB&J, Pinch and Flick try to cheer him up.
| 44 | 5 | "The Mystery Crate" | David Schaye | April 23, 2000 | 044 |
| 44 | 5 | "It's a Bird, It's a Plane... It's an Elephant?" | David Schaye | April 23, 2000 | 044 |
PB&J receive a big present from Aunt Nanner with instructions not to open it until she arrives. A weasel named Merriwether's hot-air balloon accidentally gets stuck in a tree near Lake Hoohaw.
| 45 | 6 | "Whistling Up the Wrong Munchy" | Cliff MacGillivray | April 30, 2000 | 045 |
| 45 | 6 | "Billy the Duck" | Cliff MacGillivray | April 30, 2000 | 045 |
PB&J, Pinch and Flick find out that Munchy can whistle and push him into performing in front of the entire town. When Flick's cousin Billy comes to visit, PB&J, Pinch, Scootch, Munchy and Flick try to avoid him because they think he's a bully.
| 46 | 7 | "Opal's Magic Mud Party" | Jeffrey Scott | May 7, 2000 | 046 |
| 46 | 7 | "Leave It to Munchy" | Jeffrey Scott | May 7, 2000 | 046 |
PB&J help Opal make a batch of her Magic Mud facial for a party at the Snooties. Munchy is embarrassed after saying something silly, so he decides to stop talking.
| 47 | 8 | "Peanut Overboard" | Moss Freedman | May 14, 2000 | 047 |
| 47 | 8 | "Come Back, Mama" | Robert David | May 14, 2000 | 047 |
Peanut makes a sailboat out of fishsicle sticks, but feels sad when his friends say they don't like it as much as he thought they would. After Opal returns from a week-long trip at Aunt Nanner's, Butter starts clinging to Opal.
| 48 | 9 | "Hoohaw is Where the Heart Is" | Reed Shelly | May 21, 2000 | 049 |
| 48 | 9 | "Everything in Its Place" | Greg Lee | May 21, 2000 | 049 |
PB&J mistakenly think Aunt Nanner is bored of Lake Hoohaw after hearing stories of her world adventures. PB&J try to find their life jackets so they can go on Mayor Jeff's boat ride.
| 49 | 10 | "On the Right Track" | Reed Shelly | May 28, 2000 | 050 |
| 49 | 10 | "Itchy Situation" | Erica A. Beeney | May 28, 2000 | 050 |
Jelly accidentally sprains her ankle on the day of the annual track games. Peanut, Jelly, Ernest, Ootsie, Bootsie and Edouard climb Mt. Hoohaw.
| 50 | 11 | "The Big Surprise" | David Schaye | June 4, 2000 | 051 |
| 50 | 11 | "Bazania Mania" | David Schaye | June 4, 2000 | 051 |
When Mayor Jeff's requested statue of Captain Gazpacho for the Captain Gazpacho Day festival ends up too big, PB&J, Mayor Jeff and his friend Woodrow Woodchuck try to figure out how to get it down the lake. PB&J accidentally sell Opal's rare Bazania flower to Ootsie and Bootsie at their yard sale.
| 51 | 12 | "Sergeant Gravel to the Rescue" | Jeff Buckland | June 11, 2000 | 052 |
| 51 | 12 | "Sleepyhead" | Robert Askin | June 11, 2000 | 052 |
Peanut loses his library book and it's due on the same day. Walter announces that he is being rewarded as Lake Hoohaw's Recycling Hero of the Year and PB&J, Pinch, Scootch and Flick try to make sure he gets a good day's sleep for his big night.
| 52 | 13 | "Watchbird Alert" | Jeff Buckland | June 18, 2000 | 053 |
| 52 | 13 | "Flick's Hat Trick" | Gary Apple | June 18, 2000 | 053 |
The Cranes stay with the Otters after their treehouse is destroyed. Flick gets a new soccer hat for an upcoming game and refuses to take it off.
| 53 | 14 | "A Very Surprising Party" | Jeffrey Scott | June 25, 2000 | 054 |
| 53 | 14 | "Easy Pickings" | Don Gillies | June 25, 2000 | 054 |
When the Snooties lose their money, PB&J enlist the help of the citizens to throw them a big party to impress Edouard's boss so they won't have to move away. Peanut, Jelly, Ootsie and Bootsie open a babbleberry stand.
| 54 | 15 | "Collector's Edition" | Dennis Garvey and Tommy Nichols | July 2, 2000 | 055 |
| 54 | 15 | "Trading Places" | Anne Baumgarten and Bruce Shelly | July 2, 2000 | 055 |
Flick gets the first issue of Mallard Man, but Ootsie and Bootsie try to buy it from him because it's the one comic book that Edouard doesn't have in his collection. The Otters housesit for the Snooties while they go on vacation.
| 55 | 16 | "Munchy's No Big Deal" | Reed Shelly | July 9, 2000 | 056 |
| 55 | 16 | "Bubbles' Beginnings" | Danny Campbell and Kimberly Sellers Campbell | July 9, 2000 | 056 |
PB&J, Pinch and Flick decide to have sleepovers at each other's houses, but Munchy doesn't want to attend any of them after discovering that he talks in his sleep. PB&J tell Munchy the story of how they got Bubbles.
| 56 | 17 | "Soccer Surprise" | Dennis Garvey and Tommy Nichols | July 16, 2000 | 057 |
| 56 | 17 | "Baking Blues" | Martha Moran | July 16, 2000 | 057 |
Otto the bear, a former soccer player and a friend of Mayor Jeff's, stays with the Otters. PB&J help Opal bake bread, but they add too much yeast.
| 57 | 18 | "Thanks for the Giggle Melon" | Dennis Garvey and Tommy Nichols | July 23, 2000 | 058 |
Jelly tries to grow giggle melons even though everyone says it is impossible.
| 58 | 19 | "Hope Castle" | Michael Maurer | July 30, 2000 | 059 |
After taking a tour of Fort Gazpacho, PB&J, Pinch, Scootch, Munchy and Flick decide to create their own monument: a sandcastle, but a storm threatens to ruin it.
| 59 | 20 | "Where Oh Where is Flick?" | Anne Baumgarten and Bruce Shelly | August 6, 2000 | 060 |
| 59 | 20 | "Win, Win, Winner" | Anne Baumgarten and Bruce Shelly | August 6, 2000 | 060 |
After staying up all night reading a Mallard Man comic book, a drowsy Flick wanders away without Shirley knowing. Tired of losing soccer games, Flick quits Peanut and Jelly's soccer team and joins another one.
| 60 | 21 | "Easy as Pie" | Robert Askin | August 20, 2000 | 061 |
| 60 | 21 | "Pinky Pledge" | Reed Shelly | August 20, 2000 | 061 |
Flick receives a fancy pie from the Snooties and can't decide whether or not to share it with his friends. When Walter gets a new job offer in the far away town of Lake Walla-Walla Bing-Bang, the Raccoons might have to move, so PB&J, Munchy and Flick try to find a way for Pinch to stay.
| 61 | 22 | "Peanut Cries 'Uncle'" | David Schaye | August 25, 2000 | 062 |
| 61 | 22 | "Nanner Says, 'I Do'" | David Schaye | August 25, 2000 | 062 |
When Aunt Nanner's friend Redolfo spends the day with the Otters while his boat is getting fixed, Peanut starts to feel left out. In a cliffhanger ending, Redolfo asks Aunt Nanner to marry him. Continuing where the previous episode left off, Aunt Nanner and Redolfo return to Lake Hoohaw and announce that they're getting married. PB&J try to find the perfect wedding present for them.
| 62 | 23 | "Big Beaver Day" | Robert David | August 27, 2000 | 063 |
| 62 | 23 | "The Thing That Almost Ate Hoohaw" | Jim Rubin | August 27, 2000 | 063 |
Munchy faces new responsibilities after his Big Beaver Day. When Mayor Jeff sees a serpent-like creature in the lake, the kids think of what their favorite superheroes would do in the situation. Note: This is the only episode to use digital ink-and-paint animation as every other episode is used with traditional hand-painted "cel" animation method.
| 63 | 24 | "Ducking Out on Valentine's Day" | Anne Baumgarten and Bruce Shelly | September 3, 2000 | 064 |
| 63 | 24 | "Opal and the New Otter" | Anne Baumgarten and Bruce Shelly | September 3, 2000 | 064 |
Flick swears off Valentine's Day and refuses Valentines from anyone after not receiving a Valentine from Ootsie and Bootsie. When Opal overhears Jelly saying that she doesn’t like Pinch’s visiting cousin Ricky, she tells her the story of how she and Ernest met to show her that she should never judge someone before she gets to know them.
| 64 | 25 | "Goodbye Lake Hoohaw" | Reed Shelly | September 10, 2000 | 065 |
Mr. Bigdog wants to drain Lake Hoohaw, and the citizens try to get him to change his mind. Note: This episode was produced as the series finale.
| 65 | 26 | "A Hoohaw Halloween" "Happy Hoohaw Halloween" | Anne Baumgarten and Bruce Shelly | October 23, 2000 | 048 |
On Halloween night, Pinch must bravely go trick-or-treating all by herself when PB&J get stomachaches and can't be with her.
