= 44 (album) =

Studio album by Joel Plaskett
- Released: April 17, 2020
- Recorded: Dartmouth, Memphis, Nashville and Toronto
- Studio: Scotland Yard, Dartmouth, Nova Scotia; Memphis Magnetic Recording, Memphis
- Genre: Indie rock Rock; Folk rock Folk
- Length: 158 minutes
- Label: Pheromone Recordings

Joel Plaskett chronology
| Solidarity (2017) | 44 (2020) |

44 is the sixth solo album by Canadian indie rock musician Joel Plaskett, released on April 17, 2020. Dubbed the "spiritual successor" to Plaskett's prior triple album Three, the 44-song, quadruple album was released the day before the artist's 45th birthday. (As a tie-in to that fact, the LP box set contains a bonus 45th track.) Plaskett recorded the album across Dartmouth, Nova Scotia, Memphis, Nashville and Toronto, having worked with 33 other musicians over four years.

== Background ==
Each of the four records in the album contains 11 songs, with their own title and theme. The first record (41: Carried Away) is centred around travelling, the second collection (42: Just Passing Through) turns to finding a homecoming unfamiliar, the third set (43: If There's Another Road) tackles transitioning from lost to found, and the last record (44: The Window Inn) deals with arriving at a personal destination.

Collaborators include Plaskett's band the Emergency, as well as his former group from the nineties Thrush Hermit; members of Sloan and Local Rabbits; fellow Maritimer and mentee of Plaskett Mo Kenney; Dave Shouse of past bands Grifters and Those Bastard Souls; Nashville-based Canadians Rob Crowell and Steve Dawson; the vocalist trio Reeny, Mahalia and Micah Smith; East Coast songwriters Al Tuck, Rose Cousins, and Erin Costelo; folk singer-songwriters Charlotte Cornfield and Ana Egge; and Plaskett's son, Xianing.

The cross-Canada album tour for 44 had been scheduled for April–May, 2020 but was pushed back to October–November, 2020 due to the 2019-2020 coronavirus pandemic.

== Critical reception ==
A hometown review in Halifax's Chronicle Herald summed up the album as, "autobiographical, philosophical, psychoanalytical and spiritual." Another review called it a mix of everything, an eclectic collection from a prolific artist full of multitudes: "rock and pop, country and folk, loud and quiet, electric and acoustic, earthy and spacey, sincere and silly, gems and duds, studio and live, full-band productions and lo-fi solo fare." One critic described the title single from the third record, If There's Another Road as "comfort food." The expansive album was said to be a "massive, eclectic" reflection on the depth and breadth of the artist's life journey; "an impressive retrospective." Also focusing on the reflective nature of the album, a Globe and Mail review noted how the album was a labour of love to Plaskett's family and friends, and the years-long effort displayed "the value of slowing down to enjoy the moment."

The album was longlisted for the 2020 Polaris Music Prize.

== Track listing ==
All tracks are written by Joel Plaskett, except where noted

41: Carried Away
| No. | Title | Writer(s) | Length |
|---|---|---|---|
| 1. | "Collusion" |
| 2. | "Highland Heart" |
| 3. | "Complicated Love" |
| 4. | "Memory Complete Me" |
| 5. | "Beholden" |
| 6. | "Head over Heels into Heaven" | Joel Plaskett & Mo Kenney |
| 7. | "The Song About the Midway" | Joni Mitchell |
| 8. | "Carried Away" |
| 9. | "Matthew Grimson Songs" | Plaskett & Matthew Grimson |
| 10. | "The Right Direction" | Joel Plaskett, Bill Plaskett & Lynn Jones |
| 11. | "Spinning Out" |

42: Just Passing Through
| No. | Title | Writer(s) | Length |
|---|---|---|---|
| 1. | "Just Passing Through" |
| 2. | "Hey Stu!" |
| 3. | "The Wizard of Taz" |
| 4. | "Tim" |
| 5. | "Brand New & Brokenhearted" |
| 6. | "Spray Tan" |
| 7. | "Action, Camera, Lights" |
| 8. | "So Many Words" |
| 9. | "Lonely Limbo" |
| 10. | "Blowing a Kiss" |
| 11. | "Catch 22" | Joel Plaskett, Doug Easley & Dave Shouse |

43: If There's Another Road
| No. | Title | Writer(s) | Length |
|---|---|---|---|
| 1. | "Renegade" |
| 2. | "Disappear Me" |
| 3. | "At My Door" |
| 4. | "If There's Another Road" |
| 5. | "Charade" |
| 6. | "Kingfisher" |
| 7. | "Dxx" |
| 8. | "I Lost It" | Lucinda Gayle Williams |
| 9. | "Just Because" |
| 10. | "Fall Guy" |
| 11. | "Ps & Qs" |

44: The Window Inn
| No. | Title | Writer(s) | Length |
|---|---|---|---|
| 1. | "The Window Inn" |
| 2. | "West Cork Blended Irish Whiskey" |
| 3. | "It All Reappears" | Joel Plaskett & Mo Kenney |
| 4. | "Strange to Be Involved" | Robert Benvie |
| 5. | "The Bottom" | Dennis Ellsworth |
| 6. | "Is This Actually On" |
| 7. | "Melt the Universe with Brotherly Love" |
| 8. | "Rock Paper Scissors Meteor" | Joel Plaskett, Xianing Plaskett, Dave Shouse & Doug Easley |
| 9. | "Flaming Star" | Sherman Edwards |
| 10. | "There's More Out There in Here" |
| 11. | "A Benefit 4 Dreamland" |

45-rpm seven-inch bonus single (LP box set)
| No. | Title | Length |
|---|---|---|
| 1. | "Curtain Call at the Polish Hall" |
