= Party of One (disambiguation) =

Party of One is the 1990 album by Nick Lowe.

Party of One may also refer to:

== Music ==
- Party of One (band), an indie rock group from Minneapolis
- Party of One (Peter Elkas album), 2003 album
- Party of One (EP), 2016 EP by Mayer Hawthorne
- Party of One (George Thorogood album), 2017 album
- Party of One (Brandi Carlile song), 2018 song

== Other uses ==
- Party of One, 1986 stand-up comedy special by Elayne Boosler
- Party of One (My Little Pony: Friendship Is Magic), an episode of My Little Pony: Friendship Is Magic
- Party of One (podcast), a tabletop role-playing game podcast
