= La De Da (album) =

Studio album by Joel Plaskett
- Released: 2005; 2006 (re-release)
- Recorded: Flying Blanket, Mesa, Arizona; 2004
- Genres: Indie rock Country rock
- Length: 45:07
- Label: MapleMusic
- Producers: Joel Plaskett; Ian McGettigan; Bob Hoag

Joel Plaskett chronology
Truthfully Truthfully (2003)	La De Da (2005)	Make a Little Noise (2006)

Professional ratings
Review scores
Source	Rating
Edmonton Sun	link

La De Da is the second solo album by Joel Plaskett, released in 2005, following two albums released under the band name Joel Plaskett Emergency. The 2006 release also includes the three-song EP Make a Little Noise, by Joel Plaskett Emergency which was also released as a bonus CD with the Make a Little Noise DVD.

Vish Khanna of Exclaim! described it as "an eclectic, folk-pop travelogue that ranks with some of [Plaskett's] best work."

== Track listing ==
All songs written by Joel Plaskett except where noted.

1. "Absentminded Melody" – 1:40
2. "Happen Now" – 3:28
3. "Lonely Love" – 2:59
4. "Lying on a Beach" – 6:02
5. "Television Set" – 2:25
6. "Truth Be Told" – 3:05
7. "Wishing Well" (Al Tuck) – 4:06
8. "Non-Believer" – 4:37
9. "Nina and Albert" – 3:16
10. "Paralyzed" – 3:39
11. "Natural Disaster" – 5:36
12. "Love This Town" – 3:30

== Album credits ==
=== Personnel ===
- Joel Plaskett: vocals, guitars, keyboards, and "a bit of everything"
- Bob Hoag: percussion and backing vocals on Tracks 2,4,7,8
- Ian McGettigan: bass on Tracks 4,6,7,8
- Jon Rauhouse: pedal steel on Tracks 3,4,7,11,12

=== Production ===
- Produced by Joel Plaskett, Bob Hoag, and Ian McGettigan
- Recorded and Mixed at Flying Blanket in Mesa, Arizona (Summer 2004)
- Mastered by Brett Zilahi at Joao Carvahlo Mastering, Toronto, Ontario (August 20, 2004)

== Make a Little Noise (2006 bonus EP) ==
=== Track listing ===
All songs written by Joel Plaskett.

1. "A Million Dollars"
2. "Nowhere with You"
3. "Make a Little Noise"

=== Personnel ===
Joel Plaskett Emergency:

- Joel Plaskett: vocals and guitar
- Dave Marsh: drums and vocals
- Ian McGettigan: bass and vocals

=== Production ===
- Produced by Gordie Johnson
- Arranged by Gordie Johnson and The Joel Plaskett Emergency
