= The Park Avenue Sobriety Test =

Studio album by Joel Plaskett
- Released: March 17, 2015
- Genre: Indie rock
- Length: 42:32
- Label: Pheromone Recordings

Joel Plaskett chronology
Scrappy Happiness (2012)	The Park Avenue Sobriety Test (2015)	Solidarity (2017)

The Park Avenue Sobriety Test is an album by Canadian singer-songwriter Joel Plaskett, released March 17, 2015 on Pheromone Recordings.

The album's title derives from a nickname that Plaskett's former neighbour Roy Logan gave to a metal guardrail at the corner of Park Avenue and King Street in Dartmouth, Nova Scotia; while the curve is not geometrically unusual and can be easily navigated by a conscientious driver, there have been several instances of impaired drivers mishandling the turn and smashing their cars into the guardrail. The title also forms an acronym for the word "past", mirroring the album's primary themes of Plaskett examining his life as he approached his 40th birthday in April 2015.

Guest musicians on the album include Mo Kenney, Peter Elkas, J. P. Cormier, and Plaskett's former Thrush Hermit bandmate Ian McGettigan, as well as his regular backing band The Emergency.

== Critical reception ==
Professional ratings
Review scores
Source	Rating
Exclaim!	8/10

Writing for Exclaim!, Sarah Greene praised Plaskett for "exploring his more serious side, stretching out into corners of his musical landscape that were only hinted at on previous records, even if he played some of this stuff live."

The album was a longlisted nominee for the 2015 Polaris Music Prize, and for the Juno Award for Adult Alternative Album of the Year at the Juno Awards of 2016.

== Track listing ==
All tracks are written by Joel Plaskett, except as noted.

No.	Title	Writer(s)	Length
1.	"Illegitimate Blues"		0:56
2.	"On a Dime"		4:04
3.	"Alright/OK"		3:08
4.	"The Last Phone Booth"		0:32
5.	"When I Close My Eyes"		4:09
6.	"Credits Roll"		2:56
7.	"Captains of Industry"		5:05
8.	"For Your Consideration"		4:38
9.	"Hard Times"	Stephen Foster	3:25
10.	"Broke"		3:17
11.	"Song for Jersey"		2:45
12.	"Broken Heart Songs"		3:14
13.	"The Park Avenue Sobriety Test"		4:23
