= Wall of Fire (album) =

Studio album by Peter Elkas
- Released: 20 March 2007
- Recorded: July 2006; Monumental Sound, Toronto; Charlie's House, Austin, Texas
- Genre: Indie rock
- Label: MapleMusic Recordings
- Producer: Charlie Sexton

Peter Elkas chronology
Party of One (2003)	Wall of Fire (2007)	Repeat Offender (2011)

Wall of Fire is the second solo album by Canadian singer-songwriter Peter Elkas, produced by former Bob Dylan collaborator Charlie Sexton. It was released 20 March 2007 on MapleMusic Recordings.

Ron Sexsmith sings harmony vocals on the track "Willpower".

== Track listing ==
1. "Fall Apart Again"
2. "Willpower"
3. "Paid Back"
4. "Sweet Nancy"
5. "Wall of Fire"
6. "Darling See"
7. "Something Beaming"
8. "My Well Runs Deeper"
9. "Sunlight"
10. "See It with Me"
