= Ashtray Rock =

Studio album by Joel Plaskett Emergency
- Released: April 17, 2007
- Recorded: Phase One Studios, Toronto; November–December 2006
- Genre: Indie rock
- Label: MapleMusic Recordings
- Producer: Gordie Johnson

Joel Plaskett Emergency chronology
Make a Little Noise (2006)	Ashtray Rock (2007)	Three (2009)

Professional ratings
Review scores
Source	Rating
Allmusic	4/5 stars
Eye Weekly	4/5 stars

Ashtray Rock is an album by Canadian indie rock band Joel Plaskett Emergency, released on April 17, 2007.

In interviews, band frontman Joel Plaskett has noted that Ashtray Rock is not a genre of music, but an actual location—in the forest west of Clayton Park, Nova Scotia—where teenagers go to get drunk. The album is a concept album about two friends growing up in Halifax, Nova Scotia, who form a band together, fall for the same girl, and have a falling-out in their friendship.

Places are never as romantic as you remember them. But to me the beauty of that is trying to romanticize an unromantic place.

I mean, Ashtray Rock was a big rock in the middle of the woods. Everybody has an equivalent of some place they would meet on a Friday night. It's not like it was that exceptional a place—it wasn't. The only thing that makes it exceptional is that I had friends to meet and memories to form.

— Plaskett

Plaskett intended a nostalgic feel to the album, and used songs from his days with the band Thrush Hermit: "Snowed In" was performed live by that band, "The Glorious Life" is from 1994, and the title track Plaskett wrote in 1992 when he was age 17.

The album is Plaskett's most personal. He has suggested that his former Thrush Hermit bandmates will recognize themselves in some of the narrative, and that one of the main character's musical tastes are similar to those of his wife, Nova Scotia graphic artist and cartoonist Rebecca Kraatz, who designed the album cover art.

"Snowed In" and "Fashionable People" have both been released as singles in Canada.

On July 10, 2007, the shortlist for the Polaris Music Prize was revealed. Ashtray Rock was announced as a finalist, alongside such other acts as Arcade Fire, The Besnard Lakes, and Feist. Patrick Watson was, however, announced the winner on September 24, 2007.

The track "Introduction" consists of a small part of the track "Soundtrack for the Night."

== Track listing ==
All songs written by Joel Plaskett

1. "An Introduction" – 0:51
2. "Drunk Teenagers" – 4:10
3. "Ashtray Rock" – 0:50
4. "Fashionable People" – 4:10
5. "Penny for Your Thoughts" – 3:47
6. "Snowed In/Cruisin'" – 6:27
7. "Face of the Earth" – 4:09
8. "The Glorious Life" – 2:16
9. "Nothing More to Say" – 3:23
10. "Chinatown/For the Record" – 2:48
11. "The Instrumental" – 3:21
12. "Soundtrack for the Night" – 4:57
13. "Outroduction" (hidden track)– 1:06

== Personnel ==
- Joel Plaskett – guitars, piano, vocals
- Dave Marsh – drums, percussion, backing vocals
- Chris Pennell – bass guitar, backing vocals

=== Guests ===
- Ian McLagan – piano on tracks 3, 5, 9
- Mr. Chill – harmonica, saxophone
- Gordie Johnson – synthesizers, piano, lap steel, string arrangements
- Two Hours Traffic and "Meligrove Mike" – gang vocals on tracks 2, 12
- Rebecca Kraatz – monologue on track 11
- Andrea Lucarelli – castanets on track 12
