= The Berkeley Sessions =

Canadian television music program

- Begins: 10 September 2008
- Ends: 2009
- Location: Toronto

The Berkeley Sessions is a six-episode HD Canadian television music program produced by Original Spin Media and was broadcast on Bravo! from 2008 to 2009. The Berkeley Sessions was initially created with an eye and ear toward original music, featuring artists that create innovative new sounds in everything from alt-country and blues to jazz, pop, folk and rock n' roll.

The series was taped in front of a live audience at The Berkeley Church in Toronto, Ontario.

== Season 1 ==
- Joel Plaskett
- Sarah Slean
- Jon Langford
- Kaki King
- Pete Elkas
- Jim White
