= Make a Little Noise =

Live album by Joel Plaskett Emergency
- Released: March 14, 2006
- Recorded: Across Canada
- Genre: Rock
- Length: 101:14 (DVD); 10:00 (CD)
- Label: MapleMusic
- Producer: Mike Leblanc; Joel Plaskett; Ian McGettigan

Joel Plaskett Emergency chronology
La De Da (2005)	Make a Little Noise (2006)	Ashtray Rock (2007)

Make a Little Noise is a 2006 CD and DVD release from Halifax, Nova Scotia indie rock group Joel Plaskett Emergency. The DVD features live songs from a show at the Marquee Club in Halifax and from shows on Plaskett's solo tour. The DVD also compiles all ten of his music videos together for the first time. Released alongside the DVD are three new songs on a separate CD; one of those songs, "Nowhere with You", is Plaskett's most commercially successful solo hit.

Make a Little Noise won DVD of the Year at the 2007 East Coast Music Awards. In addition, "Nowhere With You" was named Single of the Year, and Joel Plaskett won Songwriter of the Year for that song.

== DVD listing ==
=== Emergency at the Marquee ===
- "Come On, Teacher"
- "Oh My Soul"
- "Cry Together"
- "True Patriot Love"
- "Down at the Khyber"
- "Written All Over Me"
- "Waiting to Be Discovered"
- "Extraordinary"

=== Alone & Together ===
- "Before You Leave"
- "Happen Now"
- "Light of the Moon"
- "When I Have My Vision"
- "Lonely Love"
- "Absentminded Melody"

=== Music videos ===
- "Natural Disaster"
- "Happen Now"
- "Work Out Fine"
- "Come On, Teacher"
- "True Patriot Love"
- "Clueless Wonder"
- "Maybe We Should Just Go Home"
- "News of Your Son"
- "She Made a Wreck Outta Me"
- "Paralyzed"

Total Play Time: 101:14

== CD listing ==
1. "A Million Dollars"
2. "Nowhere With You"
3. "Make a Little Noise"

Total Play Time: 10:00

== Certifications ==
Region	Certification
Canada (Music Canada)	Gold
