= Charlotte Cornfield =

Canadian singer-songwriter (born 1988)

- Born: October 14, 1988 (age 38)
- Genres: Folk, folk rock
- Instruments: Vocals, guitar, bass guitar, drums
- Website: charlottecornfield.com

Charlotte Cornfield (born October 14, 1988) is a Canadian singer-songwriter. She has released six albums: Two Horses (2011), Future Snowbird (2016), The Shape of Your Name (2019), Highs in the Minuses (2021), Could Have Done Anything (2023), and Hurts Like Hell (2026)

== Early life ==
Cornfield was born in Toronto, Ontario to an Israeli Jewish father, a classical musician and radio producer, and a mother from Toronto who was a writer and editor, and grew up in Ossington and Davenport, Toronto. She wrote songs and played piano, drums and French horn as a child, and was in several bands as a teenager. She began to pursue music as a solo artist after moving to Montreal, Quebec, where she studied jazz drumming at Concordia University, in 2006.

== Career ==
Cornfield remained in Montreal for around six years, and later lived in Brooklyn, New York City, for two years. While living in Montreal she began performing music live. As of 2010, Cornfield also played drums in the band Bent by Elephants and the jazz quartet Takk. As of 2017, her touring band comprises Bramwell Park, Craig Schram, and Stephen Tchir of The Provincial Archive. As of 2021, Cornfield is based in Toronto.

Her music has been compared to the work of The Band, Courtney Barnett, Big Thief, Bob Dylan, Jason Molina, Randy Newman, Angel Olsen, Elliott Smith, Sharon Van Etten, Townes Van Zandt, and Neil Young. She has named David Bowie, Karen Dalton, Stephin Merritt, Joni Mitchell, Lou Reed, Arthur Russell, Elliott Smith, Van Etten, Elyse Weinberg, Gillian Welch, Yo La Tengo and Young as influences. In a 2023 interview, Cornfield named Lucinda Williams as the artist who had most inspired her work.

=== It's Like That Here (2008) ===
Cornfield's debut EP, It's Like That Here, was released in 2008.

=== Collage Light (2009) ===
Cornfield's EP Collage Light was released in 2009. She cites Jeff Buckley, Leonard Cohen and Joni Mitchell as influences, and has said the EP deals with themes of "people coming and going and drifting apart". Reviewing the EP in Hour, Dave Jaffer wrote that "Cornfield is destined for good-to-great things, and new EP Collage Light is a harbinger of that."

=== Two Horses (2011) ===
Cornfield's debut album Two Horses was released in October 2011. The album was recorded over a four-month period and features Cornfield on guitar, bass guitar, drums and piano as well as vocals.

The critic Bob Mersereau of the Canadian Broadcasting Corporation praised the album as "a strong collection of songwriter tunes backing by a solid rock groove", and wrote "there's a definite spark about" Cornfield.

=== Future Snowbird (2016) ===
Cornfield's second album Future Snowbird was released in March 2016 through Consonant Records. The album was recorded live at Rooster Studios in Toronto, Ontario, was produced by Don Kerr and features appearances from Tim Darcy of Ought and Johnny Spence of Tegan and Sara. Cornfield said of the album: "I think the sound of the record is more upfront than Two Horses. It's got a kind of raw quality." The album's lyrics were inspired by Cornfield's time spent living in Brooklyn, New York City. Music videos were released for "Big Volcano, Small Town" and "Time Bomb".

The writer Sean Michaels praised "Mercury", writing that "Her songwriting is ravenous. Even here, in uneasy happiness, [Cornfield] sounds like she will wolf down her life as fast as she is able. The windfalls, the crises, the concerts, the chance encounters – she'll sprint through them all, collecting burs." Michaels also named "Mercury" as one of his favourite songs of 2016. Sarah Greene, reviewing Future Snowbird for Exclaim!, wrote that Cornfield "usually opts for unlikely, slightly awkward rhymes and metaphors, her oddball lyrical choices walking the line between heartfelt and goofy but always quotable, with songs often landing in delightfully unexpected places" and concluded that "Kerr got some lovely organic performances out of Cornfield and the band, who sound like they lived in the songs a while before they recorded." Liam Prost of BeatRoute Magazine wrote that Future Snowbird was "substantially more listener friendly" than Two Horses, but argued that "her narratives just don't land nearly as hard as she proves herself capable of on her older cuts".

=== The Shape of Your Name (2019) ===
The Shape of Your Name was released on April 5, 2019, through Next Door Music, an imprint of Outside Music. The album features collaborations with Kevin Drew, Brendan Canning and Charles Spearin of Broken Social Scene, Shawn Everett and Leif Vollebekk. A music video for "Andrew" was released in January 2019.

Cornfield said of the ideas behind the album: "With this record I was really thinking about space and breath, and I feel like it came from a meditative space of reflection. My life up to that point had been a lot of push, push, push, but then of a sudden I was in my late 20s, feeling a little more settled, a little bit wistful, and I think that really informed the songwriting process. I was not afraid of going slowly, and so there are a lot of slow jams and I’m alright with that."

Reviewing The Shape of Your Name for Exclaim!, Kaitlin Ruether described Cornfield's songwriting as "biting, lucid and nourished." Ruether praised "Storm Clouds", "Andrew" and "Up the Hill" for their "electricity and emotion", and concluded "The Shape of Your Name has an elegiac quality to it: there is plenty of mourning within these songs, but there are also rays of a bright future." Writing in Pitchfork, Hannah Jocelyn noted that the album focuses "on the patience and reflection required for relationships with others", praised Cornfield's delivery and songwriting as "authentically conversational", and concluded that the album "benefits from not trying to be a masterpiece. Instead, it stays small and approachable, a reward reserved for those paying attention." The Shape of Your Name was longlisted for the 2019 Polaris Music Prize and named by Exclaim! as the fifth-best folk or country album of 2019.

=== In My Corner (2020) ===
In My Corner, a four-track EP featuring two original songs alongside covers of Lucinda Williams and Yo La Tengo, was released in March 2020.

=== Highs in the Minuses (2021) ===
Cornfield's fourth album, Highs in the Minuses, was released in October 2021. It features drummer Liam O'Neill of Suuns and Amy Millan of Broken Social Scene and Stars. Cornfield began work on the album during a residency at the Banff Centre for Arts and Creativity, which ended early due to the COVID-19 pandemic, and completed it after returning home to Montreal. A music video, inspired by Wes Anderson's film Bottle Rocket, was released for "Partner in Crime".

Reviewing the album in Exclaim!, Laura Stanley described it as an examination of "the dizzyingly sweet moments that happen even when things feel unbearably bad" and as musically "both playful and raw-sounding."

=== Could Have Done Anything (2023) ===
Could Have Done Anything is Cornfield's fifth studio album, released in May 2023. Across six days, she worked with producer Josh Kaufman at Dreamland Recording Studios in Hurley, New York. Carolyn Droke of Uproxx wrote that Cornfield's record is "touched with the feeling of safety and comfort that comes with falling in love". Dylan Barnabe of Exclaim! argued the album "weaves a rich tapestry of quotidian moments" and proposed that Cornfield could be a successor to Gordon Lightfoot's "mantle of quiet profundity". The Toronto Star's Richie Assaly described Could Have Done Anything as an expression of Cornfield's "gift for penning simple but evocative lyrics that carry listeners to a specific time or place". In Pitchfork, Peyton Thomas described the album as "an alt-folk record unmoored from place and time" and noted its brevity and the non-linear nature of its narratives.

Cornfield released the single "Audience of One", produced by Kaufman, in September 2024.

=== Hurts Like Hell (2026) ===
Cornfield's sixth album and debut for Merge Records, Hurts Like Hell, was released in March 2026. The album features Feist, Maia Friedman, Christian Lee Hutson, Núria Graham, El Kempner, Buck Meek and members of Lake Street Dive.

In Exclaim!, Dylan Barnabe described Hurts Like Hell as "one of the year's best meditations on the embryonic nature of life's firsts and lasts, and everything in between" and identified the effect of the birth of Cornfield's first child as a theme. Matt Melis of The A. V. Club characterised the album as "a collection of charming, funny, and poignant stories from a vantage point that only comes from having once been young, awkward, and, yes, hurt like hell in the process", praised Cornfield's storytelling, and proposed ageing, confusion and self-doubt as its themes. In Pitchfork, Madison Bloom noted that Hurts Like Hell's lyrics were less personal than those of Cornfield's earlier albums and praised Adam Brisbin's pedal steel guitar performance.

The album was shortlisted for the 2026 Polaris Music Prize, and its title track was shortlisted for the SOCAN Polaris Song Prize.

== Other work ==
Cornfield features on Joel Plaskett's 2020 album 44.
