= In Need of Medical Attention =

Studio album by Joel Plaskett
- Released: 1999
- Genre: Indie rock
- Length: 34:28
- Label: No Alternative

Joel Plaskett chronology
In Need of Medical Attention (1999)	Down at the Khyber (2001)

Professional ratings
Review scores
Source	Rating
Allmusic	link

In Need of Medical Attention is the debut solo album by Joel Plaskett, released in 1999 concurrently with Thrush Hermit's Clayton Park.

== Track listing ==
No.	Title	Length
1.	"The News of Your Son"	3:06
2.	"When I Have My Vision"	3:47
3.	"Forever in Debt"	3:58
4.	"Weigh It Down"	3:29
5.	"I'd Rather Be Deadly Than Dead"	3:32
6.	"She Made a Wreck Outta Me"	4:21
7.	"Powerful Lights"	4:13
8.	"Goodbye, World"	2:20
9.	"In Need of Medical Attention"	1:45
10.	"Goodbye, Doctor"	3:57
