= Down at the Khyber =

Studio album by Joel Plaskett Emergency
- Released: July 10, 2001
- Recorded: Ultramagnetic Recording; The Khyber, Halifax, Nova Scotia; October–November 2000
- Genre: Rock
- Length: 47:00
- Label: Brobdingnagian
- Producer: Joel Plaskett, Ian McGettigan

Joel Plaskett Emergency chronology
In Need of Medical Attention (1999)	Down at the Khyber (2001)	Truthfully Truthfully (2003)

Professional ratings
Review scores
Source	Rating
Allmusic	3/5 stars

Down at the Khyber is the first album that Joel Plaskett recorded with his backing band The Emergency. The title was influenced by the many days and nights spent playing and recording at The Khyber.

Down at the Khyber was named the 46th greatest Canadian album of all time by Bob Mersereau in his book The Top 100 Canadian Albums.

== Track listing ==
All songs written by Joel Plaskett except where noted.

1. "Down at the Khyber"
2. "There's Love in the Air"
3. "Maybe We Should Just Go Home"
4. "Clueless Wonder"
5. "This Is a Message"
6. "Unconditional Love"
7. "Waiting to Be Discovered"
8. "True Patriot Love"
9. "Blinding Light"
10. "It's Catchin' On"
11. "Cry Together" (Alton Ellis & Coxsone Dodd)
12. "Light of the Moon"

== Album credits ==
=== Personnel ===
- Joel Plaskett: vocals, guitars, pedal steel, mandolin, keyboards
- Tim Brennan: bass, backing vocals, piano
- Dave Marsh: drums, backing vocals, percussion, organ

With

- Ruth Minnikin: vocals on Track 9
- Ian McGettigan: acoustic guitar on Track 12, tambourine and backing vocals on Track 9
- Charles Austin: bouzouki on Track 12
- Bill Plaskett: banjo on Track 12
- Valerie Salez: backing vocals on Track 12

=== Production ===
- Produced by Joel Plaskett with Ian McGettigan
- Recorded by Ian McGettigan at Ultramagnetic Recording, Halifax, Nova Scotia (Oct/Nov 2000)
- Technical assistance by Charles Austin and Kenny Lewis
- Mastered by Brett Zilaki at Metalworks Studios, Mississauga, Ontario
