= Songs from the Gang =

Compilation album by various artists
- Released: April 11, 2025
- Genre: indie rock, folk rock

Songs from the Gang is a compilation album, released on April 11, 2025, as a tribute to Canadian singer-songwriter Joel Plaskett.

Released one week before Plaskett's 50th birthday on April 18, 2025, the album was in production for a year previously, but was not publicized, or even revealed to Plaskett himself, in advance. Its release was announced only when Plaskett arrived at Ditch Records in Victoria, British Columbia, to meet his manager Sheri Jones for what he had been told was a simple dinner meeting, only to instead be presented with the album and taken into a private listening session.

According to Brendan Morley of Taz Records in Plaskett's hometown of Dartmouth, Nova Scotia, "Geez, they could’ve filled 50 records with artists he’s made friends with and helped their careers."

== Track listing ==
No.	Title	Artist	Length
1.	"You're Mine"	Frank Turner
2.	"Come On, Teacher"	Arkells
3.	"I Love This Town"	Sloan
4.	"Down at the Khyber"	The Sheepdogs
5.	"Drunk Teenagers"	45 Portland Street Band (Eric Stephen Martin, Alexander Gallant, Aquakultre, Sarah Swire)
6.	"Lying on a Beach"	Jenn Grant
7.	"Hey Moon (A Campfire Song)"	Alan Doyle
8.	"Happen Now"	David Myles
9.	"Harbour Boys"	Jah'Mila
10.	"Wishful Thinking"	Reeny Smith, Haliey Smith, Micah Smith
11.	"Natural Disaster"	Matt Andersen
12.	"Compete with Loneliness"	Julian Taylor
13.	"Deny, Deny, Deny"	Two Hours Traffic
14.	"Beyond, Beyond, Beyond"	Peter Elkas
15.	"Please Don't Return"	Bahamas
16.	"Lonely Love"	Mo Kenney
17.	"Nowhere with You"	Alan Syliboy and the Thundermakers
18.	"All the Way Down the Line"	City and Colour
19.	"Nothing More to Say"	Rose Cousins
20.	"Face of the Earth"	Shotgun Jimmie
21.	"Light of the Moon"	Jill Barber, Matthew Barber
22.	"Absentminded Melody"	Steve Poltz
23.	"Old Friends"	Erin Costelo
