= Scrappy Happiness =

Studio album by Joel Plaskett Emergency
- Released: March 27, 2012
- Recorded: January–March, 2012
- Genre: Indie rock
- Label: MapleMusic Recordings
- Producer: Joel Plaskett

Joel Plaskett Emergency chronology
EMERGENCYs, false alarms, shipwrecks, castaways, fragile creatures, special features, demons and demonstrations (2011)	Scrappy Happiness (2012)	The Park Avenue Sobriety Test (2015)

Scrappy Happiness is an album by Joel Plaskett Emergency released on March 27, 2012. The album followed a unique release strategy, in which the band recorded one song each week for ten weeks, immediately releasing it for airplay on CBC Radio 2 and CBC Radio 3 and to iTunes for sale as a single, before releasing the 10 songs as a complete album in conventional formats on March 27.

== Tour ==
Following the album's full release, Plaskett toured to support the album with supporting act Frank Turner.

The album was named as a longlisted nominee for the 2012 Polaris Music Prize on June 14, 2012.

== Commercial performance ==
The album debuted at number 52 on the Canadian Albums Chart.

== Track listing ==
In order of release:

1. "You're Mine" - 3:59
2. "Harbour Boys" - 3:26
3. "Old Friends" - 4:08
4. "Slow Dance" - 3:49
5. "North Star" - 4:54
6. "Somewhere Else" - 2:27
7. "I'm Yours" - 3:33
8. "Tough Love" - 3:42
9. "Time Flies" - 3:50
10. "Lightning Bolt" - 6:34

As sequenced on record:

1. "Lightning Bolt" - 6:34
2. "Harbour Boys" - 3:26
3. "You're Mine" - 3:59
4. "Tough Love" - 3:42
5. "Slow Dance" - 3:49
6. "Time Flies" - 3:50
7. "Somewhere Else" - 2:27
8. "Old Friends" - 4:08
9. "I'm Yours" - 3:33
10. "North Star" - 4:54
