= Joel Plaskett =

Canadian singer-songwriter (born 1975)

Joel Plaskett ONS
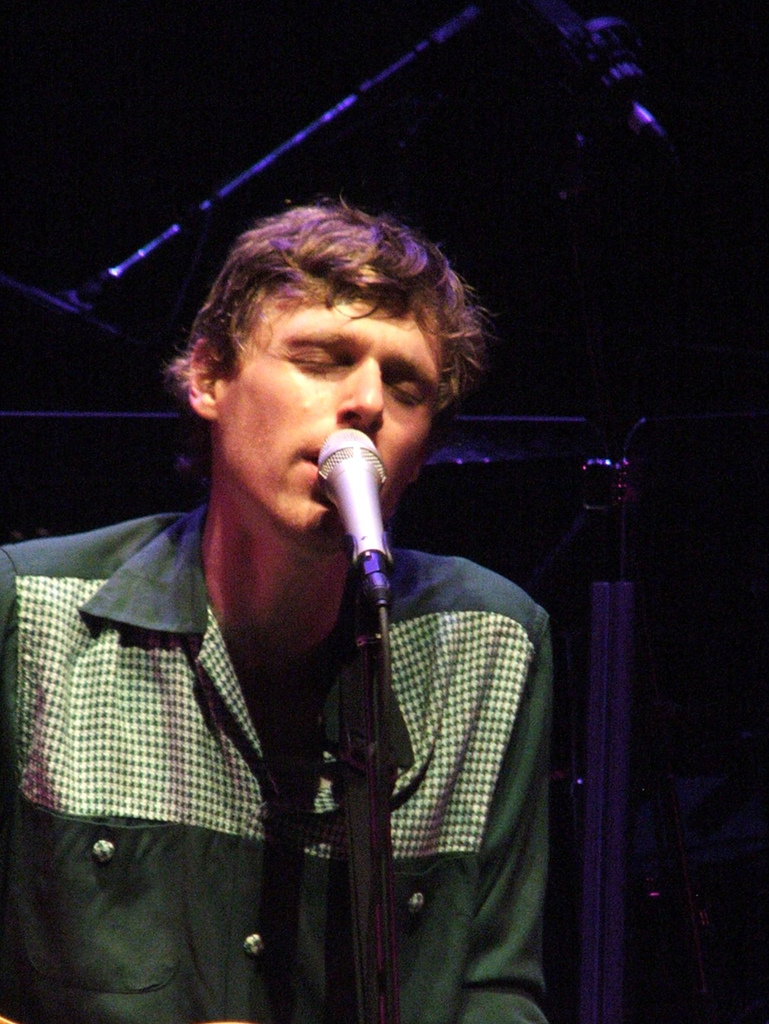
- Plaskett performing live in 2007

Background information
- Also known as: Joel Plaskett
- Born: William Joel MacDonald Plaskett; April 18, 1975 (age 51); Berwick, Nova Scotia, Canada
- Origin: Halifax, Nova Scotia, Canada
- Genres: Indie rock, Folk rock
- Occupations: Musician, songwriter, record producer
- Instruments: Vocals, guitars, bass guitar, drums, mandolin, keyboards
- Years active: 1992–present
- Labels: MapleMusic Recordings, New Scotland Records, Pheremone, turtlemusik
- Formerly of: Thrush Hermit
- Website: joelplaskett.com

William Joel MacDonald Plaskett ONS (born April 18, 1975) is a Canadian rock musician and songwriter based in Halifax, Nova Scotia. He was a member of Halifax alternative rock band Thrush Hermit in the 1990s. Plaskett performs in a number of genres, from Americana and folk to hard rock, roots, and pop.

Plaskett's songwriting frequently contains allusions to his home city, Halifax. With his band The Emergency, he has toured throughout North America and Europe with The Tragically Hip, Sloan, Bill Plaskett (his father), and Kathleen Edwards.

== Early life ==
Plaskett grew up in Lunenburg, a small town on Nova Scotia's South Shore. His father, Bill Plaskett, is also a musician, and was a cofounder of the Lunenburg Folk Harbour Festival. Plaskett learned to play guitar and write songs while listening to an eclectic range of music, from singer-songwriters such as Joni Mitchell and Neil Young to rockers such as the Sex Pistols and the Pixies.

Plaskett's family moved to Halifax when he was twelve; by the next year, he had formed his first band with friends Rob Benvie and Ian McGettigan. Initially, they called themselves Nabisco Fonzie. By 1992, they were a foursome called Thrush Hermit, with Michael Catano on drums.

== Career ==
=== Thrush Hermit ===
Plaskett was the lead singer and guitarist for the Halifax-based band Thrush Hermit. Catano was replaced by drummer Cliff Gibb in 1994, the same year the band was signed to Murderecords. After two EPs, the group went on to release its full-length debut on Elektra in 1997–Sweet Homewrecker, which was recorded in Memphis with producer Doug Easley. The album did not do well commercially, and they were dropped by their label. The band would record one more album, Clayton Park, for Sonic Unyon Records, before quitting in 1999.

=== Neuseiland ===
Neuseiland was formed in 1998 out of the remains of many other Halifax, Nova Scotia bands (including The Super Friendz, Coyote, the Euphonic, and Thrush Hermit). Taking the name of the band from a Dutch children's book by Annie Schmidt called The Island of Nose, the band consisted of Plaskett on drums, Charles Austin and Drew Yamada on guitar, Andrew Glencross on keyboard and Tim Stewart on bass. They cited King Tubby, Kraftwerk, Pink Floyd, Ray's Chicken Pita and Willie Nelson as influences. The goal of the band was to mix conventional song structure with experimentation inspired by krautrock, stoogian protoplasm and the subtractive mixing techniques of "version" reggae. The band released one album, the self-titled Neuseiland, recorded and released on March 4, 2000. The band released an extended play, The Disappearing E.P., on December 8, 2001. Sessions for a third release, titled Ai Yi Yi, were recorded in 2002, but never materialized in an official release until 2014. The band broke up after performing a farewell show on January 6, 2005.

In August 2014, the band released a digital-only compilation collection titled Rarae Aves, which included outtakes, CBC RadioSonic performances, and select demos from recording sessions dating back to 2002, on Bandcamp. Included in this collection were photographs and a near-complete video of their final show in 2005.

On August 3, 2017, the band's bassist Tim Stewart died.

=== Solo work and the Emergency ===
While still performing with Thrush Hermit, Plaskett began writing material for his first solo album. He released In Need of Medical Attention shortly after the band's breakup. It was well received by critics, but not until the release of 2001's Down at the Khyber did Plaskett begin to enjoy more widespread acclaim. Khyber was a harder-rocking album that featured a new backing band, The Emergency, consisting of Plaskett, drummer Dave Marsh and bass player Tim Brennan. Together they called themselves Joel Plaskett Emergency. The album earned Plaskett a Juno Award nomination as best new artist.

The band's next album, Truthfully Truthfully, in 2003, was Plaskett's first all-out commercial success. It was produced with his old Thrush Hermit bandmate McGettigan and was the band's debut release for MapleMusic Recordings. The album featured the song "Come On, teacher," which became a hit in Canada. The album later received an East Coast Music Award as best rock recording.

Plaskett's follow-up album was a solo effort, called La De Da, on which he played most of the instruments himself (McGettigan, however, played bass). Plaskett consciously sought a different sound for La De Da than he did for his previous effort; he considered it a record more for himself than for commercial radio. It was recorded at Flying Blanket Recording in Mesa, Arizona with Bob Hoag. The album was released in 2005 and earned two East Coast Music Awards in 2006, as Male Artist of the Year and Songwriter of the Year, for the song "Happen Now." He was also nominated for a Juno Award for songwriter of the year that year and was named male artist of the year and songwriter of the year at the East Coast Music Awards.

In March 2006, Joel Plaskett Emergency released their first DVD, Make a Little Noise. It was produced by Gordie Johnson of Big Sugar and featured Ian McLagan on keyboards. It included an EP of three songs. The single "Nowhere with You" has received the most mainstream radio airplay of any Plaskett release to date, and was featured in a Zellers television commercial. Make a Little Noise had three wins at the 2007 East Coast Music Awards: DVD of the year, single of the year ("Nowhere with You"), and songwriter of the year (Joel Plaskett, for "Nowhere with You").

The band's next album was Ashtray Rock, released in April 2007. It was produced by Gordie Johnson and featured Ian McLagan on keyboards. A concept album about high school love and suffering Ashtray Rock was on the shortlist for the 2007 Polaris Music Prize, but lost to Patrick Watson's album Close to Paradise. The album's single "Fashionable People" was nominated for the 8th Annual Independent Music Awards for pop/rock song of the year.

During the week of December 10, 2007, Plaskett and the Emergency played six consecutive shows at the Horseshoe Tavern in Toronto as part of the music venue's 60th-anniversary celebrations. Each night, a different album was performed in its entirety, starting with In Need of Medical Attention on Monday and finishing with Ashtray Rock on Friday night and Saturday night.

Emergency was nominated for seven East Coast Music Awards in 2008, more than any other act. They won six of those awards, tied with the previous record.

Another solo album came next: the album Three, which was released on March 24, 2009. It consists of three discs each consisting of nine songs for a total of 27 songs. The first single from the album was "Through and Through and Through." The triple album was nominated for the 2009 Polaris Music Prize short list. In the same week that the Polaris shortlist was announced, Paul McCartney announced that he had selected Plaskett and the band Wintersleep as the opening acts for his concert of July 11 at Halifax Common. Three won adult alternative album of the year at the 2010 Junos; Plaskett was also nominated for songwriter of the year. On the Three tour, Plaskett headlined Toronto's Massey Hall for the first time.

In May 2011, he became the first artist ever to reach one million plays on CBC Radio 3's online music streaming site, and released an exclusive acoustic version of "Nowhere with You" to the network for the occasion. In June, he released a B-sides and rarities compilation titled EMERGENCYs, false alarms, shipwrecks, castaways, fragile creatures, special features, demons and demonstrations.

The band returned for the 2012 Joel Plaskett Emergency album Scrappy Happiness, released in March. The album followed a unique release strategy, in which Plaskett and his band recorded one song each week for ten weeks, releasing each song to iTunes for sale as a single as soon as its recording and production were completed, and then rereleased the songs as a complete album once the project was concluded.

His album The Park Avenue Sobriety Test was released in March 2015. He released the album Solidarity, a collaboration with his father Bill, in 2017.

A "spiritual successor" to his album Three, Plaskett released the quadruple album 44 on April 17, 2020, the last day he was 44 years old. Plaskett recorded the 44-song collection across Dartmouth, Nova Scotia, Memphis, Nashville and Toronto, having worked with 33 other musicians over four years. Each of the four records in the album contains 11 songs, with their own title and theme. The first record (41: Carried Away) is centred around travelling, the second collection (42: Just Passing Through) turns to finding a homecoming unfamiliar, the third set (43: If There's Another Road) tackles transitioning from lost to found, and the last record (44: The Window Inn) deals with arriving at a personal destination.

Plaskett's eleventh album, One Real Reveal, was announced in May 2024, and released on September 13, 2024.

In April 2025, to mark Plaskett's 50th birthday, his management team revealed that it had commissioned Songs from the Gang, a tribute album featuring Canadian musicians recording covers of Plaskett's songs which was not revealed to Plaskett in advance of its release. Artists featured on the album include Sloan, Jenn Grant, Two Hours Traffic, The Arkells, City and Colour, Bahamas, and Frank Turner.

=== Other collaborations ===
In recent years, Plaskett has embarked upon a number of projects. He has acted as record producer for a variety of Canadian artists, including Steve Poltz, David Myles, Mo Kenney, Sarah Slean, and Meredith Shaw. As well, in 2004 he made his television debut as a rock coach on the CBC Television documentary series Rock Camp. In 2008, Plaskett and his father Bill were featured in an episode of the Bravo! television concert series The Berkeley Sessions.

Plaskett also appeared as a busker in the film One Week and was a guest anchor on the March 5, 2013 episode of This Hour Has 22 Minutes. A collaboration with CBC Kids in 2012 resulted in a music video for an alternate rendition of Plaskett's "Fashionable People", recast from the original song's satirical portrait of hipsters into a song about how fun it is to play dress-up. Fellow East Coast Canadian musician Classified (Luke Boyd) featured Plaskett on his single "One Track Mind" from his 2009 release, Self Explanatory.

In 2013, Plaskett opened New Scotland Yard (now Fang Recording) at 45 Portland Street; the location is also home to Morley's Coffee, Taz Records, and Friction Books.

Plaskett and Chris Murphy collaborated on the production of Prize for Writing, a posthumous album by singer-songwriter Matthew Grimson which was recorded in 1995 but was not commercially released until 2020.

== Discography ==
=== Thrush Hermit ===
- 1994: Smart Bomb, EP
- 1995: The Great Pacific Ocean, EP
- 1997: Rock and Roll Detective, EP
- 1997: Sweet Homewrecker
- 1999: Clayton Park

=== Neuseiland ===
- 1999: Neuseiland

=== Solo albums ===
- 1999: In Need of Medical Attention
- 2005: La De Da
- 2009: Three
- 2009: Three More (EP)
- 2010: Three to One (UK)
- 2015: The Park Avenue Sobriety Test
- 2017: Solidarity (with Bill Plaskett)
- 2020: 44
- 2022: The Window Inn Sessions
- 2024: One Real Reveal

=== Emergency ===
- 2001: Down at the Khyber
- 2003: Truthfully Truthfully
- 2006: Make a Little Noise (DVD/EP)
- 2007: Ashtray Rock
- 2011: EMERGENCYs, false alarms, shipwrecks, castaways, fragile creatures, special features, demons and demonstrations
- 2012: Scrappy Happiness
- 2021: Twenty Years Gone: The Joel Plaskett Emergency Revisits Down at the Khyber

=== Singles ===
Year	Song	Chart peak				Album
Year	Song	CAN All	CAN Alt	CAN Rock	CAN Hot AC	Album
2006	"Nowhere with You"	25			6	Make a Little Noise
2011	"Jimmie's Still Jimmie"		26	25		Jimmie's Still Jimmie / That's Not Joel (with Shotgun Jimmie)
2012	"Transit Strike"		—	48		Non-album single
2012	"You're Mine"		38	40		Scrappy Happiness
2020	"Frontlines of the Hard Times"					Non-album single
2023	"Hey Moon (A Campfire Song)"					Non-album single
"—" denotes a release that did not chart.

== Producer credits ==
- Paper Chains (LP) - Eric Stephen Martin (2024)
- Harvest Haywire (CD) - Jimmy Rankin (2023)
- Sister Swire (Digital Album) - Sister Swire (2023)
- Community Garden (LP) - Benj Rowland (2022)
- Cruisin' and Swingin' With the Moneygoround (CD) - The Moneygoround (2021)
- Back to the Harbour (CD/LP) - Alan Doyle (2022)
- Covers (CD) - Mo Kenney (2021)
- Moving East (CD/LP) Jimmy Rankin (2018)
- Through the Long Night (Digital EP) Bend The River (2018)
- Things Change (CD/LP) Dennis Ellsworth (2018)
- The Details (CD/LP) Mo Kenney (2017)
- Field of Trampolines (CD/LP) Shotgun Jimmie (2016)
- Hymn After Hymn (EP) Villages (2016)
- "Birthday" (single) The Brood (2015)
- You Know I Love You (CD) Sean McCann (2015)
- In My Dreams (CD/LP) Mo Kenney (2014) 2016 JUNO Award Nominee
- The Old Silo (CD/LP) James Hill 2015 JUNO Award Nominee
- "A Game Goin' On" (single) Dave Gunning (2014)
- I Never Sang Before I Met You (EP) Old Man Luedecke (2014)
- Help Yourself (CD) Sean McCann (2014)
- "Lead Me On" (single) Direction (CD) Colleen Brown (2013)
- "Soap and Denim" (single) Direction (CD) Colleen Brown (2013)
- "Randy Newman" (single) Direction (CD) Colleen Brown (2013)
- "Let You Down Again" (single) Gloryhound (2013)
- Trouble (EP) Meredith Shaw (2013)
- Mo Kenney (CD) Mo Kenney (2012)
- Land (of Land & Sea) (CD/LP) Sarah Slean (2011)
- Turn Time Off (CD) David Myles (2011)
- Dreamhouse (CD/LP) Steve Poltz (2010)
- The True Love Rules (CD) Dave Marsh (2010)
- Territory (CD) Two Hours Traffic (2009)
- Little Jabs (CD) Two Hours Traffic (2007) Polaris Music Prize Short-list
- Two Hours Traffic (CD) Two Hours Traffic (2006)

== Self-produced ==
- One Real Reveal (2024)
- The Window Inn Sessions (2022)
- 44 Joel Plaskett (2020)
- Solidarity Bill Plaskett & Joel Plaskett (2017)
- The Park Avenue Sobriety Test Joel Plaskett (2015) 2016 JUNO Nominee
- Scrappy Happiness Joel Plaskett (2012)
- Three Joel Plaskett (2009)
- La De Da Joel Plaskett (2005)
- Truthfully, Truthfully Joel Plaskett (2003)
- Down at The Khyber Joel Plaskett (2001)
- In Need Of Medical Attention Joel Plaskett (1999)

== Vinyl singles produced ==
- “Eden” b/w “The Great Escape” Mo Kenney
- “When You Come Around” b/w “Paper Crowns” Joel Plaskett Jeremy Fisher
- “Jimmie's Still Jimmie” b/w “That's Not Joel” Joel Plaskett Shotgun Jimmie
- “Destructive” b/w “High Road” Ben Gunning
- “Police Cops”, “Ayatollah” b/w “Boom! Boom!” Myles Deck & The Fuzz
- “Out of Love” b/w “Wrong So Wrong” David Myles
- “Matthew Doesn't Live Here Anymore” b/w “For A Song” Matthew Grimson
- "Three More" Joel Plaskett
- “Half Lit Through the Leaves” b/w “The Scotsman” Tyler Messick
- “Storm Comin'” b/w “Farmer's Daughter” Ana Egge
- “Becoming a Silhouette” b/w “Holding Ghosts” Yellow Jacket Avenger
- “Poor Young Things” b/w “Repeat Offender” Peter Elkas

== Awards and achievements ==
- 2026
  - ECMA Award Nominee Folk Album of the Year
- 2025
  - Order of Nova Scotia
  - Portia White Award
- 2024
  - The Coast voted "Best Songwriter" (Gold)
  - The Coast voted "Best Folk Artist" (Gold)
- 2021
  - MNS Award Winner Solo Recording of the Year - 44
  - MNS Award Nominee Songwriter of the Year
  - ECMA Award Nominee Songwriter of the Year
  - ECMA Award Nominee Album of the Year - 44
- 2018
  - The Coast voted "Best Songwriter"
  - The Coast voted "Best Solo Artist"
  - The Coast voted "Best Producer"
  - ECMA Winner Songwriter of the Year – Joel Plaskett
  - ECMA Nomination Album of the Year – Bill & Joel Plaskett, Solidarity
  - ECMA Nomination Folk Recording of the Year – Bill & Joel Plaskett, Solidarity
  - ECMA Nomination Fans’ Choice Entertainer of the Year
- 2017
  - Music Nova Scotia Award Winner Folk Recording of the Year – Bill & Joel Plaskett, Solidarity
- 2016
  - The Coast voted "Best Songwriter"
  - The Coast voted "Best Producer"
  - The Coast voted "Best Male Solo Artist"
  - JUNO Award Nomination Adult Alternative Album of the Year – The Park Avenue Sobriety Test
  - ECMA Award Winner Producer of the Year
  - ECMA Award Nomination Fans’ Choice Entertainer of the Year
- 2015
  - CBC's "50 Best Canadian Albums of 2015" – The Park Avenue Sobriety Test
  - Dave Hodge's Annual Best of Albums 2015 – The Park Avenue Sobriety Test (#3)
  - CBC Music's Top Songs of 2015 – "The Park Avenue Sobriety Test"
  - Music Nova Scotia Award Winner Entertainer of the Year
  - Music Nova Scotia Award Winner Producer of the Year
  - The Coast voted "Best Songwriter"
  - The Coast voted "Best Producer"
  - The Coast voted "Best Merch By An Artist/Band"
  - Polaris Music Prize Long List Nominee – The Park Avenue Sobriety Test
  - ECMA Award Winner Producer of the Year
- 2014
  - Music Nova Scotia Award Winner Producer of the Year
- 2013
  - CBC Radio 3 Bucky Award Lifetime Achievement
  - ECMA Award Winner Rock Recording of the Year – Scrappy Happiness
  - ECMA Award Nomination Entertainer of the Year
- 2012
  - Polaris Music Prize Long List – Scrappy Happiness
  - CBC Radio 3 Bucky Award Winner for The Golden Bucky – "Lightning Bolt"
  - Music Nova Scotia Award Winner SOCAN Songwriter of the Year – "You're Mine"
  - Music Nova Scotia Award Nomination Entertainer of the Year
  - Queen Elizabeth II Diamond Jubilee Medal
- 2011
  - The Coast voted "Best Songwriter"
- 2010
  - Juno Award Winner Adult Alternative Album of the Year – Three
  - Juno Award Nomination Songwriter of the Year – "Through & Through & Through"
  - Finalist International Songwriting Contest "Through & Through & Through" Performance Category
  - CMW Indie Award Winner Favourite Solo Artist
  - CMW Indie Award Nomination Favourite Album – Three
  - ECMA Award Winner Male Solo Recording of the Year – Three
  - ECMA Award Winner Entertainer of the Year
  - ECMA Award Winner SOCAN Songwriter of the Year – "Through & Through & Through"
  - ECMA Award Winner FACTOR Recording of the Year – Three
  - ECMA Award Winner Single of the Year – "Through & Through & Through"
  - ECMA Award Winner Pop Recording of the Year – Three
  - ECMA Award Nomination Single of the Year – "You Let Me Down"
  - ECMA Award Nomination Video of the Year – "Through & Through & Through"
  - The Coast voted "Best Local Solo Male"
  - The Coast voted "Best Vinyl" – Three
  - The Coast voted "Best Local Album" – Three
- 2009
  - Polaris Music Prize Nomination – Three
  - Canadian Folk Music Award Winner Contemporary Album of the Year - Three
  - Canadian Folk Music Award Winner Producer of the Year
  - Canadian Folk Music Award Nomination Solo Artist of the Year
  - Canadian Folk Music Award Nomination Pushing The Boundaries Recording of the Year – Three
  - ECHO Songwriting Prize Nomination – "Through & Through & Through"
  - First Place Winner Great American Song Contest – "Face of the Earth"
  - ECMA Award Winner Entertainer of the Year
  - ECMA Award Nomination Single of the Year – "Face of the Earth"
  - Music Nova Scotia Award Winner Album of the Year – Three
  - Music Nova Scotia Award Winner Male Solo Artist of the Year
  - Music Nova Scotia Award Winner Pop/Rock Recording of the Year – Three
  - Music Nova Scotia Award Winner SOCAN Songwriter of the Year
  - Music Nova Scotia Award Nomination Entertainer of the Year
  - Music Nova Scotia Award Nomination Video of The Year – "Through & Through & Through"
- 2008
  - Juno Award Nomination Songwriter of the Year – Ashtray Rock
  - First Place Winner Billboard World Song Contest Pop Category – "Fashionable People"
  - First Place Winner Great American Song Contest – "Fashionable People"
  - CMW Indie Award Nomination Favourite Rock Artist/Group of the Year
  - CMW Indie Award Nomination Galaxie Rising Star
  - COCA Mainstage Artist Award
  - ECMA Award Winner Recording of the Year – Ashtray Rock
  - ECMA Award Winner Group Recording of the Year
  - ECMA Award Winner Rock Recording of the Year
  - ECMA Award Winner SOCAN Songwriter of the Year
  - ECMA Award Winner Single of the Year – "Fashionable People"
  - ECMA Award Winner Video of the Year – "Fashionable People"
  - ECMA Award Nomination Entertainer of the Year
  - The Coast voted "Best Local Solo Male"
- 2007
  - Polaris Music Prize Nomination – Ashtray Rock
  - CBC Radio 3 Bucky Award Winner "Song Most Likely to be a Future Classic"- "Nowhere With You"
  - CBC Radio 3 Bucky Award Nomination "Best Falsetto" – "Fashionable People"
  - ECMA Award Winner SOCAN Songwriter of the Year – "Nowhere With You"
  - ECMA Award Winner Single of the Year
  - ECMA Award Winner DVD of the Year – Make A Little Noise
  - Music Nova Scotia Award Winner Album of the Year – Ashtray Rock
  - Music Nova Scotia Award Winner Pop rock Recording of the Year – Ashtray Rock
  - Music Nova Scotia Award Winner Entertainer of the Year
  - Music Nova Scotia Award Winner Group of the Year
  - Music Nova Scotia Award Winner Songwriter of the Year
  - Music Nova Scotia Award Winner Video of the Year – "Fashionable People"
  - The Coast voted "Top 50 CDs of the Year Award" – Ashtray Rock
  - The Coast voted "Best Canadian Male Musician"
  - The Coast voted "Best Canadian Solo Artist"
- 2006
  - Juno Award Nomination Songwriter of the Year – La De Da
  - First Place Great American Song Contest – "Nowhere With You"
  - Verge Award Winner – Album of the Year Award
  - Chart Magazine The Golden Toque Award Nomination – Best Canadian Album
  - Canadian Radio Music Award Nomination – Best New Solo Artist Hot AC
  - CBC Radio 3 voted #1 Top 94 list – "Nowhere With You"
  - ECMA Award Winner Male Artist of the Year – La De Da
  - ECMA Award Winner Songwriter of the Year Award – "Happen Now"
  - ECMA Award Nomination Album of the Year
  - ECMA Award Winner Single of the Year
  - ECMA Award Winner Video the Year
  - Music Nova Scotia Award Winner Songwriter of the Year – "Nowhere With You"
  - Music Nova Scotia Award Winner Entertainer of the Year
  - Music Nova Scotia Award Nomination Single of the Year
  - The Coast voted "Best Canadian Male Musician"
  - The Coast voted "Best Local Male Musician"
  - The Coast voted "Best Local Album" – La De Da
- 2005
  - MIANS Award Winner Male Artist of the Year
  - MIANS Award Winner Album of the Year – La De Da
  - MIANS Award Winner Pop/Rock Recording of the Year
  - ECMA Award Winner Rock Recording of the Year
  - ECMA Award Nomination Album of the Year
  - ECMA Award Nomination Group of the Year
  - The Coast voted "Best Canadian Male Musician"
  - The Coast voted "Best Local Male Musician"
  - The Coast voted "Best Local Song"
- 2004
  - Juno Award Nomination Best Alternative Album of the Year
  - MIANS Award Winner Group of the Year – Truthfully, Truthfully
  - MIANS Award Winner Alternative Recording of the Year
  - MIANS Award Winner Entertainer of the Year
  - The Coast voted "Best Local Band"
  - The Coast voted "Best Local Album" – Truthfully, Truthfully
- 2003
  - The Coast voted "Best Local Band"
  - The Coast voted "Best Local Live Act"
- 2002
  - Juno Award Nomination Best Alternative Album of the Year – Down at The Khyber
  - ECMA Award Nomination Rock Recording of the Year
  - ECMA Award Nomination Best New Artist of the Year
  - ECMA Award Nomination Video of the Year – "Maybe We Should Just Go Home"
  - The Coast voted "Best Local Album" – Down at The Khyber
  - The Coast voted "Best Video" – "Maybe We Should Just Go Home"
  - The Coast voted "Best Male Solo Artist"

== See also ==
- Music of Canada
- Canadian rock
- List of Canadian musicians
