= Seela Misra =

American singer-songwriter

- Also known as: Seela
- Born: Seela Misra; Cornwall, Ontario, Canada
- Genres: Folk, jazz
- Occupation: Singer-songwriter
- Instruments: Guitar, bass, vocals
- Years active: 1994–present
- Label: New Improved Music
- Website: iamseela.com

Seela Misra is a Canadian-born singer-songwriter residing in Austin, Texas. She was the lead singer of the jazz band TOrcH and is also the back-up singer for Matt the Electrician. Seela is known for an expressive vocal range, "one moment she rasps like a Jersey deli queen, the next she's cooing coquettishly." This is evident in her solo work and when delivering jazz standards with the Jazz Pharaohs or with TOrcH where she has been credited with "unswerving hipness" succeeding where others have failed "in melding her own style with those from the past."

Seela's initial foray into recording, Probably Lucy (1994) conveyed "a spare sultriness," and was called "a languid acoustic romp through the varied terrain of the poetic heart," quickly selling out its first pressing. "Dark and atmospheric," her follow-up album, Something Happened (1999), received criticism for inconsistent songwriting; "the head lady has not found quite enough songs to fill 56 minutes," while simultaneously admitting "what her songwriting lacks in answers, it makes up for in mood."

Indeed, depth of mood and emotion, thus far, has defined her career and stage presence: "Her stare is direct, like Krishna contemplating Radha," while her "voice is her main calling card, soft and inviting, belying the darkness in her songs." "Sonically compelling," Seela is sought out in the Austin music scene, adding vocals to albums across a wide range of genres, while complimenting numerous artists on stage.

Seela released her fourth solo studio album, Valentine in 2013.

On Track you Down (2016) "Seela sings of spiritual faith and doubt" "by way of vibrant, earthy vocals, vivid word-pictures and melodies nurtured by multiple genres and razor-sharp pop instincts."

Seela’s sixth LP, Cool (2020) garnered praise for her "bright pop voice" and its "lo-fi bluesy tone." "She doesn’t effectively latch on to any genre with fervor. Funk? Soul? Rock? Jazz? Blues? None. She throws them all into a pot & stirs vigorously. Then opts for a tight melodic groove. It cuts to the chase, goes for the feet & heart simultaneously."

== Performed with ==
Sean Hayes, Ian McLagan, Craig Ross, Tom Freund, Stanley Smith, Freedy Johnston, Ephraim Owens, Eric Beverly, Whammo, Jon Greene.

== Discography ==
=== Solo ===
- Probably Lucy (1994)
- Something Happened (1999)
- Hard Times Hit (2003)
- Rock With Us (2004) with 4-Eyes, Live
- Valentine (2013)
- Track you Down (2016)
- Cool (2020)

=== with TOrcH ===
- Sounds for Staying Home (2002)
- Before the Night is Over (2005)
- Charmed (2007)

== See also ==
- Music of Austin
