= Jason Bajada =

Canadian singer

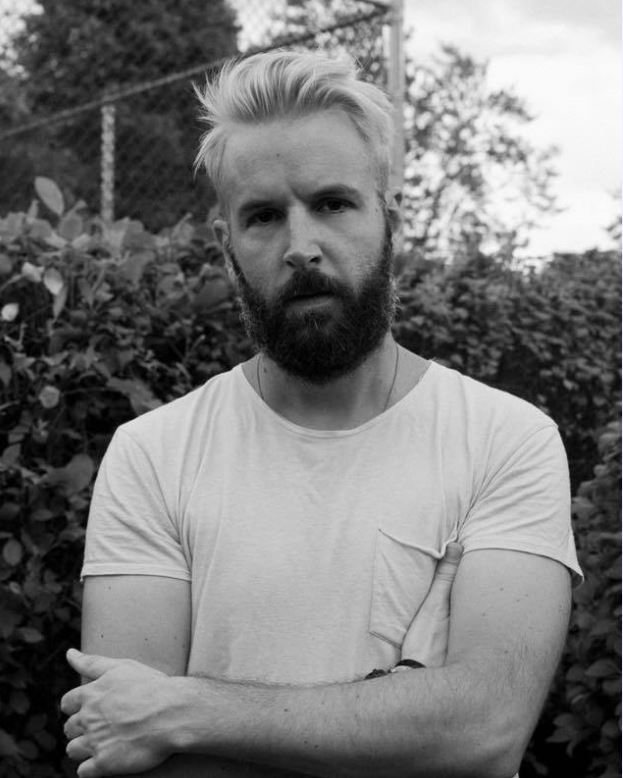

Background information
- Born: Montreal, Quebec, Canada
- Genres: Indie folk, Indie pop
- Occupations: Musician, songwriter
- Instruments: Vocals, guitar, piano
- Years active: 2005–present
- Labels: MapleMusic Recordings, Audiogram (label)
- Website: www.jasonbajada.net

Jason Bajada is a Canadian singer-songwriter from Montreal, Quebec.

Bajada released two albums, Puer Dolor in 2005 and Up Go the Arms in 2006, before signing to Maple Music Recordings/Universal, with whom he released his label debut Loveshit in 2009. He followed up in 2011 with The Sound Your Life Makes, which reached number 57 on the Canadian Albums Chart.

In addition to his English material, Bajada has released two French albums. Le résultat de mes bêtises was released in September 2013 during the Pop Montreal festival, and his follow-up, entitled Volcano, was released in February 2016. Volcano received a Prix Félix nomination for Best Adult Contemporary Album at the 38th Felix Awards.

His double album Loveshit 2 (Blondie & the Backstabberz) was released in September 2017 on Audiogram.

Crushed Grapes is Bajada's eighth studio album, and was produced by Connor Seidel. The title track was inspired by Ask The Dust, a novel by John Fante Bajada had fallen in love with while living in Los Angeles.

Bajada has toured with Martha Wainwright, The Lemonheads, Joseph Arthur, Matt Holubowski, Pilot Speed, Dumas, Robert Charlebois, David Usher, Black Diamond Bay, Arthur H, The Church and Cœur de pirate, among others.

== Discography ==
- 2005: Puer Dolor
- 2006: Up Go the Arms
- 2009: Loveshit
- 2011: The Sound Your Life Makes
- 2013: Le résultat de mes bêtises
- 2016: Volcano
- 2017: Loveshit 2 (Blondie & the Backstabberz)
- 2022: Crushed Grapes
- 2024: Ça m’manque pas d’avoir le blues
