= Ashes of Soma =

Canadian alternative rock band

- Origin: Windsor, Ontario, Canada
- Genres: Alternative rock, Rock, alternative metal, post-grunge
- Years active: 2005–present
- Labels: MapleMusic
- Members: Randy Gray; Mike Preney; Paul Doman; Joel Bishop

Ashes of Soma is a Canadian alternative rock band. Formed in the early 2000s in Windsor, Ontario, Canada.

== Members ==
- Randy Gray (vocals, acoustic guitar)
- Mike Preney (guitar)
- Brian Fry (guitar)
- Paul Doman (drums)
- Joel Bishop (bass)
- David Creed (vocals)

== Biography ==
Three Windsor high school classmates consisting of Gray, Preney, and an unnamed vocalist sought out to start a band. They found their drummer in Paul Doman and created the band Knematic. After two separate incidents forced Gray and the former vocalist to leave the band, the band was left with a void. Ashes of Soma found their bassist in between the incidents, and Gray later happily rejoined the band as the new vocalist. After a couple of years of developing their sound, they recorded their first record, Exit 674. The first single released was "Emancipate". The band is working with record producer David Bendeth (known for his work with Breaking Benjamin and Killswitch Engage) as they record their second album.

They have toured in the US and Canada with Candlebox, Default, Hinder, and Theory of a Deadman. They have also toured with Social Code, Idle Sons, Evans Blue and Thornley.

The band's influences include Tool, Sevendust, Disturbed, Finger Eleven, and I Mother Earth.

In December 2008 the band released their third single "Bedroom Walls" and it received heavy air play on Canadian rock stations as well as WRIF (Detroit) and 89X (Windsor/Detroit) in Michigan. The Ashes of Soma self-titled record was released in 2010 and featured a few re-recorded versions of songs found Exit 674.

The band premiered their fourth single "Meteor" on September 8, 2013, on the station 89X. Their EP The Singularity was released on October 4, 2013, and will be followed with a tour.

Vocalist David Creed Joins A.O.S Dec 2013. Joint vocals on The Singularity (Wolf) May 2016 (The Leash) to present.

== Albums ==
- Exit 674 (MapleMusic Recordings, 2005)
- Ashes of Soma (Set-Up Promotions, 2010)
- The Singularity (2013)
- Novel 1 (2020)
