= New Scotland Records =

Canadian record label

Fang Recording
- Founded: 2008
- Founder: Joel Plaskett
- Genre: Folk
- Country of origin: Canada
- Location: Dartmouth, Nova Scotia
- Official website: Official website

Fang Recordings (previously New Scotland Records) is a record label founded by Canadian Folk Artist Joel Plaskett in 2008 based in Dartmouth, Nova Scotia, Canada. Plaskett claims that he "started New Scotland Records to release songs recorded with friends from my musical community in Nova Scotia and abroad". They have released multiple albums on vinyl and CD and digitally for free on their Bandcamp page

== Studio ==
In addition the record label, Joel opened New Scotland Yard Studio in 2013. It features a 950 square foot room and is equipped to record artists in both digital and analog formats. Speaking on the analog format, Plaskett said "I am useless with a computer. I don't even want to touch them, But I know how to align the tape machines" Artists who have recorded at the studio include Gloryhound, The Meds, Old Man Luedecke, Mo Kenney and Roxie & The Underground Soul Sound.

== Artists ==
Artists who have released albums and singles on the label include:

- Joel Plaskett
- Mo Kenney
- Big Sugar
- Al Tuck
- Peter Elkas
- Thrush Hermit
- Steve Poltz
- Dave Marsh
- Matthew Grimson
