= Matthew Grimson =

Canadian musician (1968–2018)

- Born: March 9, 1968
- Origin: Halifax, Nova Scotia, Canada
- Died: June 19, 2018 (aged 50)
- Genres: Indie, alternative, grunge
- Occupation: Musician
- Instruments: Guitar, vocals
- Years active: 1980s-2010s
- Label: Lord Sir Skronk
- Website: http://lordsirskronk.com/bands/3 (previously)

Matthew George Grimson (March 9, 1968 – June 19, 2018) was a Canadian musician from Halifax, Nova Scotia. Although he released albums locally in small quantities and never became widely known outside of Halifax in his lifetime, he came to wider attention in 2020 with the release of the posthumous album Prize for Writing.

== Background ==
Grimson attended Dalhousie University in the 1980s, befriending Chris Murphy who would later become a prominent musician with the band Sloan. The two later decided to form a band called Dust Party, although the project never actually went any further than discussions about how they would dress on stage. A few years later, he met Joel Plaskett in a class on sound recording.

He was the nephew of Canadian politician Michael Forrestall.

== Career ==
He recorded Prize for Writing in 1995, in two recording sessions backed by Murphy, Sloan drummer Andrew Scott, Matt Murphy of The Super Friendz and guitarist Clive MacNutt, although the album was not released at that time. Cassette bootlegs of the sessions were widely circulated among his fans, but the original master tape was kept in Grimson's own personal archive of home recordings.

His album A Life Played for Keeps was released in 2002 on the independent label Lord Sir Skronk. In 2010, he released the two-song single "Matthew Doesn't Live Here Anymore" b/w "For a Song" on Plaskett's New Scotland Records.

Grimson also collaborated with Craig Leonard in the industrial music project Guilt, which independently released a self-titled album in 2012.

Matthew played in many bands in the early 2000s to around 2015 in the Halifax area, on top of the 3-piece Grimson Inc. Alewives, Deluxe and Delangro's, Gillian Austin and the Brambles, Skinned Roadie, Loaded Slogan's, Guilt and The Establishment are a few of these bands. Albums can be found by many of these bands.

Grimson described his own music as "psychological metal, verbose pop, queasy balladry, and odd trips", and his music has been commonly compared to artists such as Warren Zevon, John Cale, Roky Erickson and Randy Newman. Plaskett has described him as an artist who was "destined to ride in the fringes", with a strange musical style and a singing voice that could not always carry off the complexity of his melodic ideas, but ultimately highlighted his lifelong battle with mental health as the main reason he was never able to build a sustained career even though many musicians with styles as quirky or unusual as Grimson's have found success as cult artists.

Grimson died by suicide in 2018.

== Legacy ==
Following Grimson's death, Plaskett and Erin Costelo organized a tribute show at Gus' Pub in Halifax, featuring performances by both musicians and poets. When sorting through his possessions, Grimson's sister Kristin subsequently found the Prize for Writing tapes; Plaskett and Chris Murphy completed production work on the recordings before releasing them in 2020 as a joint release of both New Scotland Records and Sloan's Murderecords. Murphy has indicated that the labels may also reissue A Life Played for Keeps in the future; Grimson's archive of home recordings also reportedly includes at least one other full unreleased album.

In March 2024, Grimson's album Sonovabitch was released on Question Everything Records, originally released on CD-R in 2018.

Sloan covered his song "Stood Up" on their 1996 album Recorded Live at a Sloan Party. Plaskett covered "Drifters Raus" on his 2009 album Three, and recorded the original tribute song "Matthew Grimson Songs", which blended some lyrics from Grimson's songs, on his 2020 album 44.

== Discography ==
Albums

- Piss De Resistance (1993)
- Rock At Your Head (1995)
- Are You There God? It’s Me, Matthew (1998)
- Millenium (1999)
- My Demons to Your Kings (2001)
- A Life Played For Keeps (2002)
- Sonovabitch (2018)
- Prize For Writing (2020, posthumous release)

Singles and EPs

- The Arms Dealer Blues EP (1996)
- "Matthew Doesn't Live Here Anymore / For A Song" (2010)
- Something To Cheer For (2020, posthumous release)
