= Bill Plaskett =

British-Canadian folk, rock and jazz musician (born 1945/1946)

- Born: 1945/1946; London, England
- Origin: London, England
- Genres: Indie Rock, Folk Rock, Jazz
- Occupations: Musician, songwriter
- Instruments: Vocals, and Guitar
- Labels: MapleMusic Recordings, New Scotland

Bill Plaskett is a British-Canadian folk, rock, Jazz and indie rock musician, best known as a founder of the Lunenburg Folk Harbour Festival in Lunenburg, Nova Scotia.

He is the father of Canadian folk rock musician and Juno Award winner Joel Plaskett, with whom he recorded the collaborative album Solidarity in 2017. He has also been a contributing musician on some of Joel's other albums, including Three.

== Biography ==
Plaskett was born in 1945 in London, England. In the 1960s he learned how to play banjo from his father in a traditional jazz and skiffle group; Plaskett later learned how to play electric bass in his high school rock band known as Section 62. In the mid-1960s he travelled throughout the United States of America before emigrating to Vancouver, British Columbia in 1967. He lived there until moving to Lunenberg just before his son Joel was born in 1975.
