= Matt the Electrician =

American musician

- Also known as: Matt the Electrician, MTE
- Born: Matt Sever
- Origin: San Francisco, California, United States
- Genres: Indie folk, Folk-pop, Neo-folk
- Occupations: Singer-songwriter, electrician (formerly)
- Instruments: Guitar, banjo, trumpet, euphonium
- Years active: 1999–present
- Label: ChezDre
- Website: www.matttheelectrician.com

Matt the Electrician is the stage name of Matt Sever, a singer-songwriter based in Austin, Texas. Sever has released a total of 13 albums through 2024 and his work has been used in advertising, film and American radio and television programs.

== Biography ==
=== Early years ===
Matt Sever was born in San Francisco, California, and spent his formative years in northern California and southern Oregon. Sever began playing coffee houses when he was 15 years old and broke into the Austin, Texas music scene in 1996 when he began hosting an open mic night at the now defunct Flipnotics Coffeespace.

When Sever would arrive at gigs still sweaty from a long days work in Austin's summer heat, he would often explain, "Hi, my name is Matt, and I'm an electrician." Regulars to his shows began referring to him as "The Electrician," and the moniker stuck. Early press referred to Sever being "a regular blue-collar type of guy." Indeed, his third album, Made for Working, displayed his work boots on the cover and Sever frequently played up his day job early in his career.

=== Giving up the day job ===
By his fourth album, 2004's Long Way Home, Sever had given up his day job and began traveling and developing audiences outside of Texas and the west coast. Shifting away from touring with a full band he began playing house concerts and tapped into folk/songwriter circuits in such far off places as Alaska, Japan, and Denmark.

Sever's music has been described as folk-pop or neo-folk, but more generally incorporates various styles of Americana/roots-based acoustic music. From his very first album, Baseball Song in 1998, fans and critics have been drawn to "the innocence of Sever’s music," and his ability to "capture everyday feelings and situations with a naive, straightforward gracefulness."

Described as "a young Paul Simon wrapped around a Tom Waits heart," his songs are often highly autobiographical, both telling the story within the song as well elaborating during live sets. Sever is known for delivering quirky and unique covers and the ability to "hold everyone rapt like a bunch of babies in front of dangling car keys." as he fills his songs, live shows and studio albums with an "endearing parade of characters."

=== People ===
Sever performs as a solo act or as a duo, often with back-up singer Seela Misra or multi-instrumentalist Scrappy Jud Newcomb. When performing on stage or in the studio, in addition to Misra and Newcomb, Jon Green (drums) and Tom Pearson (bass) complete the band. Sever also frequently performs with what has become his trio, which consists of Seela Misra on backup vocals and auxiliary percussion and Stephanie Macias (Stage Name Little Brave) on backup vocals and ukulele.

Sever is quick to share the stage with other songwriters and regularly participates in songwriter circles and has become a favorite of other songwriters. He has opened for or shared billing with Ana Egge, Southpaw Jones, Tom Freund, The Weepies, Bob Schneider and the Asylum Street Spankers.

=== Projects ===
In addition to the production of his full length studio albums, Sever has also released a number of 45 RPM vinyl records with 2 songs on each. Between 2015 and 2017 Sever would release a new vinyl every few months for a total of 6 double sided records. Each record was recorded with a different backing band. Each backing band is based in Austin, with the exception of Paul Curreri, who is now based in Charlottesville. All 12 songs recorded during this project constitute the music on his 2017 Album The Doubles. In addition to the versions with the guest bands, The Doubles also includes all 12 songs re-recorded with Matt and his regular trio. Each album along with its backing band and track listing is listed below.

Matt The Electrician Vinyls
Backing Band	Track listing	Year released
Wood & Wire	1) The Bear 2) Never Had a Gun	2015
Dana FalconberyTrio	1) The Party 2) I Don't Have Anything To Do with My Hands	2016
Wilson Marks Trio	1) A Secret 2) I Cannot Read Your Mind	2016
Little Brave	1) Mountains 2) 20/20	2016
Paul Curreri & Devon Sproule	1) California 2) Family of Stars	2017
The Deer	1) The Clearwater 2) Live to Fight	2017

== Media ==
Sever's music has been featured in advertising, film, and multiple American television and radio programs. "I Remember" from the album Baseball Song appeared in the movie Playing Mona Lisa. The single "Valedictorian" from the album Long Way Home was featured in episodes of Eli Stone and Army Wives. "Got Your Back" from the album Animal Boy appeared first in an LL Bean commercial from Winter 2010 and more recently was used in This American Life.

== Discography ==
- Baseball Song (1998)
- Home (1999)
- Made for Working (2003)
- Songs My Mom Doesn't Like (2004) 5 song EP
- Long Way Home (2004)
- Playing Live at Café Mundi (2007) Live, with Southpaw Jones
- One Thing Right (2007)
- Animal Boy (2009)
- Matt the Electrician Is Alive (2010) Live
- Accidental Thief (2011)
- It's a Beacon It's a Bell (2013)
- The Doubles (2017)
- We Imagined An Ending (2021)
- The Ocean Knocked Me Down (2024)
- Let's Play Two (2026) 2 song EP

== See also ==
- Music of Austin
