= Solidarity (Joel Plaskett album) =

Studio album by Joel Plaskett with Bill Plaskett
- Released: February 17, 2017
- Genre: Folk rock
- Label: Pheromone Recordings

Joel Plaskett chronology
The Park Avenue Sobriety Test (2015)	Solidarity (2017)	44 (2020)

Solidarity is an album by Canadian singer-songwriter Joel Plaskett and Bill Plaskett, released February 17, 2017 on Pheromone Recordings. Bill Plaskett, Joel's father, is a folk musician and founder of the Lunenburg Folk Music Festival in Lunenburg, Nova Scotia, but has never previously recorded an album.

The title track was released online as a preview of the album in November 2016. "The Next Blue Sky" followed in January 2017 as the album's first official single.

The album was supported by a cross-Canada tour, including a date at Toronto's Massey Hall in April 2017.

== Track listing ==
No.	Title	Length
1.	"Dragonfly"
2.	"The Next Blue Sky"
3.	"We Have Fed You All for 1000 Years"
4.	"Blank Cheque"
5.	"Help Me Somebody Depression Blues"
6.	"Up in the Air"
7.	"Jim Jones"
8.	"The New California"
9.	"No Sight Compares"
10.	"Solidarity"
11.	"On Down the River"
