= Party of One (Peter Elkas album) =

Studio album by Peter Elkas
- Released: 2003
- Genre: Indie rock
- Label: MapleMusic Recordings

Peter Elkas chronology
Party of One (2003)	Wall of Fire (2007)

Party of One is an album by Peter Elkas, released in 2003.

Following of the release of his sophomore album, Wall of Fire, in 2007, Elkas said: "As much as I was happy with Party of One, it had a very limited audience. I know that this one is the second chance at a first try, you know?"

== Track listing ==
1. Party of One
2. In My Den
3. Gone, It's Gone
4. Turn Out the Lights
5. I See Fine
6. Skipping Stone
7. Build a Harmony
8. Everybody Works
9. Only You
10. Still a Flame
