= Three (Joel Plaskett album) =

Studio album by Joel Plaskett
- Released: March 24, 2009
- Studios: Scotland Yard, Dartmouth, Nova Scotia
- Genres: Indie rock Folk rock Folk
- Length: 104:56 (47:16 Three To One version)
- Label: MapleMusic
- Producer: Joel Plaskett

Joel Plaskett chronology
Ashtray Rock (2007)	Three (2009)	EMERGENCYs, false alarms, shipwrecks, castaways, fragile creatures, special features, demons and demonstrations (2011)

Professional ratings
Review scores
Source	Rating
PopMatters	(6/10)

Three is the third solo album by Canadian indie rock musician Joel Plaskett, released on March 24, 2009. Plaskett produced and recorded the album himself at his own Scotland Yard studio in Dartmouth, Nova Scotia.

In addition to being released as a triple album, the number three is reflected in several other aspects of the album. Each disc has nine songs on it, many of which are titled with a single word or phrase repeated three times. The album's release date of 3/24/09 also consists of numbers divisible by three, the cover features an image of Plaskett holding three fingers up, and preorders through MapleMusic were distributed with access to exclusive tickets, priced at $66, which would entitle the purchaser to a seat in the first twelve rows of Plaskett's concert at Toronto's Massey Hall the night before the album's release. According to Plaskett, the discs tell a story of "going away, being alone and coming home", with each disc representing one of those three themes.

Guest musicians on the album include singers Ana Egge and Rose Cousins, who were at the Folk Alliance festival in Memphis in 2007. The three of them tried jamming at Easley McCain Recording in Memphis, and Plaskett decided he wanted to have them on his new album and write parts for them. Plaskett's father Bill was also a significant contributor to the album, offering songwriting and arranging, vocals, and playing bouzouki, acoustic guitar, tenor guitar, and piano.

The album was shortlisted for the 2009 Polaris Music Prize. It won Contemporary Album of the Year at the 2009 Canadian Folk Music Awards.

In June 2009, Plaskett released a follow-up EP, entitled Three More, which contained three songs not featured on the original album.

In 2010, Plaskett released a condensed version of Three called Three to One primarily for the non-Canadian market.

== Track listing ==
All tracks are written by Joel Plaskett, except where noted.

Disc one
No.	Title	Writer(s)	Length
1.	"Every Time You Leave"		2:20
2.	"Through & Through & Through"		4:25
3.	"You Let Me Down"		2:22
4.	"Pine, Pine, Pine"		2:09
5.	"Wait, Wait, Wait"	N. Neville	2:27
6.	"Drifters Raus"	Matthew Grimson	3:06
7.	"Gone, Gone, Gone"		3:56
8.	"Wishful Thinking"		7:14
9.	"Run, Run, Run"		5:12

Disc two
No.	Title	Writer(s)	Length
1.	"Safe in Your Arms"		4:05
2.	"Shine On, Shine On, Shine On"	Joel Plaskett; ending: Traditional, "The Verdant Braes of Skreen"	4:11
3.	"Sailors Eyes"		3:20
4.	"Heartless, Heartless, Heartless"	Joel and Bill Plaskett	4:20
5.	"In the Blue Moonlight"		3:27
6.	"Down, Down, Down"		2:22
7.	"Beyond, Beyond, Beyond"		4:40
8.	"Demons"		3:33
9.	"New Scotland Blues"		3:45

Disc three
No.	Title	Length
1.	"Rewind, Rewind, Rewind"	2:09
2.	"Precious, Precious, Precious"	1:19
3.	"Deny, Deny, Deny"	2:30
4.	"One Look"	3:14
5.	"Our Place in the Sun"	3:18
6.	"Lazy Bones"	5:22
7.	"All the Way Down the Line"	4:26
8.	"Rollin', Rollin', Rollin'"	3:15
9.	"On & On & On"	12:29

=== Three More ===
No.	Title	Length
1.	"Compete with Loneliness"
2.	"Spinning for You"
3.	"Stay, Stay, Stay"

=== Three to One ===
No.	Title	Length
1.	"Deny, Deny, Deny"	2:30
2.	"Through and Through and Through"	4:25
3.	"You Let Me Down"	2:22
4.	"Rewind, Rewind, Rewind"	2:09
5.	"Precious, Precious, Precious"	1:19
6.	"Run, Run, Run"	5:12
7.	"Safe in Your Arms"	4:05
8.	"Sailors Eyes"	3:20
9.	"New Scotland Blues"	3:45
10.	"One Look"	3:14
11.	"All the Way Down the Line"	4:26
12.	"Rollin', Rollin', Rollin'"	3:15
13.	"Wishful Thinking"	7:14
