= Colleen Brown =

Canadian musician

- Origin: Edmonton, Alberta, Canada
- Genres: Adult contemporary, folk, pop, rock
- Years active: 2004–present
- Label: Independent
- Website: www.colleenbrownmusic.com

Colleen Brown is a Canadian singer, songwriter and multi-instrumentalist from Edmonton, Alberta.

== History ==
Brown spent her childhood in Lloydminster, on the border of Saskatchewan and Alberta, where she studied ballet, visual art, classical piano, voice and musical theatre. Upon moving to Edmonton, she studied music at Grant MacEwan College in the Vocal Performance Program. Upon graduating she sang and danced in the now defunct Kit Kat Club a large show-band that covered music of the 1960s, 1970s and 1980s, and began playing bass and singing in the all female rock band The Secretaries.

== Music ==
In 2004, she released her first full-length album, A Peculiar Thing. The album was funded by Brown and contained all new music.

Her second album, Foot In Heart, was released in 2008. It became the number 2 Folk/Roots/Blues album in Canada on !earshot (the Canadian national college/community radio chart) and spent 6 weeks in the top 10. It was later re-released on Emm Gryner's label Dead Daisy Records in 2010. There were two singles from the album that were played in heavy rotation on CBC Radio, 'Boyfriend' and 'Love You Baby'. The latter was used in a CBC Radio 2 Television commercial alongside K'naan's 'Wavin' Flag'.

As well as a skilled pianist, Brown has branched out to embrace other instruments in her performances, notably electric guitar and bass. She credits this and working with her backing band as helping her to develop and refine her songwriting abilities.

Brown has toured extensively across Canada in support of her releases, sharing stages with some big names like Frank Black, Jakob Dylan, Don McLean and Randy Newman - after whom she named a track on the album Direction. Other releases include Colleen Brown's DIRT (2012), Direction 1: Major Love EP (2014) - for which she created elaborate home-demo recordings, Direction (2015) - which includes her first home-recorded release "I Asked In The Night", and 2016's Seasons Are Circling which features a slew of collaborations and some home recordings with Canadian artists Jesse Northey, Mitchmatic, Be-bop Cortez, Slow Leaves aka Grant Davidson, Ido Vanderlaan, Scenic Route To Alaska, and David Celia.

Comparisons to Joni Mitchell are commonplace, referencing Brown's similar vocal agility, phrasing and timbre. (Brown attributes this similarity to their shared Saskatchewan upbringing and background in classical and jazz studies). In 2016, Brown joined a cast of top Alberta-based musicians for "Up On Cripple Creek", a touring production of the music of The Last Waltz produced by CKUA Radio's Peter North, during which she sang and played three Mitchell compositions, plus other pieces from Emmylou Harris and The Band. Brown has also taken part in tributes to Laura Nyro, Gordon Lightfoot, The Pretenders, and Heart (band).

On August 24, 2018, Brown released a full-length album collaboration with Edmonton based artists Scenic Route To Alaska and Jesse and the Dandelions, with appearances by frequent collaborator Elijah Abrams (Oh Susanna, The Abrams Brothers, B&Steve). The album was recorded by Jesse Northey and Aaron Goldstein (Daniel Romano) with Kenny Meehan, Gus van Go and Werner F and released on Cowboy Junkies' imprint Latent Recordings. Two singles from the album - Tear It Down and So Good - charted in the Top 20 on CBC Radio 2. The album spent 13 weeks in the earshot! Top 50.

== Discography ==
=== Studio albums ===
- 2004: A Peculiar Thing
- 2008: Foot In Heart (Dead Daisy Records)
- 2009: The Secretaries (featuring The Brassholes)
- 2012: Dirt
- 2014: Direction 1: Major Love EP
- 2015: Direction
- 2016: Seasons Are Circling EP
- 2018: Major Love: Major Love (Latent Recordings/Warner)
- 2020: Isolation Songs
- 2021: Home (Christmas EP)
