= Party of One (podcast) =

Actual Play podcast

- Genre: Comedy, adventure, Drama, role-playing
- Language: English

Cast and voices
- Hosted by: Jeff Stormer

Music
- Theme music composed by: Mega Ran ft. D&D Sluggers
- Opening theme: Infinite Lives

Production
- Production: Jeff Stormer and Jen Frank

Publication
- Original release: October 26, 2015
- Updates: Weekly

Related
- Website: https://www.partyofonepodcast.com/

Party of One is an actual-play tabletop role-playing game podcast, hosted by Jeff Stormer and edited by Jen Frank.

== Description ==
Party of One is an unscripted actual play podcast featuring host Jeff Stormer and a weekly guest who come together to play a two-player role-playing game.

=== Cast ===
The gamemaster for the podcast sessions is usually Jeff Stormer, however for some games the guest of the week may choose to gamemaster. In some episodes, the game the duo choose to play do not have a gamemaster role.

== Reception and Awards ==
Stormer interviewed a special guest at the 2017 Philadelphia Podcast Festival, and played a tabletop roleplaying game with them, at Amalgam Comics and Coffeehouse in Fishtown.

Party of One was nominated in the "Best Series" category for the 2020 Good Games Writing Awards. Party of One was nominated for "Best Podcast" for the 2021 ENNIE Awards. At the 2021 New Jersey Webfest, Party of One was nominated for "Best Anthology," "Best Series Premise of an Actual Play," "Outstanding Actual Play Podcast not playing D&D," and Jeff Stormer was nominated in the "Best Gamemaster" category, and Stormer was nominated for "Best Game Master (in an Actual Play Podcast)" with the podcast itself being nominated for "Outstanding Actual Play Podcast (Not playing D&D)" and "Best Anthology" in 2022, and nominated for "Best Game Master (Actual Play Podcast)", "Best Series Premise (Actual Play)", "Outstanding Actual Play (Podcast)", and "Best Family Friendly" in 2023, and nominated for "Best Player Character Performance in an Actual Play (Podcast)", "Best Premise of an Actual Play", and "Outstanding Anthology" in 2024.

Jeff Stormer for Party of One won "Best GM in an Actual Play" and got an Honorable Mention at the 2023 BNM Webfest.
