= Truthfully Truthfully =

Studio album by Joel Plaskett Emergency
- Released: October 21, 2003
- Recorded: Sonic Temple, Halifax, Nova Scotia May 2003
- Genre: Indie rock
- Length: 46:02
- Label: MapleMusic Recordings, Universal Music Canada
- Producer: Ian McGettigan, Joel Plaskett

Joel Plaskett Emergency chronology
Down at the Khyber (2001)	Truthfully Truthfully (2003)	La De Da (2005)

Truthfully Truthfully is the second album by artist Joel Plaskett under the band name Joel Plaskett Emergency and his third since splitting from Thrush Hermit.

== Track listing ==
All songs written by Joel Plaskett except where noted.

1. "Written All Over Me" – 3:52
2. "Work Out Fine" – 3:37
3. "Mystery and Crime" – 3:30
4. "Extraordinary" – 3:48
5. "Come On Teacher" – 3:47
6. "The Red Light" – 4:46
7. "Radio Fly" – 3:53
8. "You Came Along" – 4:40
9. "Lights Down Low" – 3:46
10. "The Day You Walked Away" – 3:49
11. "All the Pretty Faces" – 3:25
12. "Heart to Heart With Lionel" (David Marsh) – 3:09

== Album credits ==
=== Personnel ===
- Joel Plaskett - Guitar
- Dave Marsh - Drums
- Tim Brennan - Bass

=== Production ===
- Recorded at Sonic Temple, Halifax, Nova Scotia (May 2003)
- Produced by Ian McGettigan and Joel Plaskett
- Engineered by Ian McGettigan and Charles Austin
- Assistant Engineer - Darren Van Niekerk
- Mixed at Iguauna Recording, Toronto, Ontario (June 2003)
- Mixing Engineer - Alfio Annibalini
- Assistant Mixing Engineer - John Nazario
- Mastered by Brett Zilahi at Metalworks Studios, Toronto, ON
