= Ana Egge =

American singer-songwriter (born 1976)

- Born: Ana Egge; Estevan, Saskatchewan, Canada
- Origin: Ambrose, North Dakota, U.S.
- Genres: Folk
- Occupation: Singer-songwriter
- Instruments: Guitar, mandolin, piano
- Years active: 1994–present
- Labels: Lazy S.O.B., Ammal Records, StorySound Records
- Website: www.anaegge.com

Ana G. Egge (born September 20, 1976) is a Canadian/American folk musician and songwriter.

== Early life ==
Ana G. Egge was born on September 20, 1976 in Estevan, Saskatchewan, Canada.

Egge grew up the daughter of a teacher and a wheat farmer in Ambrose, North Dakota, and later moved to Silver City, New Mexico. She spent some of her childhood traveling back and forth from North Dakota to a hot springs commune in New Mexico.

When Egge was 16 years old, she began a one-year apprenticeship with luthier Don Musser, to build her own guitar which she still plays exclusively.

== Career ==
Early songs Egge wrote were noticed by bassist Sarah Brown (Albert Collins, Bonnie Raitt) and guitarist Steve James, who persuaded her to record the 1994 cassette EP of original songs in Austin, Texas. This EP led to a recording contract with Lazy S.O.B. Recordings and the release of her first full-length album, River Under The Road. The title track was co-written by Egge, Sarah Brown, and Jimmie Dale Gilmore. The following year, the Austin Music Awards named Egge, then nineteen, their "Best Singer/Songwriter" and "Best Folk Artist".

In 1998 Egge lent her voice to the soundtrack for the television movie The Baby Dance, starring Stockard Channing and Laura Dern, with music composed by Terry Allen and featuring Egge, Lucinda Williams, and Lloyd Maines, among others.

Next Egge was invited on tour by Jimmie Dale Gilmore, Iris DeMent, Shawn Colvin and Ron Sexsmith. She recorded her first live album Mile Marker on her solo tour in 1999. She later shared the stage with John Prine, Lucinda Williams, George Jones and Sinéad O'Connor among others. After a few years of constant touring, Egge returned to Silver City, New Mexico where she began building her own house in the desert and spending time with family. In 2002, after writing some of the songs for her next record, Egge resettled in Brooklyn, New York.

In Brooklyn she met bassist Jason Mercer (Ani DiFranco, Ron Sexsmith) and they began recording demos of Egge's new songs. Singer-songwriter Ron Sexsmith, guitarist Tony Scherr and trumpeter Shane Endsley joined their efforts and the result was Out Past the Light which received critical acclaim. "Listen to the lyrics," Lucinda Williams urged an audience one night after the album was out. "She's a folk Nina Simone."

Egge's Lazy Days was released on November 13, 2007. It is an album made up of cover songs on the theme of laziness. Songs include The Kinks' "Sitting in the Midday Sun", Arcade Fire's "In the Backseat", The Zombies' "I Could Spend a Day" and Belle and Sebastian's "Summer Wastin'". Though all songs on the album were written by others, "Egge makes them her own through her distinctively laid-back approach. She drawls out the lyrics like a yawn, but the kind that settles in your soul like a sigh."

In July 2007 she won The Mountain Stage New Song Regional Competition in New York City.

Egge released her sixth record, Road to My Love, in February 2009. The record was co-produced by Egge and her longtime collaborator Jason Mercer and includes guest musicians Steve Moore, Michael Jerome, Frazey Ford and Trish Klein of The Be Good Tanyas, Adam Levy and Tony Scherr.

She also appears as a guest musician on Joel Plaskett's 2009 album Three and has performed as a backup singer and musician and as a solo artist on his 'Three' world tour.

Egge released her seventh record, Bad Blood, on August 23, 2011. The record was produced by Steve Earle and recorded at Levon Helm's studio in Woodstock, New York and was released by Danny Goldberg's Ammal Records.

In 2015 Egge released Bright Shadow, an all-acoustic, intimate album produced by Egge herself and engineered by long-time friend and collaborator Steve Addabbo featuring The Stray Birds as her back-up band on mandolin, fiddle, banjo, upright bass, dobro and harmony vocals.

In 2016 Egge collaborated with the Danish indie-folk band The Sentimentals on Say That Now. Co-written and co-produced by Egge and The Sentimentals, recorded in Copenhagen, DK.

In 2018 Egge signed with the NYC-based label StorySound Records. Her first release with the label was a single, "We Are One." Produced by Stewart Lerman and co-written by Gary Nicholson, it features Steve Holley (Wings) and Paul Socolow (David Byrne).

In 2018 Egge released White Tiger. Produced by Alec Spiegelman and features Buck Meek (Big Thief), Anais Mitchel (Hadestown) and Billy Strings.

Egge released her eleventh full-length album Is It The Kiss in 2019. It was produced by Alec Spiegelman and features Iris DeMent, Buck Meek (Big Thief) and Matt Davidson (Twain).

In 2019 Egge released a live recording of her previously released song, "We Are One." Produced by Stewart Lerman and co-written by Gary Nicholson, it features The Brooklyn Unitarian Choir, Arthur Vint, and Jacob Silver.

In the first months of 2021, Ana released a virtual two-sided single, “This Time,” which received praise from musicians Rufus Wainwright and Anais Mitchell. It would be followed by single “The Ship,” which American Songwriter wrote “speaks quietly but defiantly of a simmering revolution brewing in the world today, reconciled only by an understanding that working together achieves a harmonious goal.” The singles were produced by Stewart Lerman and feature background vocals from J. Hoard and Lucy Wainright Roche, strings by Rob Moose and bass by Scott Colberg.

Later that same year, Between Us was released on StorySound Records, featuring songs that express the tumult and divisive nature of the world and explore ways to confront difficult issues between people of opposing views. Between Us was produced by Lorenzo Wolff and features bassist Michael Isvara Montgomery, guitarist Jonny Lam and keyboardist Jon Cowherd.

In 2023 Egge released the single “Heart Is a Mirror,” co-written with Gary Nicholson, produced by Lorenzo Wolff and featuring Rob Moose, Michael Isvara Montgomery, Dillon Treacy and Alec Spiegelman.

In 2024 Egge released Sharing In The Spirit. The album opens with “Don't You Sleep,” a civil rights celebration of hope and hard work. “Where Berries Grow” is a bluegrass track about people Ana has loved and known. The album also deals with themes of alcoholism and sobriety, with “Mission Bells Moan” and a cover of the Ted Hawkins classic “Sorry You're Sick.” The final track, a cover of “Last Day of Our Acquaintance,” pays tribute to Sinead O'Connor. Produced by Lorenzo Wolff, the album features Mike Robinson, Alex Hargreaves, Kirk Shoener, Rob Heath and Bill Campbell and background vocalists Kiena Williams and Tyrone Davis.

In 2024 Egge released her first Christmas song, “Silver Bells Ring,” co-written with Bryan Thomas. Produced by Lorenzo Wolff, it features Mike Robinson, Alex Hargreaves, Josh Dion and Chris Morrisey.

In 2025 Egge released the single “Frogs of Portland,” inspired by the protesters who dressed in animal costumes and reclaimed the frog as a symbol of resistance to Trump's efforts to militarize the city. It was produced by Egge and engineered by Nate Golub.

Egge's songs have been recorded by Dave Alvin, Laurie Lewis, Mick Flannery, Coutrney Hartman, Alden-Harris McCoy, Maya DeVitry, Laura Cortese & The Dance Cards, and Matt the Electrician.

Her songs have been featured on the television shows I'm from Rolling Stone (MTV) and Shameless (Showtime).

Egge is the subject of a full-length documentary directed by Jesse Lyda titled Bright Shadow, released in 2015.

== Personal life ==
She currently lives in Brooklyn, New York.

== Discography ==
- Ana Egge (1994)
- River Under the Road (1997)
- Mile Marker (1999)
- 101 Sundays (2000)
- Out Past the Lights (2004)
- Lazy Days (2007)
- Road to My Love (2009)
- Bad Blood (2011)
- Bright Shadow (2015)
- Say That Now (with The Sentimentals) (2016)
- We Are One (2018)
- White Tiger (2018)
- Is It The Kiss (2019)
- We Are One (live single feat. The Brooklyn Unitarian Choir) (2019)
- This Time (single) (2021)
- The Ship (single) (2021)
- Between Us (2021)
- Heart Is A Mirror (single) (2023)
- Sharing in the Spirit (2024)
- Silver Bells Ring (single) (2024)
- Frogs of Portland (single) (2025)

=== Compilations ===
- Forever Dusty – A Tribute to Dusty Springfield (1998): "Breakfast in Bed"
- 38 Songs of Hope – Parkingsong (2004): "Wedding Dress"'
- My Old Man: A Tribute to Steve Goodman (2006): "Old Fashioned Girl"'

=== Guest appearances ===
- Roberto Moreno, One Possible Explanation (1998)
- Matt the Electrician, Baseball Song (1998)
- Kelly Hogan & The Pine Valley Cosmonauts, Beneath The Country Underdog (2000)
- Ron Sexsmith, Blue Boy (2001)
- Eliza Gilkyson, Paradise Hotel (2005)
- Tandy, To a Friend (2006)
- Nels Andrews, Off Track Betting (2007)
- Rose Polenzani, When the River Meets the Sea (2008)
- Joel Plaskett, Three (2009)
- Good Luck Mountain, Good Luck Mountain (2011)
- Good Luck Mountain, Good Luck Mountain Too (2014)
- Matt Patershuk, I Was So Fond Of You (2016)
- Matt Patershuk, Same As I Ever Have Been (2017)
- Dick Connette, Too Sad for the Public, Vol. 1 - Oysters Ice Cream Lemonade (2017)
- The RT's, The RT's (2021)
- Kris Delmhorst, Ghosts in the Garden (2025)
