= Dave Marsh (musician) =

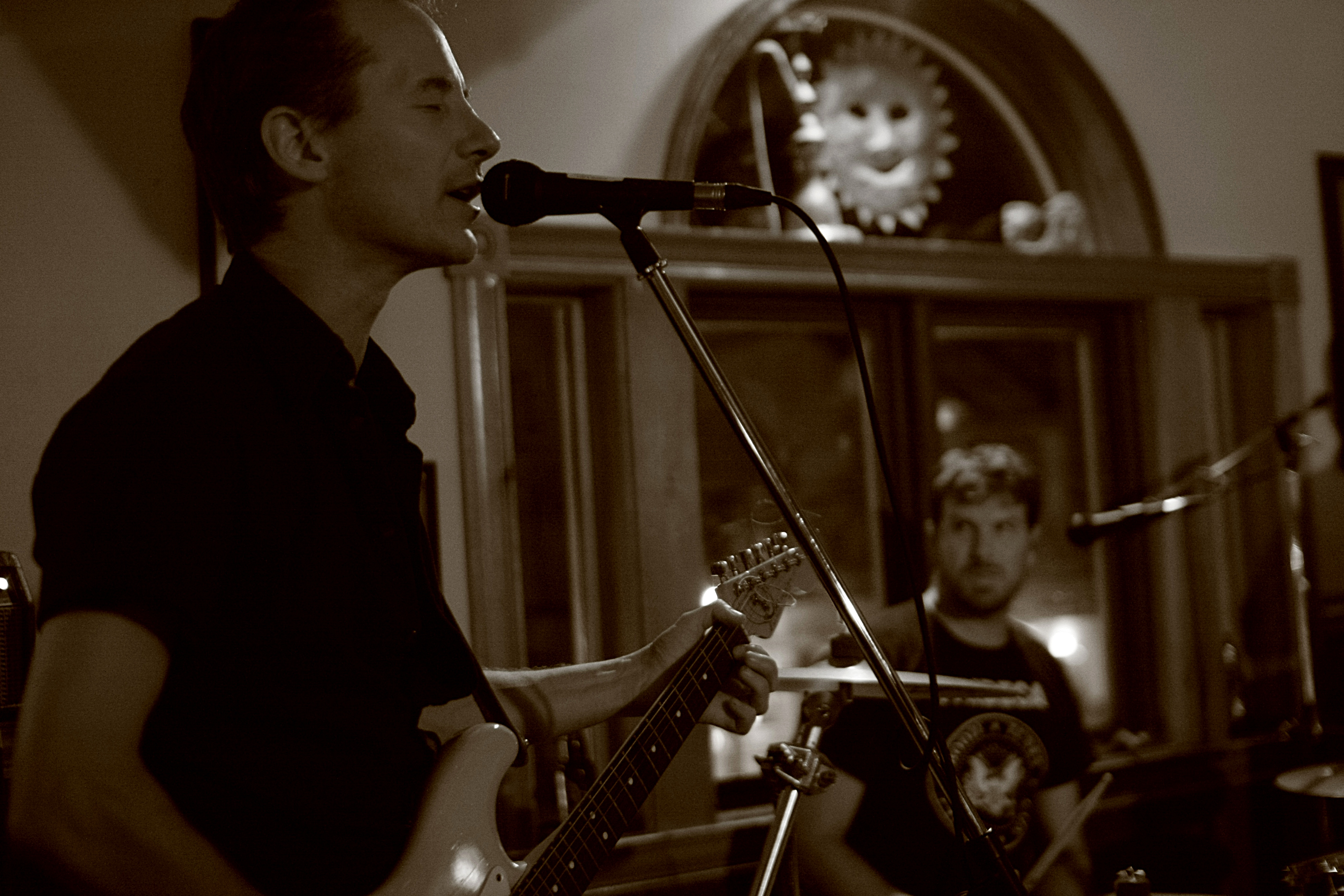

Background information
- Born: 1963 (age 62–63); Halifax, Nova Scotia, Canada
- Genre: Rock
- Occupation: Musician
- Instruments: Drums, guitar
- Years active: 1983–present
- Label: Stove Records

Dave Marsh is a Canadian musician, best known for being drummer of Halifax power pop group The Super Friendz in the 1990s, of Joel Plaskett Emergency in the 2000s, and as a solo artist.

== Solo career ==
Marsh's debut album, The True Love Rules, was released on July 29, 2008. It was produced by Dave Marsh and Joel Plaskett, and was nominated for "Male Solo Recording of the Year" and "Rock Recording of the Year" at the 2010 East Coast Music Awards. Marsh and his band, The True Love Rules, toured in support of the album in 2008 and 2009, opening for fellow Halifax acts Sloan and Joel Plaskett Emergency.

Throughout 2011–2012 Marsh worked on songs for his next project and played shows with his band the True Love Rules, often featuring Paul Boudreau on bass guitar and Scotty MacCullough on drums, in between a busy touring and recording schedule with the Joel Plaskett Emergency. His second album, The Cause Of Many Troubles, was released in 2013 on his own record label, Stove Records. Recorded primarily at the Echo Chamber in Halifax and self-produced, it featured many local guest artists including John Boudreau, Rob Crowell, Andrew Scott, and Tim Brennan and received good reviews across the country.

Marsh next produced his friend, Thomas McGachy Smith, who frequently opened local shows for the True Love Rules, with an album called Mugak Heart. This 2014 release was the second release on Stove Records, however it was marred by the passing of Smith in November 2013. This album, and the unforgettable character who was known as Mugak, has become a real cult classic.

Also during this period Marsh began collaborating with ex King Konqueror vocalist, Steve Rolston, on a project which eventually morphed into a rockin' band with punk roots, called Rolly & The Navy Brats. An album, produced by Dave Marsh, has been recorded and is expected to be released.

In 2016, Marsh released a vinyl 45 on Stove Records with A side "The Green Fields of Shannon Park", featuring Mo Kenney. The B side, also with Mo Kenney was "Buy A Guitar (Before You Kill Someone)". The vinyl 45 includes a digital download card. 2016 also saw more studio sessions including work with Erin Costello and teenage friend Clive MacNutt.

2017 saw more touring with the Joel Plaskett Emergency and studio work at New Scotland Yard with Plaskett producing Prince Edward Island native Dennis Ellesworth.
