= MapleMusic Recordings =

Canadian independent record label

Cadence Recordings
- Parent company: Cadence Music Group
- Founded: 1999
- Founder: Grant Dexter; Andy Maize
- Distributors: Fontana North; Universal Music Canada
- Genre: Rock, EDM & Rap/Hip-Hop
- Country of origin: Canada
- Location: Toronto, Ontario

Cadence Recordings, formerly MapleMusic Recordings, is a Canadian independent record label founded by Andy Maize, Jeff Maize, Mike Alkier, Evan Hu, Lorique Mindel and Grant Dexter in 1999 and based in Toronto, Ontario. Other investors include Gary Slaight, Michael Burke and Universal Music. In 2016, its parent company Maple Core changed its name to Cadence Music Group, and as a result, MapleMusic was renamed as Cadence Recordings.

== History ==
The MapleMusic Recordings label is a project of Andy Maize from Canadian roots rock band Skydiggers and Maple CEO Grant Dexter. Other artists who have released albums on MapleMusic include Carly Rae Jepsen, David Usher, Colin James, Boy, The Dears, Danny Michel, Jason Bajada, Martha Wainwright, Pilot Speed (formerly known as Pilate), Gordon Downie, Joel Plaskett, Spirit of the West, Ridley Bent, Kinnie Starr, Cookie Duster and the Hugh Dillon Redemption Choir.

MapleMusic released three Radiohead albums In Rainbows, The King of Limbs and TKOL RMX 1234567 in Canada, along with ATO in the US and XL in the UK.

Singer-songwriter Sam Roberts has transformed from a struggling independent musician to a Canadian rock musician practically overnight by his 2001 MapleMusic Recordings debut, The Inhuman Condition, and Kathleen Edwards, whose album Failer made her a critical favourite in 2003.

MapleMusic Recordings' brick and mortar business is distributed and marketed in Canada by Universal Music Canada.

In 2015, Iain M.Taylor became CEO of MapleMusic.

In March 2016, the label announced it had changed its name to Cadence Recordings after MapleCore was renamed as Cadence Music Group.

== Artists ==
=== Current ===
- 22-20s
- Alabama Shakes
- Alberta Cross
- Trey Anastasio
- Andrew Austin
- Autolux
- Jason Bajada
- Danny Barnes
- Rayland Baxter
- Beady Eye
- The Bees
- Ridley Bent
- Bo Keeney
- Boots Electric
- The Bright Light Social Hour
- Brighter Brightest
- The Bronx
- Jim Bryson & The Weakerthans
- John Butler Trio
- Butter the Children
- Candy Coated Killahz
- Carl Broemel
- Don Brownrigg
- Caveman
- Chantal Kreviazuk
- Chet Faker
- Codeine Velvet Club
- Cold War Kids
- Cookie Duster
- Thomas D'Arcy
- Delphic
- The Dismemberment Plan
- Drive-By Truckers
- Eastern Conference Champions
- Kathleen Edwards
- Everest
- Fitz and the Tantrums
- Jonny Fritz
- Gomez
- Gogol Bordello
- GUS
- Lisa Hannigan
- Hatcham Social
- The Henry Clay People
- Patterson Hood
- Houses
- J. Roddy Walston and the Business
- Jim James
- Sass Jordan
- Jovanotti
- Language Arts
- Daniel Lanois
- Bobby Long
- Lucero
- Vusi Mahlasela
- Mariachi El Bronx
- Miike Snow
- Minus the Bear
- Misstress Barbara
- The Most Serene Republic
- My Morning Jacket
- Nash
- Sierra Noble
- Neverending White Lights
- Okkervil River
- Old Crow Medicine Show
- Old Self & Kam Speech
- OLD SELF (aka MAN & Mortamis) Musician/Producer
- Organ Thieves
- Other Lives
- Ben Ottewell
- Doug Paisley
- Phish
- Pilot Speed (formerly Pilate)
- Joel Plaskett
- Kam Speech (aka Speechless) Musician/Producer
- Port O'Brien
- Port St. Willow
- Primus
- Pure Bathing Culture
- Radiohead
- Rodrigo y Gabriela
- Caitlin Rose
- The River and The Road
- Royal Teeth
- Royal Wood
- Rusko
- San Fermin
- Gordie Sampson
- Primal Scream
- Sea Wolf
- Silversun Pickups
- SOJA
- Theresa Sokyrka
- Stereophonics
- Allen Stone
- Thought Beneath Film
- Two Gallants
- Typhoon
- David Usher
- Butch Walker
- Martha Wainwright
- White Denim
- White Rabbits
- Widespread Panic
- Wildcat! Wildcat!
- Jonathan Wilson
- Andrew Wyatt

=== Former ===
- 311
- Ashes of Soma
- BOY
- Braided
- Brendan Benson
- Cowboy Junkies
- Crowded House
- Dala
- Dawes
- DJ Champion
- Mike Doughty
- Gordon Downie
- Peter Elkas
- Fiction Family
- The Fireman
- Grady
- David Gray
- Headstones
- Colin James
- Jem
- Carly Rae Jepsen
- Sass Jordan
- Kill the Lights
- Patrick Krief
- Ben Kweller
- Land of Talk
- The Latency
- The Lowest of the Low
- Massari
- Danny Michel
- Mike Ford
- The Miniatures
- Not by Choice
- Lesley Pike
- Jason Plumb
- Prozzak
- The Rankin Family
- Sam Roberts
- Spirit of the West
- Kinnie Starr
- Tegan and Sara
- Simon Wilcox
- The Whigs

== Awards and accolades ==
=== Juno Awards ===
The Juno Awards are presented by the Canadian Academy of Recording Arts and Sciences.

Year	Nominee / work	Award	Result
2002	Joel Plaskett Emergency Down at the Khyber	Alternative Album of the Year	Nominated
2003	Kathleen Edwards Failer	Roots and Traditional Album of the Year	Nominated
2004	Joel Plaskett Emergency Truthfully Truthfully	Alternative Album of the Year	Nominated
2004	Kathleen Edwards	Songwriter of the Year	Nominated
2004	The Dears	New Group of the Year	Nominated
2004	Kinnie Starr	New Artist of the Year	Nominated
2004	Danny Michel	New Artist of the Year	Nominated
2005	Gordie Sampson	Songwriter of the Year	Nominated
2006	Theresa Sokyrka These Old Charms	Pop Album of the Year	Nominated
2006	Kathleen Edwards Back To Me	Adult Alternative Album of the Year	Nominated
2006	Kathleen Edwards	Songwriter of the Year	Nominated
2006	Joel Plaskett	Songwriter of the Year	Nominated
2006	Martha Wainwright	New Artist of the Year	Nominated
2007	Gordie Sampson	Songwriter of the Year	Won
2007	Neverending White Lights	New Artist of the Year	Nominated
2008	Joel Plaskett	Songwriter of the Year	Nominated
2009	David Usher Wake Up and Say Goodbye	Pop Album of the Year	Nominated
2009	Kathleen Edwards, Asking for Flowers	Adult Alternative Album of the Year	Nominated
2009	Gordie Sampson	Songwriter of the Year	Nominated
2010	Joel Plaskett Three	Adult Alternative Album of the Year	Won
2010	Joel Plaskett	Songwriter of the Year	Nominated
2010	Carly Rae Jepsen & Ryan Stewart	Songwriter of the Year	Nominated
2010	Carly Rae Jepsen	New Artist of the Year	Nominated
2011	Royal Wood	Songwriter of the Year	Nominated
2013	Kathleen Edwards	Songwriter of the Year	Nominated
2013	Kathleen Edwards Voyageur	Adult Alternative Album of the Year	Nominated
2013	Royal Wood, We Were Born to Glory	Adult Alternative Album of the Year	Nominated

=== Polaris Music Prize ===
The Polaris Music Prize is an award given to the best Canadian full-length album based solely on artistic merit.

Year	Nominee / work	Award	Result
2007	Joel Plaskett Ashtray Rock	Polaris Music Prize Short List	Nominated
2007	The Dears Gang of Losers	Polaris Music Prize Short List	Nominated
2008	Kathleen Edwards Asking For Flowers	Polaris Music Prize Short List	Nominated
2009	Joel Plaskett Three	Polaris Music Prize Short List	Nominated
2009	Martha Wainwright I Know You're Married But I've Got Feelings Too	Polaris Music Prize Long List	Nominated
2012	Kathleen Edwards Voyageur	Polaris Music Prize Short List	Nominated
2012	Joel Plaskett Emergency Scrappy Happiness	Polaris Music Prize Long List	Nominated

== See also ==
- List of record labels
- Music of Canada
