= Mo Kenney =

Canadian singer-songwriter

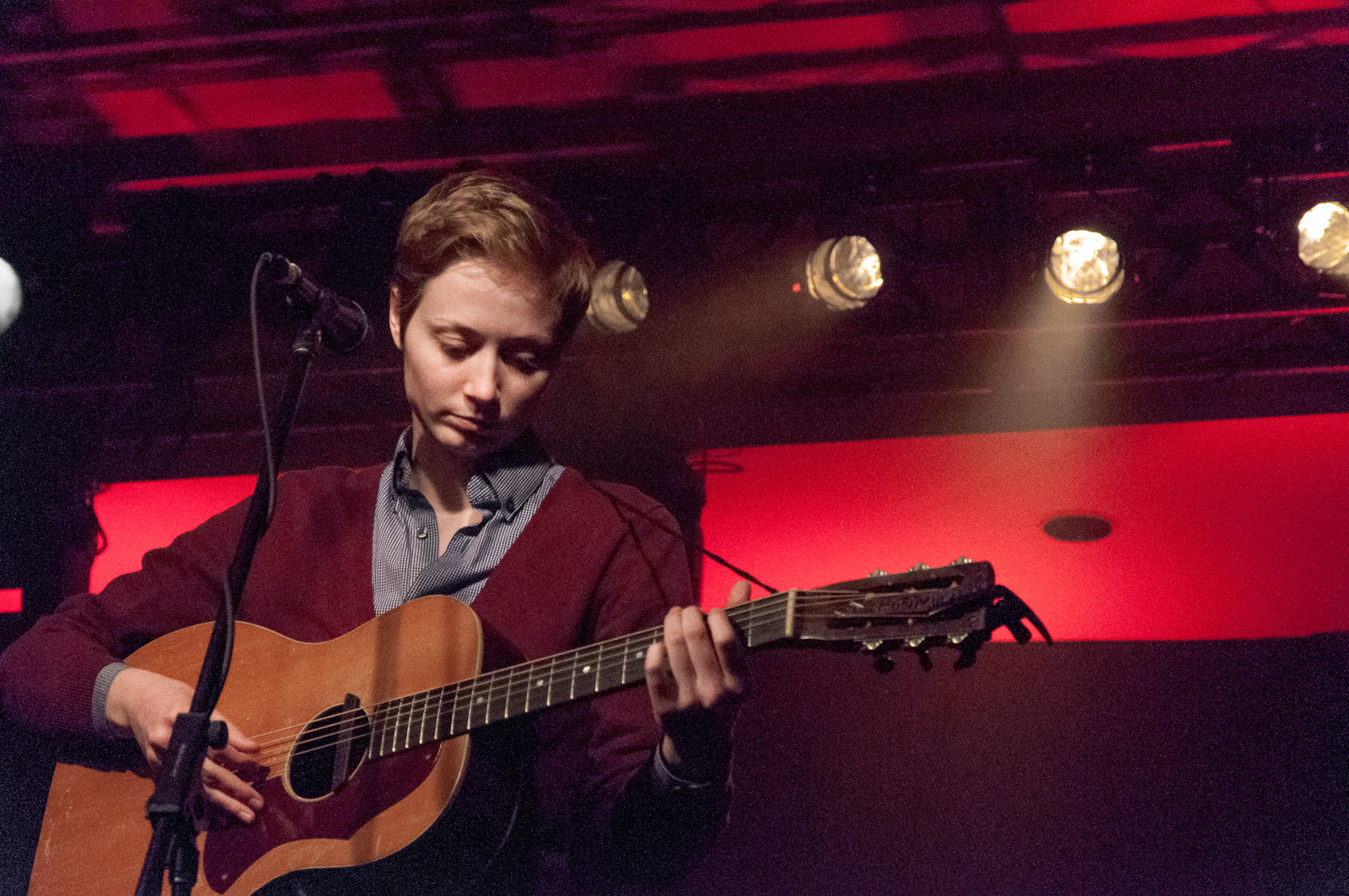
- Mo Kenney performing at East Coast Music Week in 2013.

Background information
- Born: Morgan Kenney; June 5, 1990 (age 36); Halifax, Nova Scotia, Canada
- Occupations: songwriter, performer, recording artist
- Instruments: Vocals, Guitar, Piano, Bass, Drums
- Years active: 2010-present
- Labels: New Scotland Records, Pheromone Recordings

Mo Kenney (born 1990) is a Canadian singer and songwriter based in Dartmouth, Nova Scotia. Catching the ear of noted Canadian rocker Joel Plaskett while still in school, Kenney released their first album in 2012, which Plaskett produced. Kenney is known for their lyrical prowess and engaging stage presence. Called "Nova Scotia's rising star" by The Scene magazine, they have toured with Plaskett as well as with Ron Sexsmith. In 2013, their song "Sucker" won the prestigious SOCAN Songwriting Prize.

== Background ==
Kenney began playing guitar when they were 11. They became interested in music via classic rock; among their favourite artists in their early teens were Led Zeppelin, Pink Floyd, and Ozzy Osbourne. When they found themself grounded for two months by their parents at age 16, they began writing songs in earnest and listening to singer/songwriters such as Elliott Smith. Smith in particular inspired Kenney to learn finger-picking. At around the same age, they also began to draw inspiration from the indie rock world, thanks to exposure to the films of Wes Anderson, and the adventurous soundtracks he favors.

== Career ==
Kenney first began recording their songs at a small recording studio housed at the Shambhala School, a non-denominational private school in Halifax, when they were 17. Joel Plaskett visited the school one day to talk about playing and recording music, and listened to what they had recorded. Two years later, Plaskett's manager called Kenney with the news that they were invited to attend Gordie Sampson's Songcamp in Cape Breton. Kenney later began working on their first recording with Plaskett, starting in April 2011.

Although hampered by severe stage fright when first beginning to perform, Kenney now impresses critics with their at-ease and affable stage presence. Among their notable international performances to date, Kenney played at the Iceland Airwaves Music Festival in October 2012 and at the Great Escape Festival in Brighton in May 2013.

Their debut album, entitled Mo Kenney, was produced by Plaskett and recorded at his studio in Dartmouth. The album was released in September 2012 by New Scotland Records and Pheromone Recordings. Plaskett co-wrote two of the album's songs with Kenney. The two of them are the only musicians who play on the album.

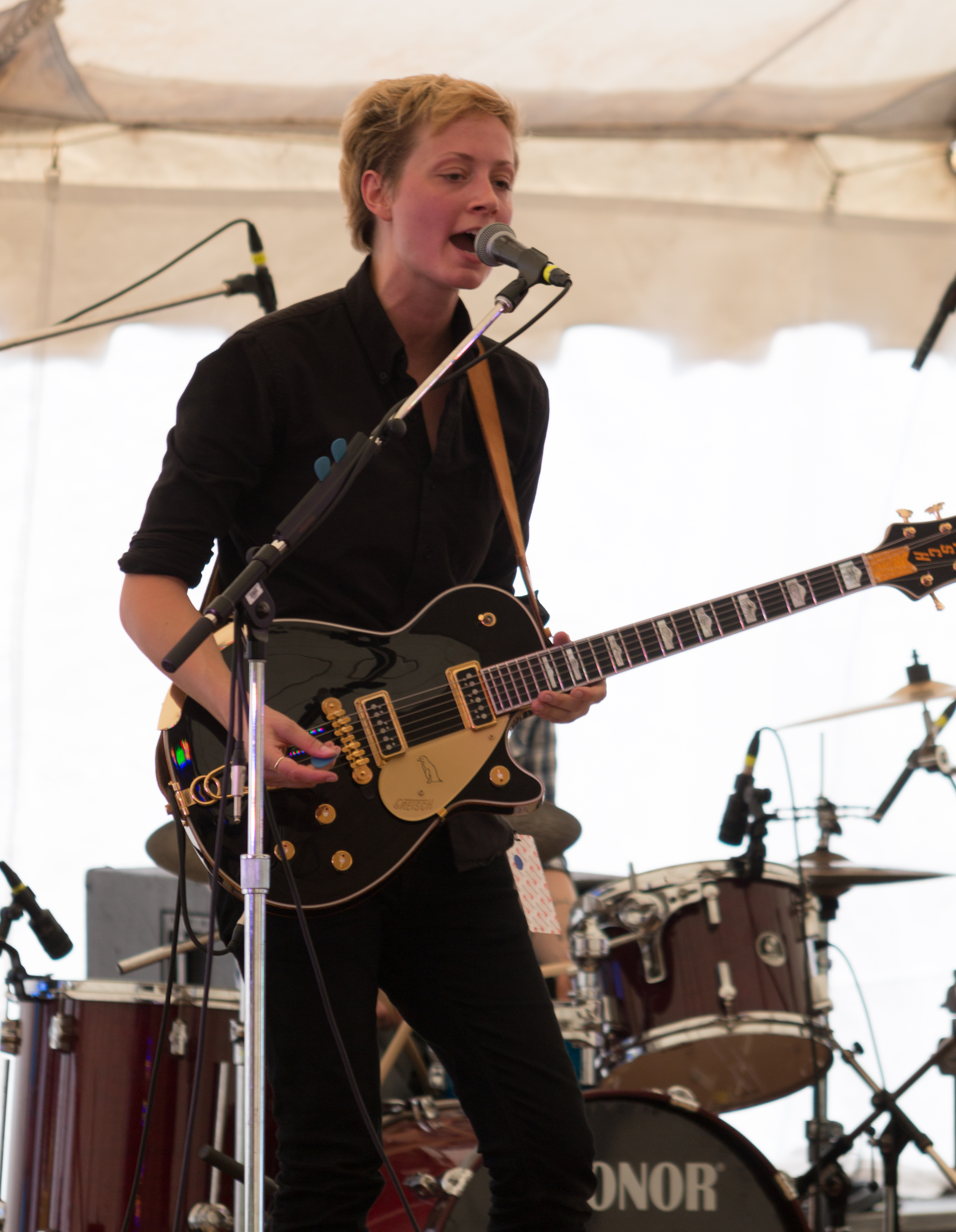
Mo Kenney performing at the 2015 Hillside Festival

In March 2013, the album received an East Coast Music Association award nomination for Rising Star Recording of the Year.

In July 2013, Kenney's song "Sucker" won the SOCAN Songwriting Prize for the best song by an independent Canadian musician, sponsored by the Society of Composers, Authors and Music Publishers of Canada. Also in 2013, Kenney won three Music Nova Scotia awards: pop recording of the year, female artist of the year, and new artist recording of the year. They received a similar designation, new/emerging artist of the year, at the Canadian Folk Music Awards.

The awards for their debut album continued into 2014, when Mo Kenney picked up four ECMA award nominations, winning the award for pop recording of the year. Also in 2014, Mo Kenney was released in England, Ireland, and Germany.

In September 2014, Kenney released their second album, In My Dreams, which was again produced by Joel Plaskett and released by New Scotland Records and Pheromone Recordings. The album delivered Kenney an ECMA award for Pop Recording of the Year for the second straight year. Kenney did a cross-country tour supporting the release of In My Dreams, and went to perform on Joel Plaskett's Park Avenue Sobriety Test tour in the Spring of 2015, both opening for Plaskett and accompanying band on guitar and backing vocals for half of every show on the tour. In My Dreams was released in Ireland, the UK, and Germany in September 2015.

On September 29, 2017, they released their third album, The Details. In April 2019, Kenney released a follow-up single entitled "Ahead of Myself".

In 2021 Kenney released Covers, an album of cover versions of songs by artists such as Patsy Cline, Daniel Romano, Stone Temple Pilots, The Kinks, Guided by Voices, Tom Petty and The Magnetic Fields.

In 2025 Kenney contributed a cover of Plaskett's "Lonely Love" to the Plaskett tribute album Songs from the Gang.

== Discography ==
=== Albums ===
- Mo Kenney (2012)
- In My Dreams (2014)
- The Details (2017)
- Covers (2021)
- From Nowhere (2024)

=== Singles ===
- "Eden" (b/w "The Great Escape") (7-inch vinyl) (2012)
- "Telephones" (2014)
- "Ahead of Myself" (2019)

== Awards and nominations ==
- 2018
  - Nova Scotia Music Award Winner Solo Recording of the Year – "The Details"
  - Nova Scotia Music Award Winner Rock Recording of the Year – "The Details"
  - Nova Scotia Music Award Nomination Recording of the Year – "The Details"
  - Nova Scotia Music Award Nomination Entertainer of the Year
  - The Coast "Best of Halifax" – Best Songwriter (Silver)
  - The Coast "Best of Halifax" – Best Solo Artist (Silver)
  - ECMA Award Winner Solo Recording of the Year - "The Details"
  - ECMA Award Nomination Rock Recording of the Year - "The Details"
- 2016
  - JUNO Nomination Adult Alternative Album of the Year - "In My Dreams"
  - International Acoustic Music Awards Nomination Best Female Artist – In My Dreams"
  - The Coast "Best of Halifax" Award Winner – Best Female Solo Artist
  - ECMA Award Nomination Album of the Year - "In My Dreams"
  - ECMA Award Nomination Solo Recording of the Year - "In My Dreams"
  - ECMA Award Winner Video of the Year - "Telephones"
  - ECMA Award Nomination Fans' Choice Video of the Year - "Telephones"
- 2015
  - The U.S.A. Songwriting Competition 1st Place Winner (Folk) – "I Faked It"
  - Nova Scotia Music Award Winner Recording of the Year – "In My Dreams"
  - Nova Scotia Music Award Winner Pop Recording of the Year – "In My Dreams"
  - Nova Scotia Music Award Winner Solo Recording of the Year – "In My Dreams"
  - Nova Scotia Music Award Winner Music Video of the Year – "Telephones"
  - The Coast "Best of Halifax" Award Winner – Best Female Solo Artist
  - Unsigned Only Songwriting Competition Semi-Finalist – "Telephones"
  - ECMA Award Winner Pop Recording of the Year - In My Dreams
  - ECMA Award Nomination Song of the Year - "Telephones"
  - ECMA Award Nomination Fans' Choice Entertainer of the Year
- 2014
  - The U.S.A. Songwriting Competition Top 20 Honourable Mention Winner - "Sucker"
  - The U.S.A. Songwriting Competition Folk Category Finalist - "Sucker"
  - CBC Shortlist Award Nomination Best Song/Earworm of the Year - "Telephones"
  - ECMA Award Winner Pop Recording of the Year - Mo Kenney
  - ECMA Award Nomination Songwriter of the Year - "Sucker"
  - ECMA Award Nomination Solo Recording of the Year - Mo Kenney
  - ECMA Award Nomination Fan's Choice Entertainer of the Year
  - Music Nova Scotia Award Nomination Entertainer of the Year
- 2013
  - 2013 English SOCAN Songwriting Prize Winner
  - Canadian Folk Music Award Winner New/Emerging Artist of the Year
  - Music Nova Scotia Award Winner New Artist Recording of the Year - Mo Kenney
  - Music Nova Scotia Award Winner Pop Recording of the Year – Mo Kenney
  - Music Nova Scotia Award Winner Female Artist Recording – Mo Kenney
  - Music Nova Scotia Award Nomination SOCAN Songwriter of the Year – "Sucker"
  - ECMA Award Nomination Rising Star Recording of the Year – Mo Kenney
  - Ottawa Folk Festival Supernova Award Winner ** CBC Radio 2 Top 100 Songs of 2013 - "The Great Escape" (#73) and "Sucker" (#34)
- 2012
  - CBC Radio 3 Bucky Award Nomination Rookie of the Year
  - iTunes Best Singer Songwriters of 2012
