= Peter Elkas =

Canadian musician (born 1976)

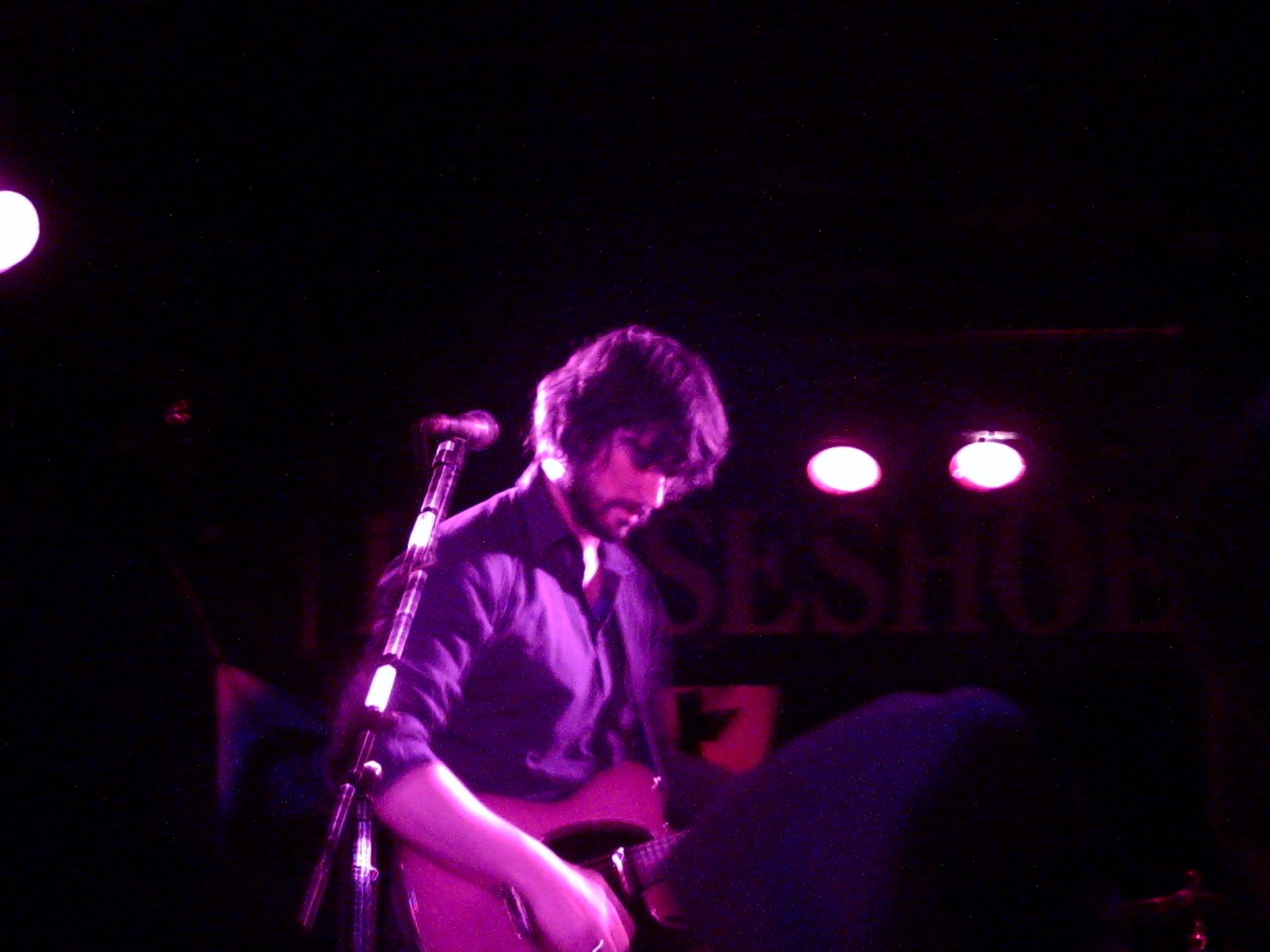
- Elkas performing in 2007

Background information
- Born: July 24, 1976 (age 50)
- Origin: Montreal, Canada
- Genres: Pop, rock
- Occupation: Musician
- Instruments: Vocals; guitar; harmonica; piano
- Labels: New Scotland, MapleMusic
- Member of: Peter Elkas Band
- Formerly of: The Local Rabbits

Peter Elkas (born July 24, 1976) is a Montreal-born Canadian musician. He played with the Local Rabbits from 1990 until 2001, releasing an EP and three studio albums. In 2004, he published his debut solo album, Party of One. He has since released Wall of Fire (2007), Repeat Offender (2011), and the 2018 EP Lion.

== Biography ==
=== The Local Rabbits: 1990–2001 ===
Born in Montreal, Elkas spent twelve years as part of the alternative rock band the Local Rabbits, with whom he began playing as a teenager, in 1990. They released The Super Duper EP in 1993 and followed it with the full-length You Can't Touch This, in 1995. In 1997, they toured North America and performed as Neko Case's backing band on several Lilith Fair dates. Their second studio album, Basic Concept, came out in 1998, and in 2001, the band published their final record, This Is It Here We Go. The Local Rabbits subsequently disbanded, but they briefly reunited in 2007 to record a track for the Rheostatics tribute album The Secret Sessions.

=== Solo work: 2004–present ===
Elkas released his first solo album, Party of One, in 2004. Charlie Sexton produced his 2007 sophomore release, Wall of Fire.

In 2011, Elkas issued his third album, Repeat Offender, which was followed in 2014 by a tenth-anniversary reissue of Party of One.

In 2018, he published the EP Lion, under the name Peter Elkas Band.

In 2025, he contributed a cover of Joel Plaskett's "Beyond, Beyond, Beyond" to the Plaskett tribute album Songs from the Gang.

== Discography ==
=== The Local Rabbits ===
- The Super Duper EP (1993)
- You Can't Touch This (1995)
- Basic Concept (1998)
- This Is It Here We Go (2001)

=== Solo ===
- Party of One (2004)
- Wall of Fire (2007)
- Repeat Offender (2011)
- Lion (EP, as Peter Elkas Band – 2018)
