= Gang of Losers =

Album by The Dears

Studio album by the Dears
- Released: August 29, 2006
- Recorded: Why Can't I Hear Anything, Parc Extension, Montreal
- Genre: Indie rock
- Length: 48:07
- Labels: MapleMusic Recordings; Arts & Crafts; Bella Union (UK)
- Producer: Murray Lightburn

The Dears chronology
Thank You Good Night Sold Out (2004)	Gang of Losers (2006)	Missiles (2008)

Professional ratings
Aggregate scores
Source	Rating
Metacritic	79/100 link
Review scores
Source	Rating
AllMusic	link
Clickmusic	link
The Onion	A link
PopMatters	link
The Observer	link
The Guardian	link
Transform Online	(not rated) link
Tiny Mix Tapes	link
Twisted Ear	link

Gang of Losers is the third full-length album from Montreal band the Dears. It was released on August 29, 2006 in Canada under the Maple Music Recordings label and on October 3, 2006 in the USA under the Arts & Crafts label.

On July 10, 2007, Gang of Losers was announced as a finalist for the 2007 Polaris Music Prize, alongside such other acts as Feist, Junior Boys, and Chad VanGaalen.

== Track listing ==
All songs written by Murray Lightburn.

1. "Sinthtro" – 1:31
2. "Ticket to Immortality" – 4:22
3. "Death or Life We Want You" – 3:19
4. "Hate Then Love" – 4:44
5. "There Goes My Outfit" – 3:46
6. "Bandwagoneers" – 4:40
7. "Fear Made the World Go 'Round" – 3:56
8. "You and I Are a Gang of Losers" – 4:57
9. "Whites Only Party" – 3:10
10. "Ballad of Humankindness" – 4:13
11. "I Fell Deep" – 4:56
12. "Find Our Way to Freedom" – 4:27

The first 10,000 copies included an unlisted bonus track, "The Highest".

The Australian and New Zealand version contained a bonus disc with four tracks, two which were recorded live at Triple J on June 8, 2006.

1. Raise The Dead – 4:03
2. The Highest – 3:45
3. There Goes My Outfit (Acoustic) – 3:52
4. Ticket to Immortality (Acoustic) – 3:43

== Personnel ==
- George Donoso III – drums
- Martin Pelland – bass guitar
- Valerie Jodoin Keaton – synthesizers, orgue, vocals
- Natalia Yanchak – piano, synthesizers, vocals
- Murray Lightburn – composition, vocals, other
- Patrick Krief – electric guitar, additional piano on "Ballad of Humankindness"
- Chris Seligman – French horn on "Sinthro" and "Ballad of Humankindness"
- Rev. William J. Lightburn – tenor saxophone on "Find Our Way to Freedom"
