= Big Black Coat =

Studio album by Junior Boys
- Released: February 5, 2016
- Genre: Synth-pop
- Length: 49:47
- Label: City Slang
- Producer: Junior Boys

Junior Boys chronology
| It's All True (2011) | Big Black Coat (2016) | Kiss Me All Night (2016) |

Singles from Big Black Coat
- 1. "Big Black Coat" Released: October 22, 2015; 2. "Over It" Released: November 18, 2015

Big Black Coat is the fifth studio album by Canadian electronic music duo Junior Boys. The album was released on February 5, 2016 by the group's new home label City Slang. It is the group's first record in five years.

== Background and release ==
Following the 2011 release of their previous album, It's All True, the duo spent several years pursuing solo and side projects, which included Jeremy Greenspan's working on music by Caribou and Jessy Lanza. The group's press release cited Yellow Magic Orchestra, Plastikman, Robert Hood, Dan Bell, and ESP's 1986 proto-house track "It's You" as inspirations for the recording. Describing the genesis of the album's title, Greenspan explained:

All the songs were about the guys that I saw down town who were just lonely and walking around. I wanted to give them a voice and all the songs are about guys who are frustrated with their emotional lives, frustrated by women, frustrated by everything. So the coat became a metaphor and an analogy of a way to insulate yourself away from the harshness of a Canadian winter. It's pretty bleak."

Big Black Coat premiered as a live NPR stream on January 27, 2016.

== Critical reception ==
Professional ratings
Aggregate scores
| Source | Rating |
|---|---|
| AnyDecentMusic? | 7.3/10 |
| Metacritic | 80/100 |
Review scores
| Source | Rating |
| AllMusic | 4.5/5 stars |
| Financial Times | 3/5 stars |
| The Guardian | 4/5 stars |
| The Irish Times | 4/5 stars |
| Mixmag | 9/10 |
| Mojo | 4/5 stars |
| Pitchfork | 8.0/10 |
| Q | 4/5 stars |
| Spin | 7/10 |
| Uncut | 8/10 |

At Metacritic, which assigns a normalized rating out of 100 to reviews from mainstream publications, the album received an average score of 80, indicating "generally favorable reviews". Andy Kellman of AllMusic noted influences from "a pool of old sources, including post-disco, early and raw Chicago house, and the bizarre art-pop of Yellow Magic Orchestra (and graphically from Jesus and Mary Chain's Darklands)" and felt that it "contends with Last Exit as Junior Boys' deepest, most vibrant work." The Guardian's Lanre Bakare complimented the duo's "ability to mix elements smoothly", while Pitchfork's Cameron Cook stated that "it's impressive and frankly unusual to see a band five albums into their career experiment with new sounds and actually make it work, but Junior Boys have pulled it off." Stephen Worthy, writing in Mixmag, called it "their most rounded, consistently engaging record yet", and in a separate review for Mojo, he added that "their reunion album fizzes with energy—although it retains the underlying melancholia that defined their previous work."

While noting that the band's "usual affinity for R&B drags on the album's slower numbers", Gary Suarez of Consequence of Sound wrote that "as they depart from their early combination of synthpop and R&B into harder, accented electronics reminiscent of early Detroit techno, Junior Boys push forward with one of their most liberating releases in a decade — and, best of all, they sound happy doing it." Andrew Unterberger of Spin found the underlying "sexual desperation" in the lyrics to be inconsistent, but nonetheless called Big Black Coat a "surprisingly successful reinvention". PopMatters writer John Bergstrom was mixed in his assessment, remarking that the band sound like they "want to be Pet Shop Boys", but that they "need to work on sharpening up that Canadian wit and maybe using 'baby' a bit more ironically."

== Track listing ==
| No. | Title | Writer(s) | Length |
|---|---|---|---|
| 1. | "You Say That" | Greenspan | 4:56 |
| 2. | "Over It" | Greenspan | 3:45 |
| 3. | "C'mon Baby" | Greenspan | 4:49 |
| 4. | "Baby Give Up on It" | Greenspan | 4:16 |
| 5. | "M & P" | Greenspan; Matt Didemus | 4:20 |
| 6. | "No One's Business" | Greenspan; Didemus | 2:41 |
| 7. | "What You Won't Do for Love" | Bobby Caldwell; Alfons Kettner | 5:04 |
| 8. | "And It's Forever" | Greenspan; Didemus | 5:35 |
| 9. | "Baby Don't Hurt Me" | Greenspan | 2:00 |
| 10. | "Love Is a Fire" | Greenspan; Didemus | 5:09 |
| 11. | "Big Black Coat" | Greenspan; Didemus | 7:12 |
| Total length: | | | 49:47 |

== Personnel ==
Junior Boys

- Matt Didemus – production
- Jeremy Greenspan – production, vocals

Additional personnel

- Mike Jerome – artwork, design
- David Psutka – engineering
- Bob Weston – mastering

== Charts ==
| Chart (2016) | Peak position |
|---|---|
| UK Independent Album Breakers (OCC) | 14 |
| US Heatseekers Albums (Billboard) | 22 |
| US Top Dance Albums (Billboard) | 7 |
