= Missiles (album) =

Studio album by the Dears
- Released: October 20, 2008
- Genre: Indie rock
- Length: 58:16
- Label: Dangerbird Records; MapleMusic Recordings

The Dears chronology
Gang of Losers (2006)	Missiles (2008)	Degeneration Street (2011)

Professional ratings
Aggregate scores
Source	Rating
Metacritic	74/100 link
Review scores
Source	Rating
AbsolutePunk.net	(77%) link
AllMusic	link
Blender	link
ChartAttack	link
The Guardian	4/5 stars
NME	7/10 stars
Pitchfork	(7.3/10) link
Slant Magazine	link
Spin	link
The Toronto Star	link

Missiles is the fourth full-length studio album by Canadian indie rock band the Dears, which was released on October 20, 2008 on Dangerbird Records in the United States and MapleMusic Recordings in Canada.

== Recording ==
The album was marked by creative tensions within the band. By the time the recording process was complete, most of the supporting musicians had left, leaving only core members Murray Lightburn and Natalia Yanchak. Lightburn subsequently selected several other musicians, including members of Pony Up, as a temporary touring band; most of the band's earlier lineup later returned for the 2011 album Degeneration Street.

== Track listing ==
All songs written by Murray Lightburn.
No.	Title	Length
1.	"Disclaimer"	6:44
2.	"Dream Job"	4:32
3.	"Money Babies"	4:16
4.	"Berlin Heart"	4:26
5.	"Lights Off"	8:02
6.	"Crisis 1 & 2"	3:44
7.	"Demons"	5:00
8.	"Missiles"	5:00
9.	"Meltdown in A Major"	5:10
10.	"Saviour"	11:20

== Personnel ==
=== Musicians ===
- George Donoso III - Drums, Background Vocals, Handclaps
- Roberto Arquila - Bass Guitar, Percussion
- Murray Lightburn - Guitar, Bass Guitar, Keyboards, Vocals, Percussion
- Patrick Krief - Guitar, Mellotron, Background Vocals, Percussion
- Robert Benvie - Guitar, Banjo, Snyth, Background Vocals, Percussion
- Adrian Popovich - Guitar
- Natalia Yanchak - Keyboards, Vocals
- Aaron Seligman - Handclaps
- Jonathon Achtman - Handclaps
- Brian Smith - Handclaps
- Jason Thomas - Handclaps, Percussion
- Matt Watkins - Trumpet
- Chris Seligman - French Horn
- Evan Cranley - Trombone
- Jade McNelis - Violin
- Marika - VLNS
- Anthony Shaw - VLNS
- Kristina Koropecki - Cello
- Rev. William Lightburn - Saxophone
- Every Kid Choir: Amethyste Baranes, Samuel Baranes, Amelia Bonter, Esme Steadman-Gantous, Simone Steadman-Gantous, Erika Vigneault, Sinna Mouilin-Creyx, Varnen Pareukan, Abby Gilbert, Maria Gabriela

=== Other Personnel ===
RECORDING:

- Daniel Lagace, Drew Malamud - Studio Plateau, MTL
- Joseph Donovan, Adrian Popovich - Mountain City, MTL
- Jace Lasek - Breakglass, MTL

MIXING:

- Roberto Arquila, Murray Lightburn, Drew Malamud - Hotel 2 Tango, MTL

MASTERING:

- Bob Ludwig - Gateway Mastering, Portland, ME

Artwork:

- Edward Maloney

A&R: Jeff Castelaz and Peter Walker
MANAGEMENT: Dangerbird
LEGALMENT: Craig Averill, Esq.
