= Nor the Dahlias: The Dears 1995–1998 =

Nor the Dahlias: The Dears 1995-1998

Compilation album by The Dears
- Released: 2002
- Genre: Indie rock
- Label: Grenadine Records

The Dears chronology
Orchestral Pop Noir Romantique (2001)	Nor the Dahlias: The Dears 1995-1998 (2002)	Protest (2002)

Professional ratings
Review scores
Source	Rating
Allmusic	link

Nor the Dahlias: The Dears 1995–1998 is an album by The Dears, released in 2001. The album is a compilation of early tracks by the band preceding their debut release, End of a Hollywood Bedtime Story.

The tracks are strongly reminiscent of singer and songwriter Murray Lightburn's musical influences, including The Smiths and Blur, and do not display the distinctive style of the band's later albums.

== Track listing ==
1. "Everlasting" – 4:38
2. "Open Arms" – 2:52
3. "Nine Eight Two" – 3:38
4. "The Way the World Treats You" – 3:30
5. "Can't Remember Anything Else" – 3:25
6. "Mute Button" – 4:15
7. "Dear Mr. Pop Star" – 3:37
8. "Corduroy Boy" – 3:39
9. "She's Well Aware" – 2:38
10. "Nor the Dahlias" – 3:00
