= The Great Pacific Ocean (EP) =

EP by Thrush Hermit
- Released: 1995
- Studios: Chicago, Illinois
- Genre: Indie rock
- Label: Murderecords
- Producer: Steve Albini

Thrush Hermit chronology
Smart Bomb (1994)	The Great Pacific Ocean (1995)	Rock and Roll Detective (1997)

The Great Pacific Ocean is the second EP by Canadian rock band Thrush Hermit, released in 1995 on CD and 12" picture disc by Murderecords. It was recorded in Chicago with Steve Albini.

Following the EP's release, the band signed with Elektra Entertainment in 1996, which issued their first full-length album, Sweet Homewrecker, in 1997.

== Reception ==
AllMusic described the EP as a short but appealing release, comparing it to the work of Pavement, Guided by Voices and Sebadoh while noting that it retained an identity of its own.

== Track listing ==
1. "The Great Pacific Ocean"
2. "Every Morning I Reread the Postcards"
3. "25 All Right"
4. "Patriot"
5. "Claim to Lame"
6. "The Great Pacific Ocean (Reprise)"

== Personnel ==
- Joel Plaskett – vocals, guitar
- Rob Benvie – guitar, vocals
- Ian McGettigan – bass
- Cliff Gibb – drums
- Steve Albini – recording, mixing
