= Lovers Rock (disambiguation) =

Lovers rock is a style of reggae music.

Lovers Rock may also refer to:

- Lovers Rock (2020 film), directed by Steve McQueen from the anthology series Small Axe
- Lovers' Rock (1964 film), Taiwanese film
- Lovers Rock (Sade album), 2000
- Lovers Rock (Estelle album), 2018
- Lovers Rock (The Dears album), 2020
- "Lover's Rock", a song by The Clash from the album London Calling, 1979
- "Lovers Rock", a song by Sublime with Rome from the album Yours Truly, 2011
- "Lovers Rock", a song by TV Girl from the album French Exit, 2014

== See also ==
- Lovers' Stone, a rock formation near Bowen Road in Hong Kong
