= Love Hallucination =

Studio album by Jessy Lanza
- Released: July 28, 2023
- Genre: Electro-pop
- Length: 37:51
- Language: English
- Label: Hyperdub
- Producers: Jacques Greene; Jeremy Greenspan; David Kennedy; Marco "Tensnake" Niermeski; Paul White

Jessy Lanza chronology
All the Time (2020)	Love Hallucination (2023)

"I think a lot of the bravado of LA, and the confidence it takes to be a part of it, I think that definitely shows up in this record. I think that's such bullshit that people are relaxed in LA [When that car nearly ploughed into me] I definitely felt a physical manifestation of the 'Fuck you, get out of my way' attitude that can permeate parts of Los Angeles."

— Jessy Lanza on themes on this album and life in California.

Love Hallucination is the fourth studio album by Canadian singer, songwriter, and multi-instrumentalist electronic musician Jessy Lanza, released by Hyperdub on July 28, 2023. The recording was inspired by Lanza's move from the San Francisco Bay Area to Los Angeles and has received positive reviews from critics.

== Recording and release ==
Lanza previewed this album with the singles "Don't Leave Me Now", "Midnight Ontario", and "Limbo" and promoted it with a concert tour. Lanza also built a home studio to record this music.

== Reception ==
According to the review aggregator Metacritic, Love Hallucination received "generally favorable reviews" based on a weighted average score of 79 out of 100 from eleven critic scores.

Editors at AllMusic rated this album 4 out of 5 stars, with critic Andy Kellman writing, "While Lanza has never come across as diffident, she is at her most poised and direct on Love Hallucination, another serving of bubbly avant-pop only she could have made. The range of sounds and emotions is a little greater here." Editors at Bandcamp chose this for Album of the Day and critic April Clare Walsh praised Lanza for "chart[ing] some unfamiliar territory on her endorphin-filled fourth album", with music that "is underscored by Lanza's crystal-clear sense of self-awareness, giving the impression that she knows not just how to have a laugh but how to laugh at herself". Noah Ciubotaru of Exclaim! rated this album 8 out of 10, summing up, "her vocals split into spectral trails and drift toward each corner of the mix; it fills out to become one gauzy swath, and as she repeats those lines, the music—so sensual, so resplendent—responds to that desire for something all-encompassing. Every night. All the time. Like tears in rain." The Line of Best Fit's Emma Way gave this album an 8 out of 10, praising how personal it is and writing that the listening experience "feels like an artist riding on intuition". NPR's Harry Tafoya noted Lanza's ability to mix emotions: "it's to her credit that even at her most neurotic she allows the music to speak for itself while remaining dazzlingly open to possibility". Pitchfork shortlisted this as one of the seven albums to listen to the week it was released and critic Eric Torres rated it a 7.9 out of 10 for mixing uncertainty with boldness for an "eclectic, bolder approach, [which is] a slight pivot that rewards in full". Paul Attard of Slant Magazine rated Love Hallucination 2.5 out of 5 stars for being too long and writes that a sense of "in one ear and out the other" sets in by the end of the listening experience.

Writing for Clash Music, Joe Rivers scored this album an 8 out of 10, calling it "intimate yet complex electronic pop" that "further evidence" that Lanza is one of Hyperdub's "strongest artists, and also one of the most consistent creators of the past ten years". Ludovic Hunter-Tilney of Financial Times rated Love Hallucination 3 out of 5 stars, writing that the music "at times... gets a bit too immersive" and continues that "its sense of musical intimacy is well-worked". In The Guardian, Laura Snapes gave this release 4 out of 5 stars and praised Lanza's songwriting for being bold and incorporating humor in her lyrics. Writing for The Irish Times, Tony Clayton-Lea rated this release 3 out of 5 stars, characterizing it as "music that will surely soundtrack the clinking of cocktail glasses throughout the next couple of months". Ben Hogwood of musicOMH gave Love Hallucination 4 out of 5 stars and characterized the work as "a fine and often beautiful album, full of sensual delights and productions that vary from wafer-thin to chocolate rich" that is emotionally accessible for listeners in spite of being so personal about Lanza's experience. In NME, Ben Jolley gave Love Hallucination the same score and calls this a "sonic evolution" of Lanza's musicianship. At The Quietus, Skye Butchard summed up her review writing "in staying true to her appeal as she explores new sides of herself, she's sounding as fresh as ever" and editors chose this as one of the best albums of June and July 2023. Editors of Resident Advisor chose this as a recommended album and critic Sophie McNulty called this "her tightest, catchiest and somehow most personal record yet" and wrote that she mixes "feel-good" pop with "a welcome dose of self-awareness". Editors of Rolling Stone UK named this as one of seven albums to listen to the week it was released, with a brief review writing that it "explores sensuality and desire though the prisms of irresistible melody, beguiling instrumental choices and, frequentlly, knowingly witty lyrics". Lewis Wade of The Skinny wrote that this release has "subtle production flourishes continue to inform Jessy Lanza's glistening pop exterior" and gave it 4 out of 5 stars. In The Sydney Morning Herald, Annabel Ross rated this release 3 out of 5 stars, writing that the "music is wispy and candy-toned like fairy floss, while lyrically, Lanza delves into rather less sweet topics, but it's a juxtaposition that can lose its impact with repetition" and stating that it is an effective choice for Lanza.

Gorilla vs. Bear rated this the 14th best album of 2023. Editors at Pitchfork included this in a list of the best electronic music of 2023. Editors at Clash Music listed this the 30th best albums of the year. Editors at AllMusic included this on their list of favorite electronic albums of 2023.

== Track listing ==
All lyrics written by Jessy Lanza.

Love Hallucination track listing
No.	Title	Music	Length
1.	"Don't Leave Me Now"	Lanza	2:57
2.	"Midnight Ontario"	Jacques Greene; Jessy Lanza	3:06
3.	"Limbo"	Lanza; Marco Niemerski	3:23
4.	"Casino Niagara"	Jeremy Greenspan; Lanza	4:02
5.	"Don't Cry on My Pillow"	Greenspan; Lanza	3:24
6.	"Big Pink Rose"	Greenspan; Lanza	3:29
7.	"Drive"	Greenspan; Lanza	3:36
8.	"I Hate Myself"	Greenspan; Lanza	3:13
9.	"Gossamer"	Greenspan; Lanza	4:37
10.	"Marathon"	Lanza; Paul White	3:15
11.	"Double Time"	Greenspan; Lanza	2:47
Total length:			37:51

== Personnel ==
- Jessy Lanza – instrumentation, vocals, engineering, production
- Winston Case – artwork, art direction
- Jacques Greene – additional synthesizer on "Midnight Ontario", engineering on "Midnight Ontario", production on "Midnight Ontario"
- Jeremy Greenspan – engineering on "Casino Niagara", "Don't Cry On My Pillow", "Big Pink Rose", "Drive", "I Hate Myself", "Gossamer", and "Double Time"; mixing on "Casino Niagara", "Don't Cry On My Pillow", "Big Pink Rose", "Drive", "I Hate Myself", "Gossamer", and "Double Time"; production on "Casino Niagara", "Don't Cry On My Pillow", "Big Pink Rose", "Drive", "I Hate Myself", "Gossamer", and "Double Time"
- David Kennedy – arrangement on "Marathon"; mixing on "Midnight Ontario", "Limbo", and "Marathon"; additional production on "Don't Leave Me Now", "Midnight Ontario", "Limbo", and "Marathon"
- Marco "Tensnake" Niermeski – engineering on "Limbo", production on "Limbo"
- Plusminus Studio – graphic design
- Bob Weston – mastering at Chicago Mastering Service
- Paul White – engineering on "Marathon", production on "Marathon"
- David Wrench – mixing on "Don't Leave Me Now", additional programming on "Don't Leave Me Now"
- Landon Yost – photography

== See also ==
- 2023 in American music
- List of 2023 albums
