= No Cities Left =

Studio album by The Dears
- Released: April 15, 2003
- Recorded: April 2002–2003
- Genres: Indie rock, baroque pop
- Length: 62:51
- Label: MapleMusic Recordings
- Producer: Murray Lightburn

The Dears chronology
Protest (2002)	No Cities Left (2003)	Thank You Good Night Sold Out (2004)

Singles from No Cities Left
- 1. "We Can Have It" / "Summer of Protest" Released: 16 August 2004; 2. "Lost in the Plot" Released: 8 November 2004; 3. "22: The Death of All the Romance" Released: 2 May 2005

Alternative cover
- US release cover

Professional ratings
Aggregate scores
Source	Rating
Metacritic	79/100
Review scores
Source	Rating
AllMusic	4/5 stars
Pitchfork	6.8/10
The Guardian	4/5 stars
Drowned in Sound	7/10
The A.V. Club	C+

No Cities Left is the second album by Canadian band The Dears, released in 2003 on MapleMusic Recordings. The album features fellow Canadian indie-rocker Sam Roberts playing violin on "Never Destroy Us".

== Track listing ==
All songs written by Murray Lightburn.

1. "We Can Have It" – 5:42
2. "Who Are You, Defenders of the Universe?" – 3:41
3. "Lost in the Plot" – 4:48
4. "The Second Part" – 5:42
5. "Don't Lose the Faith" – 3:10
6. "Expect the Worst/'Cos She's a Tourist" – 7:52
7. "Pinned Together, Falling Apart" – 6:01
8. "Never Destroy Us" – 4:29
9. "Warm and Sunny Days" – 5:47
10. "22: The Death of All the Romance" – 5:56
11. "Postcard from Purgatory" – 7:57
12. "No Cities Left" – 5:23

"Don't Lose the Faith" was omitted from the original American release.

== Re-releases ==
The 2005 re-release of No Cities Left included "Don't Lose the Faith" and also the content of their EP Protest.

In 2024, a 20th anniversary edition of the album was released, featuring six extra tracks of demos and acoustic versions. The reissue was promoted in part with a series of full-album concerts in Montreal, Toronto, and Hamilton. During the Montreal show at the Rialto Theatre, Murray Lightburn was spontaneously moved to tell the audience that life—despite its hardships—is fundamentally beautiful. After he asked the crowd to chant "Life is beautiful!" back to him three times, the moment inspired the title and themes of the band's 2025 album, Life Is Beautiful! Life Is Beautiful! Life Is Beautiful!

== Videos ==
Videos were released for "Lost in the Plot" and "22: The Death of All the Romance".

== Personnel ==
- Murray Lightburn - Lead and background vocals, electric and acoustic guitar, Fender Rhodes, piano, melodica, midi programming, tambourine, maracas, handclaps
- Natalia Yanchak - NordElectro organ and clavinet, piano, synthesizers, Fender Rhodes, lead and background vocals, handclaps
- Martin Pelland - Bass guitar, background vocals, handclaps
- George Donoso III - Drums, background vocals, handclaps
- Valerie Jodoin-Keaton - background vocals, handclaps
- Sam Roberts - Violin
- Heather Schnarr - Violin
- Matthew Perrin - Double Bass
- Josh Fuhrman - Tenor Saxophone, baritone saxophone
- Brigitte Mayes - Cello, synthesizers, Fender Rhodes, flute, background vocals, handclaps
- The Brebeuf Brass : Matthew Watkins (trumpet), Chris Seligman (French horn) and Evan Cranley (Euphonium, trombone)
