= Oh No (Jessy Lanza album) =

Studio album by Jessy Lanza
- Released: May 13, 2016
- Genre: Electronic; alternative R&B; technopop
- Length: 40:50
- Label: Hyperdub
- Producer: Jessy Lanza; Jeremy Greenspan

Jessy Lanza chronology
Pull My Hair Back (2013)	Oh No (2016)	All the Time (2020)

Oh No is the second album by Canadian musician Jessy Lanza. It was released on May 13, 2016, by Hyperdub. The album features co-production from Junior Boys' Jeremy Greenspan and was preceded by the singles "It Means I Love You" and "VV Violence".

== Critical reception ==
Oh No received a Metacritic score of 82 out of 100, indicating "universal acclaim". Rob Arcand of Tiny Mix Tapes emphasizes the importance of footwork to the album, and refers to it as a "joyous, envious, celebratory collapse" that "vaults across an infinity of cultural milieus to find itself." Writing for Resident Advisor, Matt McDermott was favorable to the album overall but said that it "falls short of Lanza's own standards." For AllMusic, Andy Kellman praised Lanza's "zest," compared the title track to "Oops (Oh My)", and expressed that the album combined techno-pop, juke, boogie and electro.

Professional ratings
Aggregate scores
Source	Rating
AnyDecentMusic?	7.7/10
Metacritic	82/100
Review scores
Source	Rating
AllMusic	4.5/5 stars
Exclaim!	9/10
The Guardian	4/5 stars
Mixmag	9/10
NME	4/5
Pitchfork	7.9/10
Q	4/5 stars
Resident Advisor	3.8/5
Spin	8/10
Uncut	8/10

=== Accolades ===
The track "It Means I Love You" was named Best Song of 2016 by Gorilla vs. Bear.

Publication	Accolade	Year	Rank	Ref.
Gorilla vs. Bear	Albums of the Year 2016	2016	2	
The Vinyl Factory	Albums of the Year 2016	2016	4	
The Quietus	Albums of the Year 2016	2016	4	
Fact	Albums of the Year 2016	2016	11	

== Track listing ==
All tracks are written by Jessy Lanza and Jeremy Greenspan

No.	Title	Length
1.	"New Ogi"	2:23
2.	"VV Violence"	3:57
3.	"Never Enough"	4:24
4.	"I Talk BB"	4:07
5.	"Going Somewhere"	4:38
6.	"It Means I Love You"	4:41
7.	"Vivica"	4:04
8.	"Oh No"	4:41
9.	"Begins"	4:07
10.	"Could Be U"	3:43
Total length:		40:50

== Charts ==
Chart (2016)	Peak position
US Top Dance/Electronic Albums (Billboard)	14
