= 2007 Polaris Music Prize =

Annual Canadian music award

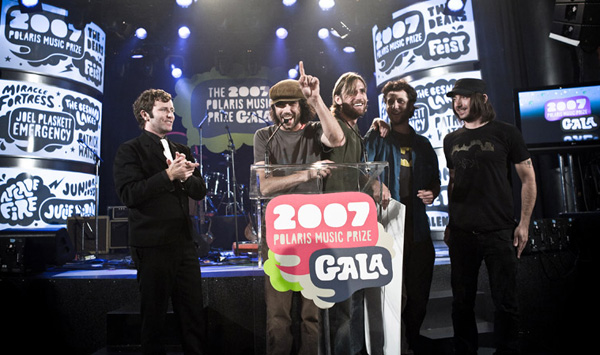
Patrick Watson at the 2007 Polaris Music Prize gala

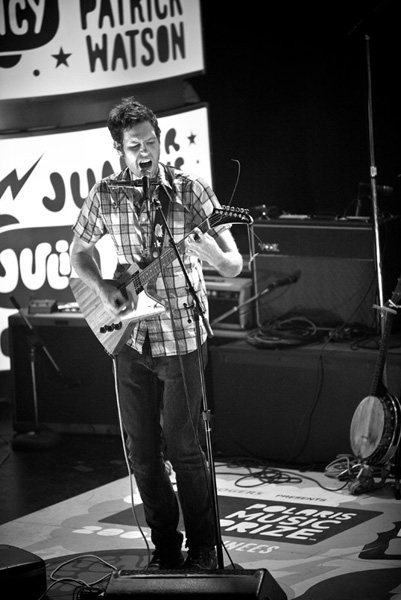
Chad VanGaalen at the 2007 Polaris Music Prize gala

The 2007 edition of the Canadian Polaris Music Prize was presented on September 24, 2007, at the Phoenix Concert Theatre in Toronto.

The winning album was Patrick Watson's Close to Paradise.

According to CBC News, "finalists were drawn from submissions by more than 170 music journalists, reviewers and broadcasters across Canada."

== Nominees ==
The prize's 10-album shortlist was announced on July 10.

- Patrick Watson, Close to Paradise
- Arcade Fire, Neon Bible
- The Besnard Lakes, The Besnard Lakes Are the Dark Horse
- The Dears, Gang of Losers
- Julie Doiron, Woke Myself Up
- Feist, The Reminder
- Junior Boys, So This Is Goodbye
- Miracle Fortress, Five Roses
- Joel Plaskett Emergency, Ashtray Rock
- Chad VanGaalen, Skelliconnection

== Album ==
2007 Polaris Music Prize

Compilation album by various artists
- Released: 2007
- Genre: Pop

Various artists chronology
2006 Polaris Music Prize (2006)	2007 Polaris Music Prize (2007)

As in 2006, a compilation album was released to promote the nominees. The album did not, however, include a track by Arcade Fire—although media initially reported that the Polaris committee had snubbed the band by excluding them, the committee and the band issued a joint press release confirming that the band chose not to have a track included on the album as they prefer not to participate in compilation albums.

=== Track listing ===
1. "Devastation" (The Besnard Lakes)
2. "Hate Then Love" (The Dears)
3. "No More" (Julie Doiron)
4. "Sealion" (Feist)
5. "In the Morning" (Junior Boys)
6. "Have You Seen in Your Dreams" (Miracle Fortress)
7. "Fashionable People" (Joel Plaskett Emergency)
8. "Sing Me 2 Sleep" (Chad VanGaalen)
9. "Drifters" (Patrick Watson)
