= Hermit Thrush (disambiguation) =

The hermit thrush is a bird native to North America. Hermit Thrush may also refer to:

- Hermit Thrush (band), an American folk band active in the mid 1990s whose members later formed the band Dispatch
- Thrush Hermit, a Canadian alternative rock band active in the 1990s
