= Ian McGettigan =

Canadian musician and producer

- Born: Newfoundland
- Origin: Halifax, Nova Scotia, Canada
- Genre: Indie rock
- Occupations: Producer, Musician
- Instruments: Bass, vocals
- Years active: 1992–present
- Labels: Elektra Records, Sonic Unyon Records

Ian McGettigan is a Canadian rock musician and producer. He was the bassist and a singer and songwriter for Thrush Hermit.

== Career ==
McGettigan toured through Canada and the United States with Thrush Hermit. The band released two EPs on Murderecords, Smart Bomb and Great Pacific Ocean. They signed to the American label Elektra Records and released their full length Sweet Homewrecker. Their 1999 album Clayton Park, on Sonic Unyon Records, was their most successful album, both critically and commercially.

Following Thrush Hermit's break-up, McGettigan produced and contributed to a number of acts and projects, including Joel Plaskett Emergency, Peter Elkas, Jewish Legend, and Two Hours Traffic.

McGettigan recorded and performed with Thrush Hermit's Rob Benvie in the band Camouflage Nights. The band played at a number of festivals. Their debut album, some of which was recorded as early as 2004, includes musical contributions by Buck 65, Feist, and Matt Murphy. Although recording wrapped up in 2008, it was not released until 2012.
