= Pull My Hair Back =

Studio album by Jessy Lanza
- Released: September 9, 2013
- Genre: Alternative R&B; synthpop; downtempo
- Length: 36:16
- Label: Hyperdub
- Producer: Jessy Lanza; Jeremy Greenspan

Jessy Lanza chronology
Pull My Hair Back (2013)	Oh No (2016)

Pull My Hair Back is the debut album by Canadian musician Jessy Lanza.

== Critical reception ==
Pull My Hair Back has a score of 79 out of 100 on Metacritic, indicating "generally favorable reviews". In a review for Resident Advisor, Derek Miller referred to it as "seemingly effortless" and "almost skeletal", with an "incredible spaciousness" and "soothing" vocals, ultimately recommending it as "certainly one of the year's best debuts". Tim Gentles agreed, writing for XLR8R that it was "one of the strongest debuts of the year", praising Lanza's "almost weightless" voice and the album's overall sense of balance and restraint. Jamieson Cox also praised the restraint in a review for Pitchfork, although he expressed interest in what would happen if she "unleashed the considerable chops that occasionally shine".

Professional ratings
Aggregate scores
Source	Rating
Metacritic	79/100
Review scores
Source	Rating
AllMusic	4/5 stars
Exclaim!	8/10
The Guardian	4/5 stars
The Irish Times	4/5 stars
NME	7/10
Pitchfork	7.3/10
Q	4/5 stars
Resident Advisor	4.5/5
Uncut	8/10
XLR8R	8/10

=== Accolades ===
Pull My Hair Back was a shortlisted nominee for the 2014 Polaris Music Prize. It also placed fourth on Resident Advisor's Top 20 albums of 2013.

== Track list ==
Pull My Hair Back track listing
No.	Title	Length
1.	"Giddy"	3:23
2.	"5785021"	4:40
3.	"Kathy Lee"	4:09
4.	"Fuck Diamond"	4:18
5.	"Keep Moving"	3:45
6.	"Against the Wall"	3:12
7.	"Pull My Hair Back"	3:52
8.	"As If"	4:16
9.	"Strange Emotion"	4:43
