= Camouflage Nights =

Canadian electronic rock band

- Origin: Toronto, Ontario, Canada
- Genres: Electronic rock, indie rock
- Years active: 2005-present
- Spinoff of: Thrush Hermit
- Members: Rob Benvie; Ian McGettigan

Camouflage Nights is a Canadian electronic rock band from Toronto fronted by Rob Benvie and Ian McGettigan.

== History ==
Benvie and McGettigan had worked together in the Halifax indie band Thrush Hermit. After Thrush Hermit disbanded in 1999, the two started Camouflage Nights as their own project. The two were backed up by a variety of musicians, including Nobu Adilman.

Camouflage Nights performed at music events in Canada and the US, including the CMJ Music Festival in New York in 2005, the Pop Montreal festival in 2007, and as part of Canada Music Week in Toronto in 2008.

After a string of tour dates and limited releases, including the single "It Could Be Love (Make Mine)", the band's self-titled debut LP — long delayed due to label complications — was released by Sonic Unyon Records in April 2012. The album's material, dating back to 2004, includes contributions by Buck 65, Feist, and Matt Murphy. The album received mixed reviews.

Camouflage Nights has remixed artists such as Stars, Every Move a Picture, Pony Da Look.

== See also ==
- Music of Canada
- Canadian rock
- List of bands from Canada
- List of Canadian musicians
- Category:Canadian musical groups
