= The Dead Horse EP =

EP by Junior Boys
- Released: April 10, 2007
- Genre: Electronic dance music
- Length: 39:40
- Label: Domino

Junior Boys chronology
So This Is Goodbye (2006)	The Dead Horse EP (2007)	Begone Dull Care (2009)

Professional ratings
Review scores
Source	Rating
Pitchfork Media	(8.0/10)

The Dead Horse EP is a remix EP by Junior Boys containing remixes of tracks from their 2006 album So This Is Goodbye. It was released on April 10, 2007, and includes remixes by Hot Chip, Tensnake, Carl Craig, Kode9 and Marsen Jules.

== Track listing ==
1. "In the Morning (Hot Chip remix)" (Junior Boys, Andi Toma) – 9:45
2. "FM (Tensnake remix)" (Junior Boys) – 7:18
3. "Like a Child (Carl Craig remix)" (Junior Boys) – 10:39
4. "Double Shadow (Kode 9 remix)" (Junior Boys) – 6:29
5. "FM (Marsen Jules remix)" (Junior Boys) – 5:16
