= All the Time (Jessy Lanza album) =

Studio album by Jessy Lanza
- Released: July 24, 2020
- Genres: Pop; electronic
- Length: 38:50
- Label: Hyperdub
- Producers: Jeremy Greenspan; Jessy Lanza

Jessy Lanza chronology
| Oh No (2016) | All the Time (2020) | Love Hallucination (2023) |

Singles from All the Time
- 1. "Lick in Heaven" Released: February 20, 2020; 2. "Face" Released: April 27, 2020; 3. "Anyone Around" Released: July 9, 2020

All the Time is the third studio album by Canadian musician Jessy Lanza. It was released through Hyperdub on July 24, 2020.

== Release ==
The album's first single "Lick in Heaven" was released on February 20, 2020. The second single "Face" was released on April 27, 2020. The third single "Anyone Around" was released on July 9, 2020.

== Critical reception ==
Professional ratings
Aggregate scores
| Source | Rating |
|---|---|
| Metacritic | 82/100 |
Review scores
| Source | Rating |
| AllMusic | 4/5 stars |
| Clash | 8/10 |
| Exclaim! | 8/10 |
| The Guardian | 4/5 stars |
| The Line of Best Fit | 8/10 |
| Mojo | 4/5 stars |
| musicOMH | 4/5 stars |
| PopMatters | 9/10 |
| Pitchfork | 7.8/10 |
| Q | 4/5 stars |

All the Time has a score of 82 out of 100 on Metacritic, indicating "universal acclaim", based on 13 reviews. Jay Singh of The Line of Best Fit reviewed the album, stating "All The Time is a full embrace of the 'outsider popstar' [Lanza] was once labelled as." Anna Gaca of Pitchfork said "All the Time is sincere so it doesn’t have to be deep—merely an invitation to look beneath the surface."

== Track listing ==
Credits are adapted from Apple Music.

| No. | Title | Length |
|---|---|---|
| 1. | "Anyone Around" | 2:49 |
| 2. | "Lick in Heaven" | 4:29 |
| 3. | "Face" | 3:21 |
| 4. | "Badly" | 4:24 |
| 5. | "Alexander" | 4:01 |
| 6. | "Ice Creamy" | 3:41 |
| 7. | "Like Fire" | 3:01 |
| 8. | "Baby Love" | 3:37 |
| 9. | "Over and Over" | 4:38 |
| 10. | "All the Time" | 4:49 |
| Total length: | | 38:50 |
