= Life Is Beautiful! Life Is Beautiful! Life Is Beautiful! =

Studio album by the Dears
- Released: November 7, 2025
- Studio: Hotel2Tango
- Genre: Indie rock
- Length: 42 minutes
- Label: Next Door Records
- Producer: Murray Lightburn

The Dears chronology
Lovers Rock (2020)	Life Is Beautiful! Life Is Beautiful! Life Is Beautiful! (2025)

Life Is Beautiful! Life Is Beautiful! Life Is Beautiful! is the ninth studio album by Canadian indie rock band the Dears, released November 7, 2025, on Next Door Records.

Prior to the album's release, "Babe, We'll Find a Way" was released in June 2025 as its lead single.

== Production ==
The album's title derives from the band's concert at the Rialto Theatre in September 2024, marking the 20th anniversary of their influential album No Cities Left. During the performance, bandleader Murray Lightburn says, “I was on stage surrounded by wonderful musicians, playing songs I wrote in my 20s. My kids and my mom were sitting up on the balcony of the theatre. Natalia was just to my right. I told the audience that sometimes it gets tough, but that life is beautiful. I asked the audience to say it with me, three times: A mantra; a wish; an affirmation.”

Lightburn also told Dave MacIntyre of Cult MTL that "people these days are quite mired in the troubles of the world. We're bombarded with this. It’s part of our algorithms. When I'm out in the world and interacting with people, my take is that the glass is half full, not half empty. If you just lived your entire life on the internet, you would think that everybody is angry all the time. It's big business to be a rage farmer. The more we push back against darkness, the more light we will see and feel. This album is absolutely a manifestation of that."

The album was recorded at Hotel2Tango in Montreal, with most of the songs coming together in just two days. Despite this, Lightburn felt that none of the songs were right to be the lead track, until he pulled out "Gotta Get My Head Right", a song he had begun writing in 2012 but had left unfinished until the Life Is Beautiful sessions.

== Critical reception ==
Many critics noted that the album's sound and subject matter represented a significant departure from the band's typical embrace of dark, pessimistic and sometimes apocalyptic themes.

For Next, Felix Hughes called the album "a life-affirming celebration that lives up to the beautiful part of its title. It’s an album that makes you wonder where such an optimistic sound has been for the band all this time. A few missteps don’t take away from what is also highlighted by Lightburn’s smooth vocals that more than meet the occasion, suggesting further bright things as The Dears open up a new dawn in their career."

Patrick Gill of PopMatters wrote that "Those familiar with the Dears’ work will be taken aback by the complexity of their compositions and the diverse sources of inspiration. 'Doom Pays' applies a 1970s glam rock flair that sounds nothing like the band have ever recorded. They routinely use strings, but this record employs horns with equal fervor. The infectious 'Deep in My Heart' features a pulsating groove that evokes the sound of Fleetwood Mac. Considering the addition of horns, it brings a rhythm one might expect from Dave Matthews Band, something wholly unconventional in this universe. Opener “Gotta Get My Head Right” even showcases multiple parts, meaning their more comfortable Morrissey inclinations ('Dead Contacts') now feel foreign."

== Track listing ==
Life Is Beautiful! Life Is Beautiful! Life Is Beautiful! track listing
No.	Title	Length
1.	"Gotta Get My Head Right"	4:45
2.	"Babe, We'll Find a Way"	3:44
3.	"Doom Pays"	3:06
4.	"Deep in My Heart"	3:00
5.	"This Is How We Make Our Dreams Come True"	4:24
6.	"Dead Contacts"	3:47
7.	"Our Life"	4:54
8.	"Tears of a Nation"	3:36
9.	"Tomorrow and Tomorrow"	3:11
10.	"Life Is Beautiful!"	3:34
11.	"Don't Go"	4:06
