= Degeneration Street =

Studio album by the Dears
- Released: February 15, 2011
- Genre: Indie rock
- Length: 59:16
- Labels: Dangerbird; Pheromone

The Dears chronology
Missiles (2008)	Degeneration Street (2011)	Times Infinity Volume One (2015)

Degeneration Street is the fifth studio album by the Dears, released February 15, 2011 on Dangerbird Records in the United States and Pheromone Recordings in Canada.

The album marks the return of several band members who were absent from the band's previous album Missiles, including Patrick Krief, Rob Benvie and Roberto Arquila. Advance promotion for the album included shows in both Montreal and Toronto in which the band played the album in its entirety.

The album was named as a longlisted nominee for the 2011 Polaris Music Prize.

== Track listing ==
1. "Omega Dog" - 5:01
2. "5 Chords" - 3:34
3. "Blood" - 4:09
4. "Thrones" - 4:33
5. "Lamentation" - 4:20
6. "Torches" - 1:36
7. "Galactic Tides" - 4:38
8. "Yesteryear" - 3:51
9. "Stick With Me Kid" - 3:28
10. "Tiny Man" - 5:04
11. "Easy Suffering" - 4:33
12. "Unsung" - 4:15
13. "1854" - 5:23
14. "Degeneration Street" - 4:57

== Personnel ==
- Written/Arranged/Performed by The Dears

The Dears

- Murray Lightburn – Vocals, Guitars, Other
- Natalia Yanchak – Keyboards, Vocals
- Rob Benvie – Guitars, Keyboards, Vocals
- Patrick Krief – Guitars, Vocals
- Robert Arquilla – Bass Guitars, Vocals
- Jeff Luciani – Drums, Percussion

Other Musicians

- Mélanie Bélair - Violin
- Bojana Milinov - Viola
- François Pilon - Violin
- Sheila Hannigan - Cello
- Chris Seligman - French Horn
- Evan Cranley - Trombone
- Liam O'Neil - Baritone Saxophone
- Maia Davies + Anna Ruddick - "Ooh/Aahs"

Other Personnel

- Production/Mastering - Tony Hoffer
- Sound Factory Studio B, Hollywood, CA
- Assistance - Cameron Lister
- Mastering - "Big Bass" Brian Gardener
- Bernie Grundman Mastering, Hollywood, CA
- Assistance - Marie Lewis
- Recording - David Shiffman
- Studio Mixart, Montreal, QC, Canada
- Assistance - Pierre-Philippe Boulay
- Art - Construction/Deconstruction - The Dears
- Art - Layout - Patrick Francis Guay / Rory Wilson / The Dears
- Photography - Richmond Lam
- Administration - Kat Sambor / Ben Berry
- Management - Jeff Castelaz / Dangerbird Management
- A&R - Jeff Castelaz / Peter Walker
- Legalment - Craig E. Averill, Esq./Serling Rooks Ferrara McKoy & Worob, LLP

== Reception ==
Professional ratings
Aggregate scores
Source	Rating
Metacritic	69/100
Review scores
Source	Rating
AllMusic	4/5 stars
The A.V. Club	B
Drowned in Sound	4/10
Entertainment Weekly	A−
NME	6/10
Paste	6.8/10
Pitchfork	2.4/10
PopMatters	8/10 discs
Rolling Stone	3.5/5 stars
Spin	7/10 stars

- Rolling Stone - "A four-part song cycle involving apocalyptic prophecy and frozen hell, Degeneration Street often reads as art-rock with a death-metal storyline... Lightburn's amoebic tenor is still the main attraction: soul crooner one minute, punk shouter the next, he's a prime candidate for rock's next Broadway musical." (Ratings: Rolling Stone - 4.5/5 stars; Community - 5/5 stars)
- Pitchfork - "Everything Degeneration Street attempts feels a bit too emphatic. When it rocks, it heads for the arenas; when it slinks, it seeks the cover of low, gray clouds. That problem has two-fold consequences. First, it makes many the songs maudlin and melodramatic, occasionally unbearable. What's more, it makes each Dears approach-- heavy rock insurgencies, sweeping synthesizer ambles, big breezy janglers-- seem that much more polar. The album feels scattered and uneven, like a band without direction or restraint." (Rating: 2.4)
- Paste Magazine - "If Degeneration Street, The Dears’ fifth full-length, is any indication, they don't seem to give too much of a shit. It's the most Dears-like thing they've ever produced: an ambitious, insanely layered, eclectic (sometimes too eclectic) concept album about the thick, looming boundaries that separate Heaven from the Hell we call Earth." (Rating 6.8)
- BBC Music - "Degeneration Street has more than its fair share of catchy hooks, and the usual Dears trademarks of stylistic diversity, with plenty of obvious pop references from the 60s to the 90s. It will no doubt go down well at their famously torrid live shows, and will probably be popular with drivers. Just don’t expect much in the way of subtlety, humour or lyrics that stand up to much analysis in a home listen context. Lightburn may have often been compared to Morrissey, but it’s much more for his vocal tone than any strong sense of irony or wit."
- NME.com - "Degeneration Street possesses an adventurous spirit – albeit within The Dears’ now clearly defined parameters. 'Yesteryear’ juts out with ’60s pop charm, the band’s full-blooded power only blitzkrieging through in its chorus, while opener ‘Omega Dog’ and ‘Stick With Me Kid’ marry undercurrents of nocturnal electronics and coy strings to the more recognizable guitar and vocal traits. Ultimately, though, its success still falls on Lightburn's shoulders, a vocalist who's always straddled the line between impassioned and overwrought. His idiosyncratic faux-British growl is as passionate as ever; at times he can be a reflective crooner, at others a messianic preacher." (Rating 6/10)
- Clash Music - "Degeneration Street fits the mould well and is an articulate piece of work. The former influences have become diluted and the band stands as its own protagonists, inventive for sure but flirting with commercialism en route. Few albums this year will match up to the level of proficiency and commitment here and yet it remains a distinct probability that the world still won't listen. An album that will shadow most others." (Rating: 9/10)
- The A.V. Club - "Degeneration Street is a credit to Lightburn's songwriting acumen and stubbornly heightened emotions. The Dears make some bulky records, but no half-hearted ones." (Grade: B)
