= Orchestral Pop Noir Romantique =

EP by The Dears
- Released: 2001
- Genre: Indie rock
- Length: 21:37
- Label: Shipbuilding Records

The Dears chronology
End of a Hollywood Bedtime Story (2000)	Orchestral Pop Noir Romantique (2001)	Nor the Dahlias: The Dears 1995-1998 (2001)

Orchestral Pop Noir Romantique is an EP by The Dears, originally released in 2001 on the now defunct Shipbuilding Records, and later licensed to Universal Music Canada.

== Track listing ==
1. "Heathrow or Deathrow" – 4:22
2. "Autotomy" – 5:21
3. "No Return" – 6:15
4. "Acoustic Guitar Phase" – 5:39

== Year-end charts ==
Chart (2001)	Position
Canada (Nielsen SoundScan)	141
