= End of a Hollywood Bedtime Story =

Studio album by the Dears
- Released: 2000
- Recorded: 1999
- Genre: Indie rock
- Length: 41:40
- Label: Grenadine

The Dears chronology
End of a Hollywood Bedtime Story (2000)	Orchestral Pop Noir Romantique (2001)

End of a Hollywood Bedtime Story is the first album by the Dears. It was released in 2000 on Grenadine Records. "This is a Broadcast", "Heartless Romantic" and the title track were notable singles from the album.

== Critical reception ==
Professional ratings
Review scores
Source	Rating
AllMusic	2.5/5 stars
The Encyclopedia of Popular Music	3/5 stars

The Gazette said: "Raunchy guitars, haunted house organs and lead man Murray Lightburn's timeless Brit-boy vocals combine for dreamy delight." Trouser Press wrote that the album "suffers from overly earnest and often puerile songwriting craftiness; the album is quirky, unpredictable, but also jejune and fragmented."

== Track listing ==
All songs written by Murray Lightburn.

1. "C'était pour la passion" - 4:59
2. "Jazz Waltz No. 3 in B-Flat" - 5:35
3. "This Is a Broadcast" - 3:21
4. "Where the World Begins and Ends" - 6:19
5. "Heartless Romantic" - 4:37
6. "End of a Hollywood Bedtime Story" - 5:08
7. "There Is No Such Thing as Love" - 10:06
8. "Partir, par Terre" - 1:35
