= Begone Dull Care (album) =

Studio album by Junior Boys
- Released: March 24, 2009
- Recorded: 2008
- Genre: Synth-pop
- Length: 47:12
- Label: Domino
- Producer: Junior Boys

Junior Boys chronology
So This Is Goodbye (2006)	Begone Dull Care (2009)	It's All True (2011)

Alternate cover

Singles from Begone Dull Care
- 1. "Hazel" Released: March 10, 2009

Professional ratings
Aggregate scores
Source	Rating
AnyDecentMusic?	7.5/10
Metacritic	76/100
Review scores
Source	Rating
AllMusic	2.5/5 stars
The A.V. Club	B−
Blender	3.5/5 stars
Entertainment Weekly	A−
The Guardian	3/5 stars
NME	8/10
Pitchfork	7.5/10
Q	4/5 stars
Spin	5/10
Uncut	4/5 stars

Begone Dull Care is the third studio album by Canadian electronic music group Junior Boys. The album was released on March 24, 2009 in Canada and on April 7, 2009 in the United States.

The album is named for Begone Dull Care, a short film by National Film Board animator Norman McLaren inspired by the music of Canadian jazz pianist Oscar Peterson, which influenced the album's conception and creation. The front cover gives the band name in French (albeit with the word "première" mistyped), along with Caprice en Couleurs, the French title of the film; the entirety of the liner notes is presented bilingually, including song titles.

== Track listing ==
No.	Title	Writer(s)	Length
1.	"Parallel Lines"	Matt Didemus; Jeremy Greenspan	6:31
2.	"Work"	Didemus; Greenspan	6:32
3.	"Bits & Pieces"	Didemus; Greenspan	4:01
4.	"Dull to Pause"	Greenspan	4:52
5.	"Hazel"	Didemus; Greenspan	6:13
6.	"Sneak a Picture"	Greenspan	7:00
7.	"The Animator"	Greenspan	5:07
8.	"What It's For"	Greenspan	6:56
Total length:			47:12

iTunes Store bonus track
No.	Title	Writer(s)	Length
9.	"Work" (Prins Thomas Remix)	Didemus; Greenspan	10:59
Total length:			58:11

== Charts ==
Chart (2009)	Peak position
US Heatseekers Albums (Billboard)	19
US Independent Albums (Billboard)	42
US Top Dance Albums (Billboard)	6
