= Thrush Hermit =

1990s alt-rock band from Halifax, Canada

- Thrush Hermit, 1997

Background information
- Origin: Halifax, Nova Scotia, Canada
- Genres: Alternative rock
- Years active: 1991–1999, 2005 (one-off), 2010, 2019
- Labels: Murderecords, Elektra, Sonic Unyon
- Past members: Joel Plaskett; Rob Benvie; Ian McGettigan; Michael Catano; Cliff Gibb; Benn Ross

Thrush Hermit was a Canadian alternative rock band active in the 1990s, known for their "highly energetic, humorous, and unpredictable performances," as quoted by Vice News.

== History ==
Thrush Hermit was formed in Halifax, Nova Scotia in 1991 by Joel Plaskett (vocals, guitar), Rob Benvie (vocals, guitar), Ian McGettigan (vocals, bass), and Michael Catano (drums). Catano was replaced by Cliff Gibb in 1994; Gibb in turn left the band in 1999 and was replaced by Benn Ross.

They signed with Murderecords in 1994 in time to release their Smart Bomb EP, which featured Benvie's song "French Inhale" and Plaskett's "Hated It". The former would get some rotation on MuchMusic, which then held a reputation for more alternative programming, while the latter would end up in the Kevin Smith film Mallrats.

Following the release of the band's second EP, the Steve Albini-produced The Great Pacific Ocean, the group signed in 1996 with Elektra Entertainment which released their first full-length album, Sweet Homewrecker, in 1997. The album was recorded in Memphis with producer Doug Easley. It showcased the songwriting of Plaskett, Benvie and McGettigan. The album proved a disappointment from Elektra's standpoint however, and Thrush Hermit was bought out of their contract.

After their foray into the United States market, Thrush Hermit returned north to release their final album, Clayton Park, on Sonic Unyon in 1999. The album was a critical success, and was nominated for a Juno Award. Thrush Hermit performed as part of Humble & Fred Fest at Fort York in Toronto, and at the Horseshoe Tavern in 1999, but made plans to disband in September that year. The band had signed up for the triple-headliner "Front Man War Tour" alongside The Flashing Lights and Local Rabbits, but had to back out because of Plaskett's health. Once he recovered, the band embarked on their own farewell tour of Canada, in December 1999, and then disbanded.

Thrush Hermit were featured on the mainstage at Edgefest in 1995; rather than playing their own material they played exclusively Steve Miller Band covers. Similarly, for their first national television appearance on MuchMusic they played a Nazareth cover instead of highlighting any songs from their album.

Plaskett went on to begin a recording career with his band The Joel Plaskett Emergency. Benvie released a solo record under the moniker "Tigre Benvie", and subsequently joined The Dears, while McGettigan began producing records by Canadian rock acts such as The Flashing Lights. McGettigan also produced records for Plaskett, and later became a member of The Joel Plaskett Emergency. Benvie and McGettigan then joined the band Camouflage Nights, which features a revolving door cast of musicians.

Thrush Hermit reunited for a brief set following a Joel Plaskett Emergency show at the Marquee Club in Halifax on December 31, 2005. The band also reunited for a brief tour of eastern Canada in March 2010. Locations included Moncton, two nights in Halifax at the Paragon (originally the Marquee), Ottawa, Peterborough, Waterloo, two nights and one afternoon show in Toronto. That year New Scotland Records released a box set of all of the Thrush Hermit recordings.

In 2019, the band announced that they were reuniting for 14 shows to commemorate the 20th anniversary of the release of Clayton Park.

== Tribute record ==
In 2008 a tribute album was released, titled Songs For The Gang: Thrush Hermit Tribute featuring Thrush Hermit songs by Canadian artists including The Meligrove Band and Two Hours Traffic. The album was issued by Gooseberry Records on CD and digital download via Zunior.

== Discography ==
=== Albums ===
- 1997: Sweet Homewrecker (Elektra)
- 1999: Clayton Park (Sonic Unyon)

=== EPs ===
- 1993: Ammo (Cinnamon Toast Records)
- 1994: Smart Bomb (Murderecords)
- 1995: The Great Pacific Ocean (Murderecords)
- 1997: Rock and Roll Detective (Elektra)

=== 7" Singles ===
- 1993: "Marya" (Genius Records)
- 1994: "French Inhale" (Genius Records)
- 1995: "Take Another Drag" (Bong Load)
- 1997: "Giddy with the Drugs" (Murderecords)

=== Collections ===
- 2010: The Complete Recordings (New Scotland Records)

== See also ==
- Music of Canada
- Canadian rock
- List of bands from Canada
- Category:Canadian musical groups
