= Clayton Park (album) =

Studio album by Thrush Hermit
- Released: February 23, 1999
- Recorded: May 1998; The Gas Station; Toronto, Ontario
- Genre: Indie rock
- Length: 57:08
- Label: Sonic Unyon

Thrush Hermit chronology
Sweet Homewrecker (1997)	Clayton Park (1999)

Professional ratings
Review scores
Source	Rating
Allmusic	4.5/5 stars

Clayton Park is the second full-length album by Canadian rock band Thrush Hermit. It was released on Sonic Unyon in 1999, and is the last album they released as a band. The album produced two singles and videos for the songs "From the Back of the Film" and "The Day We Hit the Coast".

Clayton Park is a suburb in Halifax, Nova Scotia, the band's hometown.

The album was a shortlisted Juno Award nominee for Alternative Album of the Year at the Juno Awards of 2000. It was later selected as the 85th greatest Canadian album of all time in Bob Mersereau's 2007 book The Top 100 Canadian Albums.

In 2020, the album was shortlisted for the Polaris Heritage Prize at the 2020 Polaris Music Prize ceremony.

== Track listing ==
1. "From the Back of the Film" (Joel Plaskett) – 2:04
2. "(Oh Man!) What to Do?" (Ian McGettigan) – 4:02
3. "Violent Dreams" (Plaskett) – 7:07
4. "The Day We Hit the Coast" (Plaskett) – 6:32
5. "Headin' South" (Robert Benvie) – 5:52
6. "Western Dreamz" (Benvie) – 5:24
7. "Songs for the Gang" (Plaskett) – 3:07
8. "Uneventful" (Plaskett) – 6:11
9. "Oh My Soul!" (Plaskett) – 4:17
10. "We Are Being Reduced" (Plaskett) – 6:17
11. "Before You Leave" (Plaskett) – 6:08

== Album credits ==
=== Personnel ===
- Rob Benvie – Guitar, Vocals
- Ian McGettigan – Bass, Vocals, Artwork
- Joel Plaskett – Guitar, Vocals
- Cliff Gibb – Drums
- Ben Gunning – Guitar on "Before You Leave"

=== Production ===
- Recorded and Mixed by Dale Morningstar at The Gas Station, Toronto, Ontario (May 1998)
- Mastered by Brett Zilahi at Metalworks Studios, Toronto

== Outtakes ==
A cover version of the 1971 Budgie song "Nude Disintegrating Parachutist Woman", recorded during the Clayton Park sessions, appeared on Grenadine Records' Syrup & Gasoline, Volume 1 compilation album.

== Covers ==
"The Day We Hit the Coast" was covered by Emm Gryner on her album Girl Versions.
