= Smart Bomb (EP) =

EP by Thrush Hermit
- Released: 1994
- Genre: Indie rock
- Label: Murderecords

Thrush Hermit chronology
Smart Bomb (1994)	The Great Pacific Ocean (1995)

Smart Bomb is the debut EP by Canadian rock band Thrush Hermit, released in 1994 on Murderecords. It was rated 2.5 stars by AllMusic.

== Track listing ==
1. Hated It
2. French Inhale
3. All Dressed Up
4. Pink Is the Colour
5. Cott
6. You Got an Answer
7. Radio Blaster
