= It's All True (Junior Boys album) =

Studio album by Junior Boys
- Released: June 13, 2011
- Recorded: 2010–11
- Genre: Synth-pop
- Length: 51:25
- Label: Domino

Junior Boys chronology
Begone Dull Care (2009)	It's All True (2011)	Big Black Coat (2016)

Singles from It's All True
- 1. "Banana Ripple" Released: May 11, 2011; 2. "You'll Improve Me" Released: December 12, 2011

Professional ratings
Aggregate scores
Source	Rating
AnyDecentMusic?	7.5/10
Metacritic	78/100
Review scores
Source	Rating
AllMusic	3.5/5 stars
The A.V. Club	B
The Boston Phoenix	3/4 stars
The Guardian	4/5 stars
The Irish Times	4/5 stars
Mojo	4/5 stars
Pitchfork	7.8/10
Q	3/5 stars
Spin	7/10
Uncut	4/5 stars

It's All True is the fourth studio album by Canadian electronic music duo Junior Boys. The album was released on June 13, 2011.

== Release ==
On March 11, 2011, Junior Boys announced they were releasing their fourth studio album.

== Critical reception ==
It's All True was met with "generally favorable" reviews from critics. At Metacritic, which assigns a weighted average rating out of 100 to reviews from mainstream publications, this release received an average score of 78 based on 30 reviews. Aggregate website AnyDecentMusic? gave the release a 7.5 out of 10 based on a critical consensus of 29 reviews.

In a review for AllMusic, critic Andy Kellman wrote: "For all the sonic shimmer, not much exposure is needed to realize that the album concerns an embittering relationship. The duo’s sound is remarkably amorphous, inviting countless comparisons and context placements across several decades and styles."

== Track listing ==
No.	Title	Writer(s)	Length
1.	"Itchy Fingers"	Jeremy Greenspan	4:38
2.	"Playtime"	Greenspan	6:42
3.	"You'll Improve Me"	Matt Didemus; Greenspan	5:53
4.	"A Truly Happy Ending"	Greenspan	4:02
5.	"The Reservoir"	Didemus; Greenspan	4:09
6.	"Second Chance"	Greenspan	5:35
7.	"Kick the Can"	Didemus; Greenspan	5:31
8.	"EP"	Didemus; Greenspan	5:41
9.	"Banana Ripple"	Greenspan	9:14
Total length:			51:25

== Charts ==
Chart (2011)	Peak position
UK Independent Album Breakers (OCC)	17
US Heatseekers Albums (Billboard)	10
US Top Dance Albums (Billboard)	8
