= Thank You Good Night Sold Out =

Live album by the Dears
- Released: October 26, 2004
- Genre: Indie rock
- Length: 68:37
- Label: MapleMusic

The Dears chronology
No Cities Left (2003)	Thank You Good Night Sold Out (2004)	Gang of Losers (2006)

Professional ratings
Review scores
Source	Rating
AllMusic	3.5/5 stars
Tiny Mix Tapes	4/5 stars
Stylus	C+

Thank You Good Night Sold Out is a live album by the Dears, released in 2004 on MapleMusic Recordings.

== Track listing ==
1. "Autotomy" – 11:17
2. "C'Était pour la passion" – 5:28
3. "End of a Hollywood Bedtime Story" – 5:58
4. "Who Are You, Defenders of the Universe?" – 4:17
5. "22: The Death of All the Romance" – 6:24
6. "Warm and Sunny Days" – 7:11
7. "Lost in the Plot" – 5:26
8. "Pinned Together, Falling Apart" – 22:01
