= Who Shot Rock & Roll =

2009 photography exhibition

Who Shot Rock and Roll logo.

Who Shot Rock & Roll: A Photographic History, 1955 to the Present was the first major museum exhibition of Rock music photography. The exhibit was organized by guest curator Gail Buckland at the Brooklyn Museum in 2009. The exhibition toured from 2009 to 2013, visiting the Brooklyn Museum (Brooklyn, New York), Worcester Art Museum (Worcester, Massachusetts), Memphis Brooks Museum of Art (Memphis, Tennessee), Akron Art Museum (Akron, Ohio), Columbia Museum of Art (Columbia, South Carolina), Birmingham Museum of Art (Birmingham, Alabama), Tucson Museum of Art (Tucson, Arizona), Allentown Art Museum (Allentown, Pennsylvania), Annenberg Space for Photography (Los Angeles, California) and Auckland Art Gallery Toi o Tāmaki (Auckland, New Zealand).

== Exhibit ==
The exhibit was a collaboration between Gail Buckland and the Brooklyn Museum, which began after the museum learned that Buckland was writing a book focusing on the photographers behind iconic rock-and-roll photographs. Buckland states in the preface to her book (also named, Who Shot Rock & Roll: A Photographic History, 1955-Present), "The Brooklyn Museum...invited me to work with them to develop and curate the most exciting museum show of rock-and-roll photography ever produced. The book serves as the catalogue to this landmark exhibition."

The exhibition is in six sections: behind the scenes; career beginnings; live performances; crowds and fans; portraits; images and album covers. The exhibit covers over 50 years of rock-and-roll history and encompasses 175 works from more than 100 photographers.

Blondie played the opening party on October 29, 2009. Debbie Harry changed her hair color to brunette for the occasion.

The Los Angeles exhibit featured an original documentary entitled Who Shot Rock & Roll: The Film, which was commissioned by the Annenberg Foundation, directed by Steven Kochones and produced by Arclight Productions. Filmed and projected in 4K resolution, the film presents more than 600 photographs, interviews and behind-the-scenes footage.

== Quotes ==
“I’m not that interested in celebrity,” Buckland said, “Substance and creativity is what interests me. If rock and roll is anything, it’s supposed to be real. That what holds it together, it’s an expression of something deep and honest within us. I chose photos that tell the story with a degree of honesty.”

== Photographers ==
Images from more than 100 photographers are exhibited including:

- Bob Gruen
- Pennie Smith
- Jim Marshall
- Michael Zagaris
- Gered Mankowitz
- Kate Simon
- Jill Furmanovsky
- Linda McCartney
- Ian Dickson
- Diane Arbus
- William PoPsie Randolph
- Albert Watson
- Annie Leibovitz
- Laura Levine
- Andreas Gursky
- Michael Putland
- Baron Wolman
- Henry Diltz
- Barry Feinstein
- Max Vadukul
- Richard Avedon
- Lynn Goldsmith
- Ed Caraeff
- Ryan McGinley
- Maripol
- Dennis Hopper
- Elaine Mayes
- Jerry Schatzberg
- Astrid Kirchherr
- James Mollison
- Valerie Jodoin Keaton
- Robert Whitaker
- Nat Finkelstein
