= Protest (EP) =

EP by The Dears
- Released: 2002
- Genre: Indie rock
- Label: MapleMusic Recordings

The Dears chronology
Nor the Dahlias: The Dears 1995-1998 (2001)	Protest (2002)	No Cities Left (2003)

Protest is an EP by The Dears, with a limited initial release in 2002. It was later re-released in a mass market version with different artwork in 2004. The EP was also included as a bonus disc in the Australian release of No Cities Left.

== Track listing ==
(2002 release)

1. "Heaven, Have Mercy on Us" – 3:56
2. "Summer of Protest" – 7:01
3. "No Hope Before Destruction" – 6:33

(2004 release)

1. "Heaven, Have Mercy on Us" – 3:56
2. "Summer of Protest" – 7:01
3. "No Hope Before Destruction" – 6:33
4. "Protest (Parallel)" – 11:50 (remix and additional production by chaonaut)
