= Heart = weapon =

Studio album by Every Move a Picture
- Released: June 5, 2006
- Recorded: 2005, Stratosphere Sound in New York City, New York
- Length: 33:01
- Label: V2 Records
- Producer: Eli Janney; Allen Davis

Professional ratings
Review scores
Source	Rating
Virgin	4/5 stars

Heart = weapon is the debut studio album by Every Move a Picture. Recorded during December 2005 and released on June 5, 2006 on V2 Records, it had mixed to positive reviews by critics. Its lead, and only, single "Signs of Life" was released prior to the album, and was featured in the soundtracks to Juiced and Need for Speed: Carbon. Eli Janney and Allen Davis are producers of the album.

== Track listing ==
1. "Mission Bell" (2:47)
2. "Signs of Life" (3:48)
3. "The Best Is on the Outside" (3:30)
4. "Chemical Burns" (3:52)
5. "Outlaw" (3:22)
6. "Dust" (3:11)
7. "Simple Lessons in Love and Secession" (3:27)
8. "On the Edge of Something Beautiful (At 12AM)" (2:57)
9. "Dixie" (2:34)
10. "St John's Night" (3:39)
