= Who Shot Rock & Roll: The Film =

2013 film

- Film poster
- Directed by: Steven Kochones
- Produced by: Steven Kochones; Joe Russo
- Starring: Alice Cooper; Noel Gallagher; Debbie Harry; Henry Rollins; Mary McCartney
- Cinematography: John Tipton
- Edited by: James Pendorf
- Production company: Arclight Productions
- Release date: June 23, 2012 (Los Angeles premiere)
- Running time: 37 minutes
- Country: United States

Who Shot Rock & Roll: The Film is a documentary film directed by Steven Kochones, which depicts the impact of photography on rock and roll history and culture over six decades. The film had its premiere in Los Angeles on June 23, 2012 in conjunction with the Annenberg Space for Photography's "Who Shot Rock & Roll" exhibit, and later shown at the 2013 Tribeca Film Festival.

== Synopsis ==
Hear the stories behind rock's most enduring images. This documentary features interviews, photographs and never-before-seen footage spotlighting the work of rock photographers whose images defined rock and roll history, including photographers Edward Colver, Henry Diltz, Jill Furmanovsky, Lynn Goldsmith, Bob Gruen, Norman Seeff, Mark Seliger, Guy Webster, and Linda McCartney. Also included are iconic songs by Blondie, The Doors, Kiss, Led Zeppelin, Oasis, The Rolling Stones, The Sex Pistols, The Who and others.

== Cast ==
- Alice Cooper
- Noel Gallagher
- Debbie Harry
- Henry Rollins
- Mary McCartney
- Edward Colver
- Henry Diltz
- Jill Furmanovsky
- Lynn Goldsmith
- Bob Gruen
- Norman Seeff
- Mark Seliger
- Guy Webster
- Michael Ochs
- Gail Buckland
- Gary Burden

== Production ==
In 2012, director Steven Kochones was commissioned by the Annenberg Foundation to enhance the exhibit Who Shot Rock & Roll by making an original documentary featuring legendary music photographers and their subjects. The exhibit had originated at the Brooklyn Museum in 2009. The documentary, produced by Arclight Productions, was filmed in 5K resolution on RED Epic cameras and presented in 4K resolution at 60 frames per second. Archival content was also used, including rare footage of Ike and Tina Turner, which involved making a new transfer from 16mm footage that was shot nearly 40 years earlier.

== Release ==
Who Shot Rock & Roll: The Film screened at the 2013 Tribeca Film Festival and was nominated in the category Best Documentary Short. The film won awards at the Ojai Film Festival (2013), Philadelphia FirstGlance Film Festival (2013), Rhode Island International Film Festival (2013), and Savannah Film Festival (2013).
