= Last Exit (Junior Boys album) =

Studio album by Junior Boys
- Released: June 7, 2004
- Genres: Synth-pop; electropop; tech house
- Length: 53:26
- Labels: Domino; KIN
- Producer: Junior Boys

Junior Boys chronology
Last Exit (2004)	So This Is Goodbye (2006)

Singles from Last Exit
- 1. "Birthday" Released: November 20, 2003; 2. "High Come Down" Released: February 2004

Last Exit is the debut studio album by Canadian electronic music group Junior Boys. It was released on June 7, 2004, by KIN Records in the United Kingdom and on September 21, 2004, by Domino Recording Company in the United States. The album was promoted by two singles: "Birthday" and "High Come Down".

Last Exit received rave reviews from critics. The United States release contains a bonus disc adding songs previously only available on their EPs.

== Critical reception ==
Professional ratings
Aggregate scores
Source	Rating
Metacritic	89/100
Review scores
Source	Rating
AllMusic	4.5/5 stars
Blender	4/5 stars
Entertainment Weekly	B+
The Guardian	4/5 stars
NME	9/10
Pitchfork	8.9/10
Q	4/5 stars
Rolling Stone	3/5 stars
Spin	A−
Uncut	5/5 stars

Last Exit received highly positive reviews from music critics. The album holds a score of 89 out of 100 on the review aggregator website Metacritic, indicating "universal acclaim". Writing for Pitchfork, Scott Plagenhoef praised the album for its "deceptively simple and very approachable tracks" and remarked that songwriter Jeremy Greenspan was able "to fold elements of nearly a quarter-century of forward-looking pop into a distinct sound without sounding either conceptual or trading on contradictions or the smoke-and-mirrors of attention-grabbing eclecticism." Uncut wrote that "the contrast between romanticism and sonic daring, alien time signatures and freakishly pretty tunes, is irresistible." The Guardian's Dorian Lynskey stated that Junior Boys' "spectral vision of electronic pop is an understated, unpredictable delight", while PopMatters' Adrien Begrand called Last Exit "a warm, friendly, entirely accessible pop album." Andy Kellman of AllMusic noted that the album's songs "can be enjoyed with or without all of the analysis and context" and praised the duo's "ability to be alluringly aloof". Leah Greenblatt of Entertainment Weekly called the album "prettily nostalgic (think New Order, Erasure, Bronski Beat) and gloriously right now."

=== Accolades ===
The song "Teach Me How to Fight" ranked at number 57 on Porcys' list of the best singles of 2000–2004, as well as number 16 on Screenagers' list of the best songs of the 2000s.

Publication	Country	Rank	List
Cokemachineglow	Canada	19	Albums of the Year
Eye Weekly	Canada	9	Albums of the Year
Magic	France	10	Albums of the Year
Porcys	Poland	4	Albums of the Year
Porcys	Poland	22	Top 100 Albums from 2000 to 2004
Porcys	Poland	7	Top 100 Albums of the 2000s
Screenagers	Poland	25	Albums of the Year
Screenagers	Poland	4	Top 100 Albums of the 2000s
B92	Serbia	16	Albums of the Year
CD Drome	Spain	24	Albums of the Year
Mondosonoro	Spain	17	Albums of the Year
Rockdelux	Spain	21	Albums of the Year
Nöjesguiden	Sweden	36	Albums of the Year
Sonic	Sweden	16	Albums of the Year
The Guardian	UK	*	1000 Albums to Hear Before You Die
No Ripcord	UK	10	Albums of the Year
Rough Trade	UK	57	Albums of the Year
Uncut	UK	15	Albums of the Year
AllMusic	USA	*	Albums of the Year
Left Off the Dial	USA	14	Albums of the Year
Pitchfork	USA	28	Albums of the Year
Pitchfork	USA	76	Top 200 Albums of the 2000s
PopMatters	USA	26	Albums of the Year
Prefix	USA	49	Albums of the Year
Stylus	USA	4	Albums of the Year
Stylus	USA	26	The 50 Best Albums of 2000–2004
Stylus	USA	47	Top 100 Albums of the 2000s
Treble	USA	133	Top 150 Albums of the 2000s
The Village Voice	USA	41	Albums of the Year

*denotes an unordered list

== Track listing ==
No.	Title	Writer(s)	Length
1.	"More Than Real"	Johnny Dark; Jeremy Greenspan	6:39
2.	"Bellona"	Dark; Greenspan	5:38
3.	"High Come Down"	Dark; Greenspan	4:29
4.	"Last Exit"	Dark; Greenspan	6:35
5.	"Neon Rider"	Greenspan	2:08
6.	"Birthday"	Dark; Greenspan	4:16
7.	"Under the Sun"	Matt Didemus; Greenspan	7:02
8.	"Three Words"	Greenspan	5:46
9.	"Teach Me How to Fight"	Didemus; Greenspan	5:31
10.	"When I'm Not Around"	Greenspan	5:22
Total length:			53:26

US bonus disc
No.	Title	Writer(s)	Length
1.	"Unbirthday"	Dark; Greenspan	6:04
2.	"Last Exit" (Fennesz Mix)	Dark; Greenspan	5:35
3.	"Birthday" (Manitoba Mix)	Dark; Greenspan	5:12
4.	"A Certain Association"	Didemus; Greenspan	2:22
Total length:			19:13
