= Jessy Lanza =

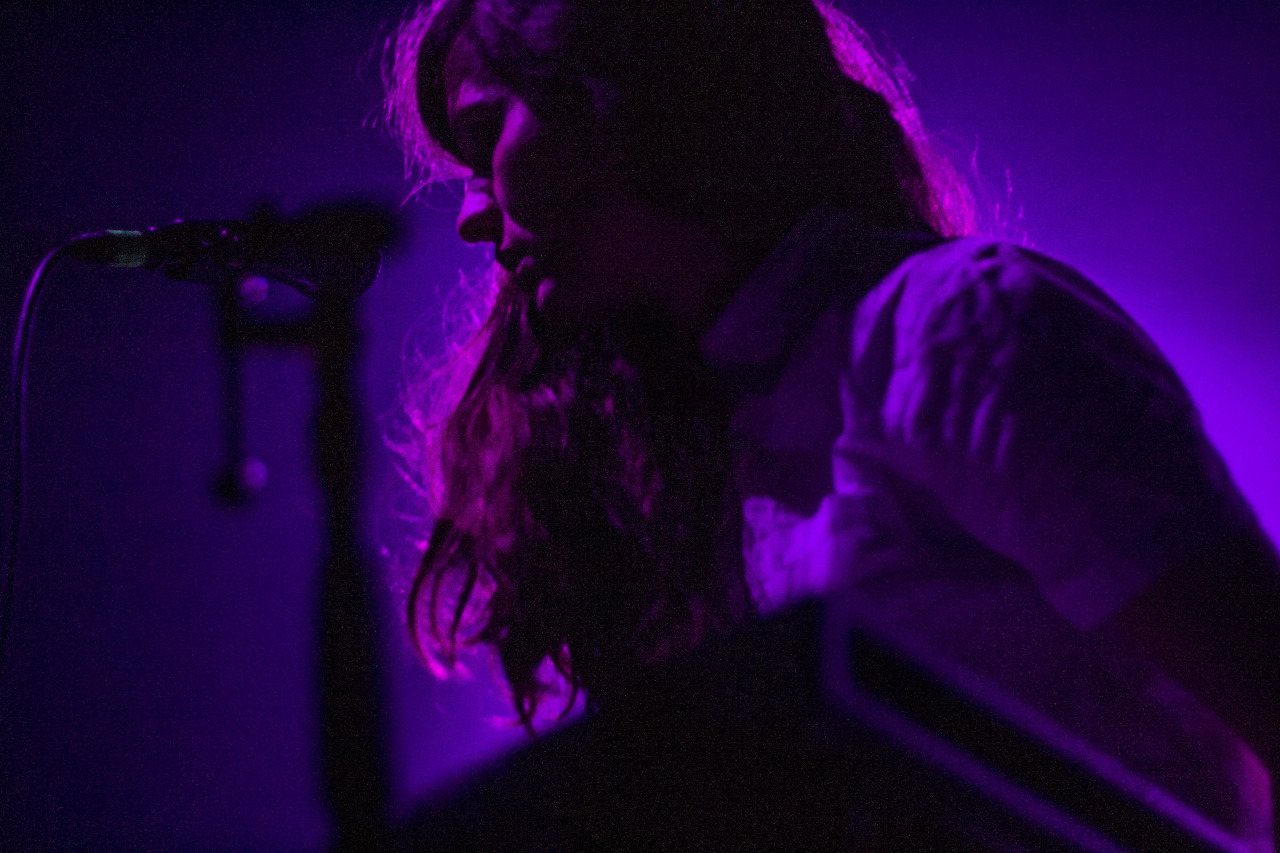
- Lanza performing in Philadelphia

Background information
- Born: September 3, 1985 (age 40)
- Origin: Hamilton, Ontario, Canada
- Genres: Techno-pop, R&B, electronic
- Occupations: Dj, music producer, songwriter, vocalist
- Instruments: Vocals, drum machine, keyboards, synthesizer
- Years active: 2009–present
- Label: Hyperdub
- Website: jessylanza.com

Jessy Lanza (born September 3, 1985) is a Canadian electronic songwriter, producer, and vocalist from Hamilton, Ontario, Canada. She has released four albums, Pull My Hair Back (2013), Oh No (2016), All the Time (2020) and Love Hallucination (2023) to critical praise on UK label Hyperdub.

== Life and career ==
Lanza grew up playing piano and clarinet before going to Concordia University to study classical and jazz piano. Her parents were both musicians, and her father ran a speaker rental business, which introduced her to synthesizers and drum machines at a young age. Before starting her career as a singer and music producer, she worked as a music teacher.

Lanza was listed as one of the best new artists of 2013 by XLR8R. In a review of her debut album, Pull My Hair Back, she was described by The Guardian as "the latest and possibly greatest of the new ethereal soul girls" and ranked No. 4 on Resident Advisor's Top 20 Albums of 2013. Pull My Hair Back was co-written and co-produced with Jeremy Greenspan of Junior Boys and released on the UK's Hyperdub record label. The album Pull My Hair Back was a shortlisted nominee for the 2014 Polaris Music Prize.

Lanza met Dan Snaith, who records under the name Caribou, in Hamilton. In 2014, she collaborated with Caribou on his 2014 album Our Love.

In 2015, she collaborated with Morgan Geist, recording vocals for The Galleria EP Calling Card / Mezzanine, and in 2019 she contributed vocals for a single titled Stop & Go.

Her second album Oh No was released in 2016, and was shortlisted again for the 2016 Polaris Music Prize.

Her third album All the Time was released in July 2020.

In 2023 she released the album Love Hallucination.

== Influences ==
Lanza possesses a soprano vocal range, similar to Elizabeth Fraser and Aaliyah. As a child, Lanza listened to Janet Jackson and Paula Abdul. The singer said that having a background in studying jazz helped her to have "the ability to hear and lift chord progressions", which led her to an understanding of R&B music that permeates her recent work. Laced with funk, soul, R&B, and haunting high-register vocals, Lanza cites Missy Elliott and Timbaland as early influences on her songwriting. The singer has also cited such artists as Evelyn "Champagne" King and Melba Moore. She also cited Japanese synthpop artists of the 1970s and 1980s, such as Yellow Magic Orchestra members Haruomi Hosono, Ryuichi Sakamoto, and Yukihiro Takahashi, as key influences. She has a postmodern approach to writing music, comparing her songs to a mashup of all the pop songs over the last 40 years that she likes.

== Discography ==
=== Studio albums ===
- Pull My Hair Back (2013)
- Oh No (2016)
- All the Time (2020)
- DJ-Kicks: Jessy Lanza (2021)
- Love Hallucination (2023)

=== EPs ===
- You Never Show Your Love (2015)
- Slapped By My Life (2025)

=== Singles ===
- "Beach Mode" (2013) Ikonika feature
- "Kathy Lee" (2013)
- "Keep Moving" (2013)
- "5785021" (2014)
- "You and Me" (2014)
- "You Never Show Your Love" (2015) (ft. DJ Spinn & Taso)
- "It Means I Love You" (2016)
- "VV Violence" (2016)
- "Oh No" (2016)
- "Lick in Heaven" (2020)
- "Face" (2020)
- "Anyone Around" (2020)
- "Don't Leave Me Now" (2023)
- "Midnight Ontario" (2023)

==== As featured artist ====
Title	Year	Album
"Mirror" (Bambii featuring Jessy Lanza and Yaeji)	2025	Infinity Club II
"Together" (the Avalanches featuring Nikki Nair, Jessy Lanza and Prentiss)	2026	TBA
