= Rob Benvie =

Canadian musician

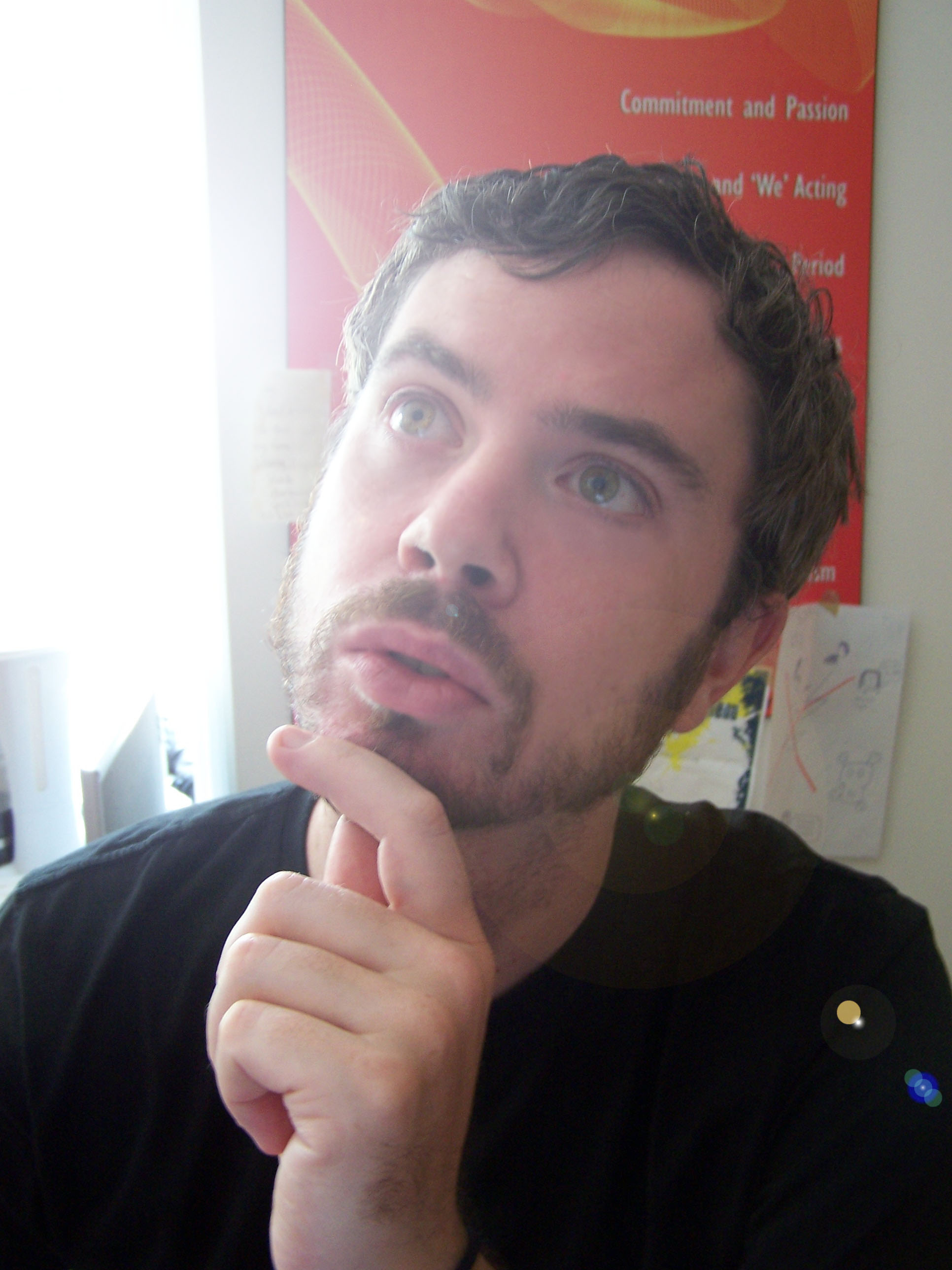

Background information
- Origin: Halifax, Nova Scotia, Canada
- Genres: Indie rock alternative rock
- Instruments: Guitar, vocals
- Years active: 1990s–present
- Label: Murderecords; Sonic Unyon Records; Elektra Records
- Website: www.robbenvie.com

Rob Benvie (born in Halifax, Nova Scotia) is a Canadian musician and writer who has performed with alternative rock acts Thrush Hermit, Bankruptcy, Camouflage Nights, and The Dears. He also records and occasionally performs live as Tigre Benvie.

== Musical career ==
Benvie first gained notoriety as the guitarist, singer and songwriter in Halifax rock band Thrush Hermit. Thrush Hermit also included Joel Plaskett, Ian McGettigan and Cliff Gibb. Touring extensively throughout North America, Thrush Hermit released two EPs on Murderecords: Smart Bomb and The Great Pacific Ocean. Their first full-length Sweet Homewrecker was released on the American label Elektra Records. In 1999, Thrush Hermit released Clayton Park on Sonic Unyon Records. In 2010, Thrush Hermit briefly reunited for a successful reunion tour, followed by another in 2019 with the reissue of Clayton Park.

Prior to the Thrush Hermit era, Benvie distributed numerous home recordings under such names as The Tennis Injury, Yammer, Drug Dog, and Day Pass. Since Thrush Hermit's 1999 break-up, Benvie has produced several solo albums under his own name and as Tigre Benvie.

In 2001, he joined The Dears as guitar player, and in years following continued to perform and record with the band in various faculties, most actively for 2008's Missiles and 2011's Degeneration Street.

Benvie and McGettigan have recorded and performed as Camouflage Nights. After a string of tour dates and limited edition audio and video releases, the band's long-delayed debut LP was released in April 2012 by Sonic Unyon Records. Camouflage Nights has remixed artists such as Stars, Every Move a Picture, Pony Da Look, along with scoring numerous film and television projects.

In 2015, Benvie founded the rock band Bankruptcy. Their debut LP For The Future was released in April 2016. Bankruptcy's follow-up album, Computers Make the Drinks, was released in 2019.

== Writing ==
In May 2001, literature and humour website McSweeney's Internet Tendency featured an essay by Benvie titled "The Porn I Like". Benvie's first novel, Safety of War, was published by Coach House Books. In 2011, Benvie published a second novel, titled Maintenance, along with a full-length instrumental 'audio companion' available via download through Coach House. His third novel, Bleeding Light, was published in 2021. His fourth novel, The Damagers, was published in 2025 by Knopf.

Benvie also co-wrote the screenplay, with frequent collaborator Maxwell McCabe-Lokos, for McCabe-Lokos' 2021 film Stanleyville.

== Discography ==
- 2000 - Year of the Mutt
- 2002 - Bankruptcy
- 2010 - 2003 (EP)
- 2011 - Maintenance: The Original Soundtrack
- 2012 - Mistiness
- 2013 - Stuplimity, or The Nova Scotia Book of The Dead
- 2015 - How To Write a Romance Novel
- 2016 - For The Future (w/Bankruptcy)
- 2017 - You Will Not Enter The Valley
- 2019 - Computers Make the Drinks (w/Bankruptcy)
- 2020 - Want To Be Freed

== Bibliography ==
- 2004 - Safety of War (Coach House Books)
- 2011 - Maintenance (Coach House Books)
- 2021 - Bleeding Light (Invisible Publishing)
- 2025 - The Damagers (Knopf Canada)
