= Lovers Rock (The Dears album) =

Studio album by the Dears
- Released: May 15, 2020
- Length: 42:45
- Label: Dangerbird

The Dears chronology
Times Infinity Volume Two (2017)	Lovers Rock (2020)	Life Is Beautiful! Life Is Beautiful! Life Is Beautiful! (2025)

Professional ratings
Aggregate scores
Source	Rating
Metacritic	63/100
Review scores
Source	Rating
AllMusic	3.5/5 stars
Beats Per Minute	41%
Exclaim!	8/10
MusicOMH	4/5 stars

Lovers Rock is the eighth studio album by Canadian indie rock band the Dears. It was released on May 15, 2020 under Dangerbird Records.

The first single from the album, "The Worst in Us", was released on March 13, 2020. The second single "I Know What You're Thinking And It's Awful" was released on May 1, 2020.

== Critical reception ==
Lovers Rock was met with generally favorable reviews from critics. At Metacritic, which assigns a weighted average rating out of 100 to reviews from mainstream publications, this release received an average score of 63, based on 7 reviews.

== Track listing ==
Lovers Rock track listing
No.	Title	Length
1.	"Heart of an Animal"	4:52
2.	"I Know What You're Thinking and It's Awful"	3:50
3.	"Instant Nightmare!"	3:38
4.	"Is This What You Really Want?"	3:30
5.	"The Worst In Us"	4:44
6.	"Stille Lost"	5:06
7.	"No Place On Earth"	3:38
8.	"Play Dead"	3:44
9.	"Too Many Wrongs"	4:00
10.	"We'll Go Into Hiding"	5:43
