= So This Is Goodbye =

Studio album by Junior Boys
- Released: August 22, 2006
- Genre: Synth-pop
- Length: 48:58
- Label: Domino
- Producer: Junior Boys

Junior Boys chronology
Last Exit (2004)	So This Is Goodbye (2006)	The Dead Horse EP (2007)

Singles from So This Is Goodbye
- 1. "In the Morning" Released: July 11, 2006

So This is Goodbye is the second studio album by Canadian electronic music group Junior Boys. It was first released by Domino Recording Company on August 22, 2006 in Canada, and on September 11, 2006 in other territories. Junior Boys, now solely comprising the duo of Jeremy Greenspan and Matthew Didemus following the departure of founding member Johnny Dark, recorded the album in Hamilton, Ontario and wrote much of the album's material, with the exception of a cover of the Frank Sinatra song "When No One Cares".

So This Is Goodbye was shortlisted for the 2007 Polaris Music Prize. On June 5, 2007, Junior Boys released So This Is Goodbye as a special edition featuring the original album along with a bonus CD.

== Reception ==
Professional ratings
Aggregate scores
Source	Rating
Metacritic	79/100
Review scores
Source	Rating
AllMusic	4/5 stars
The A.V. Club	A−
The Boston Phoenix	3.5/4 stars
The Guardian	3/5 stars
Los Angeles Times	3/4 stars
NME	7/10
Pitchfork	9.0/10
Q	4/5 stars
Rolling Stone	3/5 stars
URB	4/5 stars

So This Is Goodbye was released to positive reviews from music critics, holding a score of 79 out of 100 on the review aggregator website Metacritic, indicating "generally favorable reviews". Noel Murray of The A.V. Club wrote that Junior Boys "hold to a style that's danceable but purposefully dry", adding that their "emphasis on the aloof and mechanical doesn't diminish their feeling for how humans relate to technology". Mark Pytlik of Pitchfork hailed it as "among the best records you'll hear all year", writing that in spite of Junior Boys' departure from the "rhythmic capriciousness" of their debut Last Exit in favor of more "comparatively streamlined song structures", the album "draws out so many of the same sensations and colors that it feels like a natural next step".

Andy Kellman of AllMusic noted the prominence of "slowly unfurling material that projects a cool sense of comfort", as well as a "semi-subliminal undercurrent of self-deprecation that carries through most of the album" in its lyrics. In the Los Angeles Times, Ann Powers wrote that Greenspan explores themes of desire with an "uncommon delicacy", while observing a "distance to Greenspan's perfectly constructed grooves and well-modulated lyrics that falls somewhere between ironic and mournful." Peter Chambers of Resident Advisor observed the influence of 1980s acts like Tears for Fears, Depeche Mode, Icehouse, the Cars and OMD, adding, "If OMD evoked, this album bares... It's the strength of the songwriting and the beautiful, desolate space this creates for the synthesizers to sing that makes this album truly outstanding."

In a mixed review, The Guardian's Dom Passantino called So This Is Goodbye "pretty, if sterile", while nonetheless concluding that "despite their lack of heart, there's no reason Junior Boys shouldn't be able to survive." Michaelangelo Matos of Spin was far more critical, writing that the album suffered from the absence of former member Johnny Dark's "rhythmic contributions" and, with the exception of "In the Morning", "turns the pathos of [Last Exit] into nearly intolerable bathos".

=== Accolades ===
Resident Advisor named So This Is Goodbye as the third best album of 2006, while Pitchfork ranked it the eleventh best album of the year. Resident Advisor later named it the 45th best album of the decade.

== Track listing ==
All tracks are written by Junior Boys (Matt Didemus and Jeremy Greenspan), except where noted.

No.	Title	Writer(s)	Length
1.	"Double Shadow"		4:22
2.	"The Equalizer"		4:57
3.	"First Time"		5:26
4.	"Count Souvenirs"		4:45
5.	"In the Morning"	Junior Boys; Andi Toma	4:42
6.	"So This Is Goodbye"		5:19
7.	"Like a Child"		6:06
8.	"Caught in a Wave"		3:39
9.	"When No One Cares"	Sammy Cahn; Jimmy Van Heusen	3:49
10.	"FM"		5:53
Total length:			48:58

Special edition bonus disc
No.	Title	Writer(s)	Length
1.	"Like a Child" (Carl Craig Remix)		10:41
2.	"In the Morning" (Hot Chip Remix)	Junior Boys; Toma	9:46
3.	"FM" (Tensnake Remix)		7:19
4.	"The Equalizer" (Morgan Geist Remix)		5:58
5.	"In the Morning" (Alex Smoke Remix)	Junior Boys; Toma	7:16
6.	"Double Shadow" (Kode9 Remix)		6:30
7.	"FM" (Marsen Jules Remix)		5:13
8.	"The Equalizer" (iTunes Session)		4:59
9.	"Under the Sun" (iTunes Session)		7:05
10.	"FM" (iTunes Session)		5:40
11.	"When No One Cares" (iTunes Session)	Cahn; Van Heusen	4:19
Total length:			74:46

== Charts ==
Chart (2006)	Peak position
Swedish Albums (Sverigetopplistan)	38
US Heatseekers Albums (Billboard)	49
US Independent Albums (Billboard)	40
US Top Dance Albums (Billboard)	10
