= Valerie Jodoin Keaton =

Canadian photographer and musician

- Born: Montreal, Quebec, Canada
- Genres: Portraiture, documentary, indie rock
- Occupation(s): Photographer, musician
- Instrument(s): Keyboard flute Vocals
- Years active: 2001–present
- Labels: C-4
- Website: www.valeriejodoinkeaton.com

Valerie Jodoin Keaton is a Canadian photographer and musician.

== Photography career ==
In 2001, Valerie Jodoin Keaton earned a degree in commercial photography at Dawson's Institute of Photography.

In 2009, Jodoin Keaton published a book, Backstage, which depicts rock musicians moments before and after their performances. Her collection contains photos of numerous rock stars, among whom are The Flaming Lips, Beastie Boys, The Smashing Pumpkins, Beck, Rufus Wainwright, Paul McCartney and Jack White.

Jodoin Keaton was selected for Who Shot Rock & Roll: A Photographic History From 1955 to the Present, the first major museum exhibition of rock music photography.

Jodoin Keaton's unique style of documentary portraiture (using a Hasselblad camera) led Paul McCartney to invite her to photograph him on stage during his Quebec City show in 2008. She worked again for Paul McCartney in 2009 during his show in Halifax.

Valerie Jodoin Keaton is represented in Canada by 2m2 Agency and in the United States by Morrison Hotel Gallery.

== Music career ==
Valerie Jodoin Keaton was keyboardist, vocalist and flutist for indie rock band The Dears from 2002 to 2007. During those years, she also collaborated with Montreal indie rock band Malajube. She later co-founded For Those About To Love with ex-Dears members George Donoso and Martin Pelland. François Plante and Jocelyn Tellier joined the project and the album For Those About To Love was released by C-4 Records in 2009. In 2012, she collaborated with Plaster.

== Bibliography ==
Backstage (Varia, 2009)
