= The Dears =

Canadian indie rock band

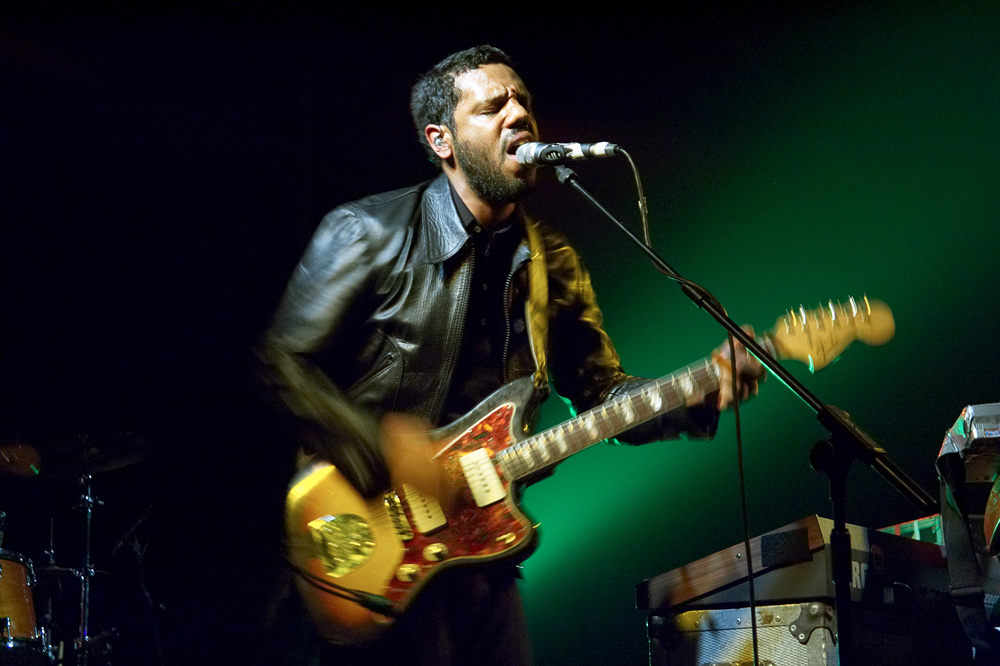
- The Dears at The Electric Ballrooms, Camden, London, UK. February 2005.

Background information
- Origin: Montreal, Quebec, Canada
- Genres: Indie rock, psychedelic rock
- Years active: 1995–present
- Labels: Pheromone, Grenadine, MapleMusic, Bella Union, Arts & Crafts, Dangerbird, Albert, Arts & Crafts México
- Members: Murray Lightburn; Natalia Yanchak; Jeff Luciani
- Past members: Martin Pelland; George Donoso III; Valerie Jodoin Keaton; Adrian Popovich; Jason Kent; Christopher McCarron; Laura Wills; Yann Geoffroy; Rob Benvie; Jonathan Cohen; Joseph Donovan; Richard MacDonald; Brigitte Mayes; John Tod; Andrew White; Patrick Krief; Roberto Arquilla
- Website: www.thedears.org

The Dears are a Canadian indie rock band from Montreal, Quebec. The band is led by the husband-and-wife duo of singer-guitarist Murray Lightburn and keyboardist Natalia Yanchak.

== History ==
The band formed in 1995 and released their first album, End of a Hollywood Bedtime Story, in 2000. Their orchestral, dark pop sound and dramatic live shows established The Dears as part of the then-emerging Canadian indie renaissance.

The Dears performed in Toronto in October 2001 with Sloan. In 2001 and 2002, they released the EPs Orchestral Pop Noir Romantique and Protest, respectively, as well as a collection of unreleased songs, Nor the Dahlias. In 2003, they released their second full-length album No Cities Left, and a string of shows at SXSW '04 launched their international career.

The Dears toured extensively across Canada, U.S., UK, Europe, Japan and Australia supporting the international release of No Cities Left and returned to the studio to record in 2005. Gang of Losers was released in 2006, and was well received by the press.

The Dears have had high-profile gigs as opening act for Sloan, The Tragically Hip, Keane, The Secret Machines, and Morrissey.

On July 10, 2007, The Dears' album Gang of Losers was named to the shortlist for the 2007 Polaris Music Prize. The follow-up Missiles was released in the United Kingdom on October 20 and in North America on October 21, 2008.

On February 15, 2011, The Dears released their fifth studio album, Degeneration Street. The album was named as a longlisted nominee for the 2011 Polaris Music Prize.

== Band members ==
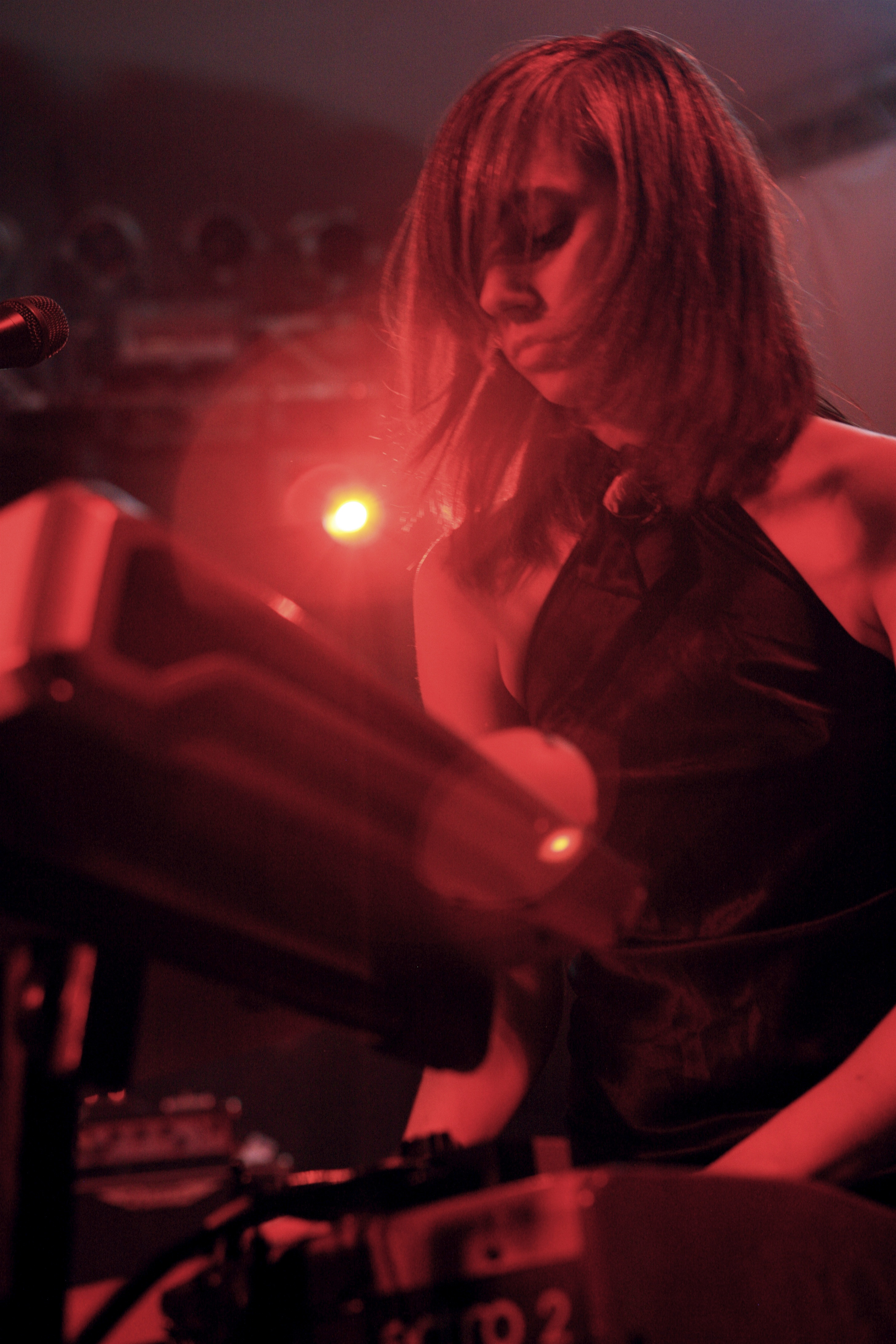
Natalia Yanchak performing at South by Southwest.

=== Current members ===
- Murray Lightburn – vocals, guitar, keyboards, percussion, bass (1995–present)
- Natalia Yanchak – keyboards, vocals (1998–present)
- Jeff Luciani – drums (2010–present)
- Steve Raegele – guitar (2015–present)
- Rémi-Jean LeBlanc – bass (2019–present)

=== Past members ===
- Clinton Ryder – touring bass player (2018)
- Tessa Kautzman – touring bass player (2016–2017)
- Rob Benvie – guitar, bass, keyboards, percussion, vocals (2002–2003, 2009, 2016–2017)
- Patrick Krief – guitar, vocals, piano (2003–2008, 2010–2015)
- Roberto Arquilla – bass (1997–2000, 2010–2015)
- Laura Wills – touring keyboards, vocals (2008–2009)
- Jason Kent – touring guitar, vocals, keyboards (2008–2009, 2017)
- Christopher McCarron – touring guitar player (2008–2009)
- Yann Geoffroy – touring drummer, keyboards (2008–2009)
- Lisa Smith – touring bass player (2008–2009)
- George Donoso III – drums, vocals (2001–2008)
- Martin Pelland – bass, vocals (2001–2007)
- Valérie Jodoin Keaton – keyboards, flute, vocals, percussion (2002–2007)
- Jonathan Cohen – guitar (1999–2002)
- Brigitte Mayes – cello, flute (1999–2002)
- Richard MacDonald – guitar (1995–1998)
- John Tod – drums (1995–2000)
- Andrew White – bass (1995–1998)

== Discography ==
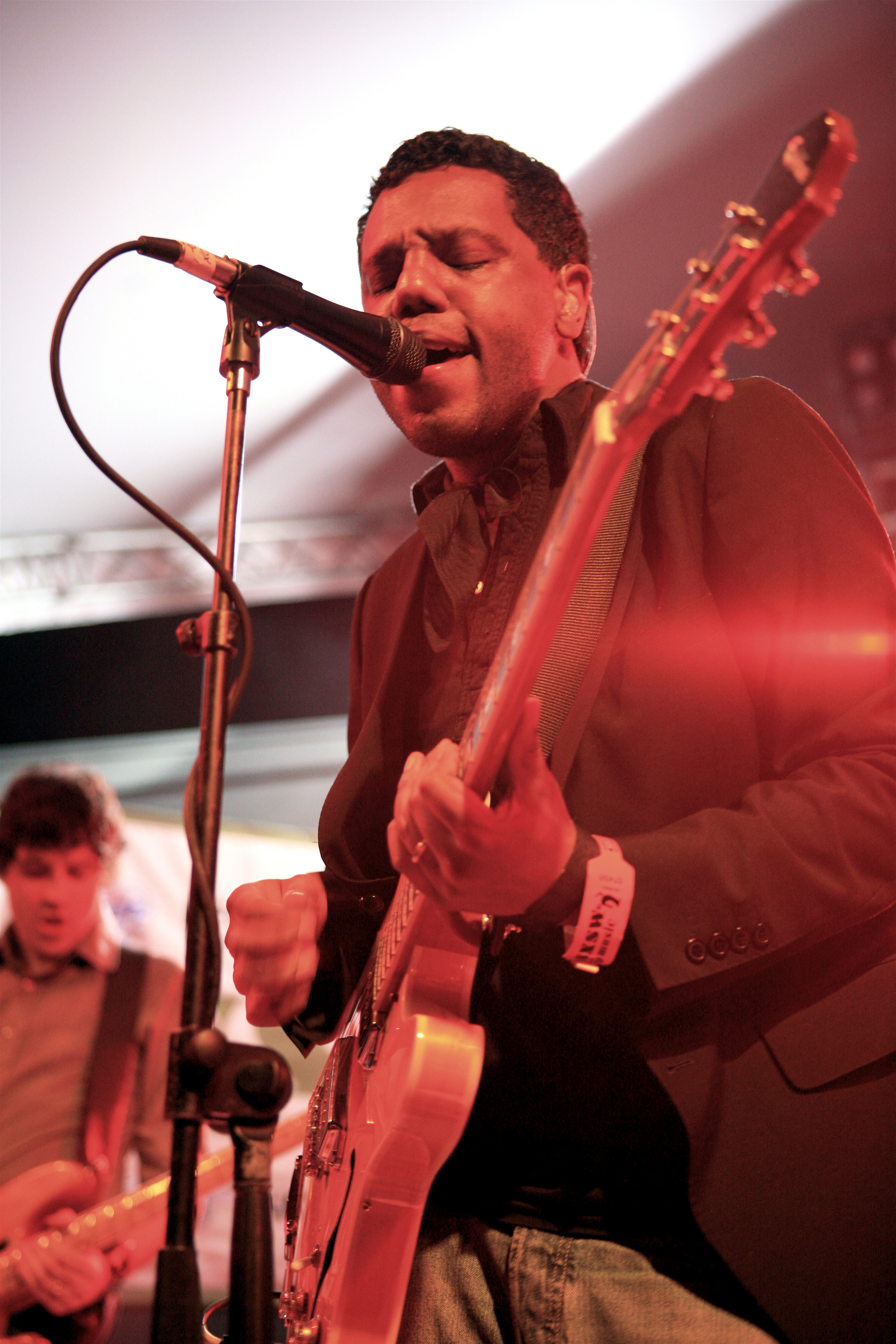
Murray Lightburn performing at South by Southwest.

=== Studio albums ===
- 2000: End of a Hollywood Bedtime Story
- 2003: No Cities Left (No. 127 UK)
- 2006: Gang of Losers (No. 52 CAN, No. 77 UK)
- 2008: Missiles
- 2011: Degeneration Street (No. 37 CAN)
- 2015: Times Infinity Volume One
- 2017: Times Infinity Volume Two
- 2020: Lovers Rock
- 2025: Life Is Beautiful! Life Is Beautiful! Life Is Beautiful!

=== EPs ===
- 2001: Orchestral Pop Noir Romantique
- 2002: Protest
- 2009: iTunes Live from Montreal

=== Compilation albums ===
- 2001: Nor the Dahlias: The Dears 1995-1998

=== Live albums ===
- 2004: Thank You Good Night Sold Out
- 2012: The Dears Live at Pasagüero - Mexico City, Mexico, 2010 (digital only, released by Arts & Crafts Mexico)

=== Singles ===
- 2004: "We Can Have It"
- 2004: "Lost in the Plot"
- 2005: "22: The Death of All the Romance"
- 2006: "Ticket to Immortality"
- 2006: "Whites Only Party"
- 2007: "You and I Are a Gang of Losers"
- 2008: "Money Babies"
- 2010: "Omega Dog"
- 2011: "Thrones"
- 2015: "I Used to Pray for the Heavens to Fall"
- 2015: "Here's to the Death of All the Romance"
- 2017: "To Hold and Have"
- 2017: "Of Fisticuffs"
- 2017: "1998"
- 2017: "I'm Sorry That I Wished You Dead"
- 2020: "The Worst in Us"
- 2020: "Heart of an Animal"

=== Other contributions ===
- Syrup & Gasoline Vol. 2 (2001, Grenadine Records) – "Le pauvre chanteur (From the South Shore)"
- Acoustic 07 (2007, V2 Records) – "You and I Are a Gang of Losers"

== Awards and nominations ==
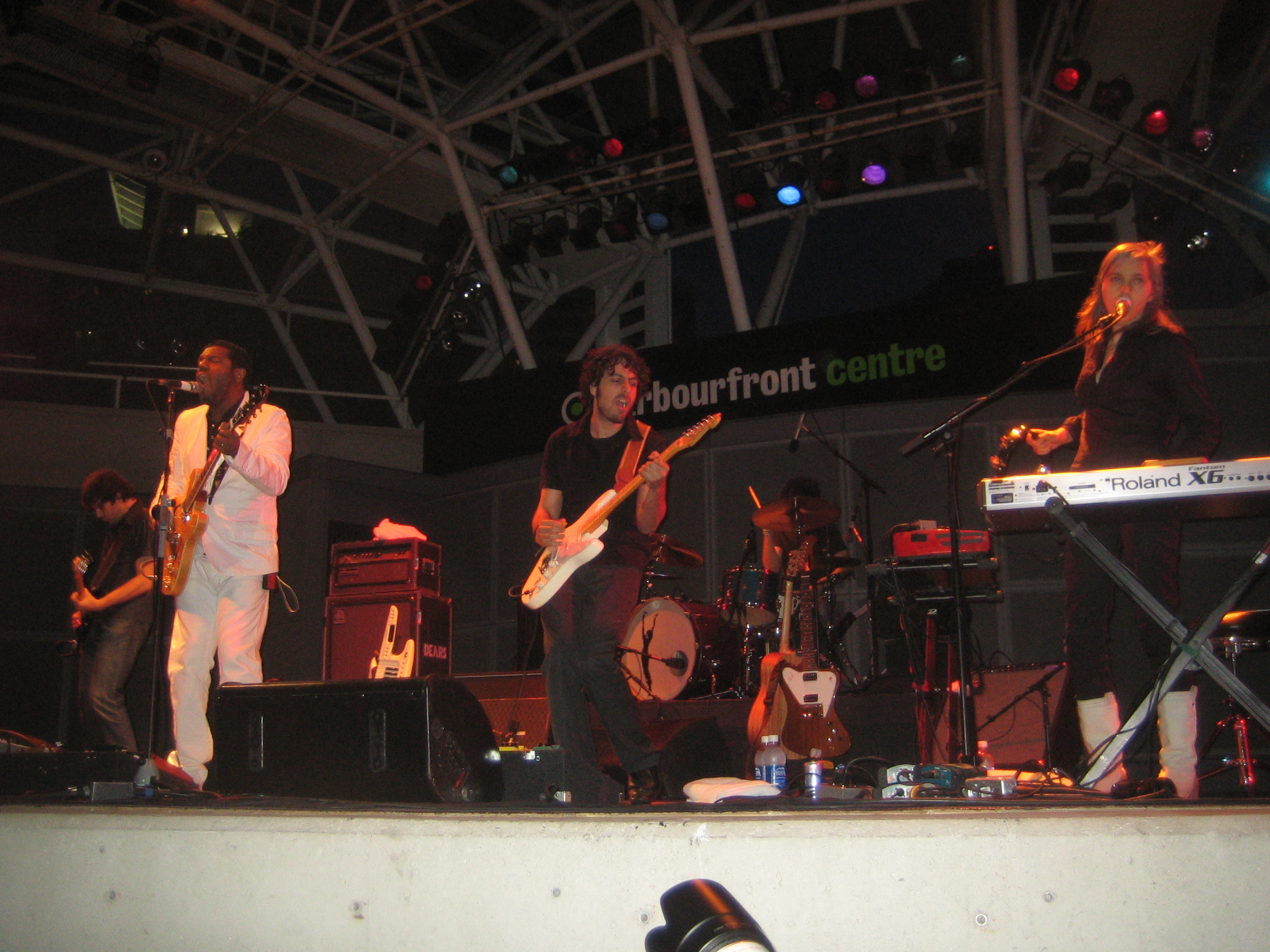
The Dears performing a free concert at Harbourfront in Toronto, Ontario.

- 2016: No Cities Left - Shortlisted: 2016 Slaight Family Polaris Heritage Prize (1996-2005).
- 2011: Degeneration Street – Longlisted: 2011 Polaris Music Prize.
- 2007: Gang of Losers – Shortlisted: 2007 Polaris Music Prize.
- 2007: Gang of Losers – Nominated: GAMIQ Awards – International Career, Best Indie Rock Album, Best Concert categories.
- 2006: Gang of Losers – Nominated: CMW Canadian Independent Music Awards – Favourite Group category.
- 2006: Whites Only Party – Winner: CBC Radio 3's Bucky Awards – Catchiest Beat category.
- 2004: No Cities Left – Nominated in First Round: New Pantheon Music Award.
- 2004: No Cities Left – Nominated: Juno Award – Best New Group category.
- 2004: No Cities Left – Nominated: CMW Canadian Independent Music Awards – Favourite Group category.
- 2003: No Cities Left – Nominated: CASBY Award – Favourite Indie Release.
- 2002: Orchestral Pop Noir Romantique – Winner: MIMI (Montreal Independent Music Initiative) Awards – Best Production category.
- 2001: End of a Hollywood Bedtime Story – Nominated: CMW Canadian Independent Music Awards – Best Alternative Album category.
- 2001: End of a Hollywood Bedtime Story – Nominated: MIMI (Montreal Independent Music Initiative) Awards – Best Album, Best Concert (June 2, 2000), Best Pop Artist categories.

== See also ==
- Music of Canada
- Music of Quebec
- Canadian rock
- List of Canadian musicians
- List of Quebec musicians
- List of bands from Canada
- Culture of Quebec
