= Every Move a Picture =

American electronic rock group

Every Move a Picture is an American electronic rock group.

== Biography ==
The band initially materialized around vocalist/guitarist Brent Messenger, bassist Joey Fredrick, and drummer Dan Aquino. Childhood friends Messenger and Fredrick had been playing in various bands throughout the early 2000s (at times with Aquino), but Every Move a Picture was not officially made active until early 2004.

The quartet was ultimately completed after Portland transplant Allen Davis answered a Craigslist posting and joined up on guitar and keyboards. Soon after, the band recorded three songs at a friend's rehearsal space; their songs found early airplay on local radio and by KROQ's Rodney Bingenheimer in L.A. As their music further filtered across to the UK courtesy of BBC Radio 1. Every Move a Picture had opened shows for the likes of the Kaiser Chiefs, Louis XIV and U2

Also generating notable buzz at 2005's SXSW—all from those first three songs—the band next released the five-song EP Blink and You'll Miss It. This led to their first live radio session at KCRW, and the licensing of various tracks to video games ("Signs of Life" appeared on Juiced and Need For Speed: Carbon) and television shows like One Tree Hill. Before any official release appeared overseas, Every Move a Picture played their first UK gigs to overwhelming response. The London-based label Something in Construction then issued a 7" containing the songs "Signs of Life" and "Chemical Burns," which promptly sold out the week of release.

Touring continued, including a spot at the 2005 Reading and Leeds festivals, and serving as support for June dates with the Futureheads in the U.S. The band also issued a four-song EP Opposition Party with all proceeds going to the Rainforest Action Network. Every Move a Picture finally released their debut album, Heart = weapon, on V2 in July 2006, and supported it the same year on the road with Electric Six.

The band is still active as of 2018, with active touring and recording involved.

== Discography ==
=== Albums ===
- heart = weapon V2 Records

=== EPs ===
- Signs of Life EP
- Opposition Party EP

=== Singles ===
- "Signs of Life"
- "Chemical Burns"
- "On the Edge of Something Beautiful (At 12 AM)"
- "On the Dance Floor"
