= Sweet Homewrecker =

Studio album by Thrush Hermit
- Released: February 11, 1997
- Studio: Easley Recording, Memphis, Tennessee
- Genre: Alternative rock, indie rock
- Length: 47:24
- Label: Elektra
- Producer: Doug Easley

Thrush Hermit chronology
Rock and Roll Detective (1997)	Sweet Homewrecker (1997)	Clayton Park (1999)

Singles from Sweet Homewrecker
- 1. "North Dakota" Released: 1997

Sweet Homewrecker is the first full-length album by Canadian rock band Thrush Hermit. It was released on Elektra Records in 1997.

== Recording and promotion ==
Following several independent EPs, Thrush Hermit signed to Elektra Records in 1996. They drove to Memphis, Tennessee to record Sweet Homewrecker at Easley Studio with Doug Easley. Bassist Ian McGettigan remembered in a 2019 interview that, "It was a pretty scrappy neighbourhood. We would go to the big Kroegers grocery store down the street to get microwave burritos. There were no white people in this area at all."

Due to a lack of interest from Elektra, there was initially no video to support the album. The band eventually decided to make a video themselves for the song "On the Sneak", which aired on Canadian channel MuchMusic in late 1997. The video features McGettigan on lead vocals. While McGettigan and guitarists Joel Plaskett and Rob Benvie handled vocal duties in the band, Plaskett remarked in 2019 that, "There was definitely a push from the label side to spin me as the lead singer. I’m not saying that it wasn’t implied by some people, but Rob was the most prolific person in the band." McGettigan reflected in the same interview, "It just made more sense. When you’re putting $400,000 US into a record, you need to make a star. And I’m sure the record label was thinking, “We’ve got this cute tall guy…” I'm sure they just thought, “How are we gonna sell this record in Des Moines?” You have to make it easy for them."

By the time Thrush Hermit started recording their next album Clayton Park in May 1998, they had already departed Elektra. Plaskett claimed, "It became pretty apparent, pretty quickly after Sweet Homewrecker came out that we weren’t a priority. The album wasn’t even that well received in Canada." McGettigan said, "Third Eye Blind and Sweet Homewrecker came down the pipeline basically at the same time. I’m sure it was like, “Well this I can fucking sell! And this? I don’t know what to do with!”.

== Release ==
Elektra originally issued the album on CD and cassette in 1997. In addition to being released in Canada and the U.S., it was also released in Germany by Elektra. In 2024, it was released on vinyl for the first time by Nova Scotia's Taz Records, who were able to license it from Elektra/Warner.

== Reception ==
Professional ratings
Review scores
Source	Rating
Allmusic	4/5 stars

In his 1997 review, CMJ's Franklin Bruno claimed that the band had "a frustrating mix of good ideas, modest guitar-band values and not-quite-there songwriting and execution." He also observed an "appealingly loose-limbed, live in-the-studio approach, with little interest in studio trickery." Bruno concluded his review by saying, "Like a talented ballplayer with an inconsistent rookie season, Sweet Homewrecker is worthy of attention more for its promise than its objective values." In February 1998, Melissa Andrew of In Music We Trust called it "an album filled with sharp poppy tracks that are the trademark sound of so many other great Canadian Bands" and "one of the best to come out of Canada's East Coast in years."

AllMusic's Gina Boldman gave the album four-out-of-five-stars. She wrote, "Thrush Hermit don't completely fit in the hard rock or post-grunge category -- they've got a punk attitude to their sound, especially on Rob Benvie's tracks -- and on Sweet Homewrecker, their confusion is evident. Their lyrics are sometimes awkward, sometimes quite clever; songs range from pop-rock to heavy guitar-based rock. The single "North Dakota" was probably considered too "heavy" for most U.S. alternative stations in 1997 (though it did well in Canada); nonetheless."

== Track listing ==
1. "Skip the Life" – 3:23
2. "North Dakota" – 3:48
3. "Noosed and Haloed Swear Words" – 3:33
4. "Without You?" – 2:04
5. "Snubbed" – 3:36
6. "Heart Wrenching Man" – 2:43
7. "Puerto Rico" – 3:34
8. "At My Expense" – 2:57
9. "This Week" – 3:13
10. "I'm Sorry If Your Heart Has No More Room" – 3:03
11. "Strange To Be Involved" – 2:50
12. "Darling Don't Worry" – 2:16
13. "On The Sneak" – 2:47
14. "Came and Went" – 7:39

== Personnel ==
- Rob Benvie – Guitar, Vocals
- Cliff Gibb – Drums
- Ian McGettigan – Bass, Vocals
- Joel Plaskett – Guitar, Vocals
