= Junior Boys =

Canadian electronic pop group

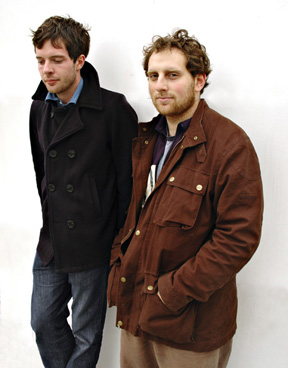

Background information
- Origin: Hamilton, Ontario, Canada
- Genres: Electropop; dance-pop; indietronica; technopop
- Years active: 1999–present
- Labels: Domino, KIN, City Slang
- Members: Jeremy Greenspan; Matt Didemus
- Past members: Johnny Dark

Junior Boys are a Canadian electronic pop group, founded in 1999 in Hamilton, Ontario, by Jeremy Greenspan and Johnny Dark. Dark left the project shortly after, and was replaced by engineer Matt Didemus. The duo initially gained critical praise for their 2003 single "Birthday" and 2004 debut album Last Exit. Their work incorporates disparate influences from 1980s synthpop, UK garage, techno, and R&B.

== History ==
=== Origins–2007: Last Exit and So This Is Goodbye ===
Junior Boys formed in 1999 in Hamilton, Ontario, Canada, as a duo of Jeremy Greenspan and Johnny Dark. Years of collaboration followed and a demo was produced, but after many rejections and near-misses, they were resigned to being bedroom beat constructors. Soon after, Johnny Dark left the band to pursue other interests. Eventually, KIN Records heard their demo at the end of 2002 and commissioned more work from remaining member Greenspan. Hooking up with his engineer, Matt Didemus, he began again, writing more material and pulling an album together. The band are associated with 1980s influences including John Foxx, Orchestral Manoeuvres in the Dark and Prefab Sprout.

The first release Birthday/Last Exit came in October 2003 – a four-track EP with a remix by Fennesz which brought them near-unanimous acclaim. The High Come Down EP followed in February 2004 with a Manitoba (now Caribou) remix and word began to spread. Their debut album, Last Exit (recorded at the end of 2003 by Greenspan and Didemus in Hamilton), was released 21 September 2004 on KIN Records. A reissue on Domino Records featured the Manitoba mix of Birthday, a Fennesz mix of title track, and a new track.

In 2006, Junior Boys reappeared with new releases. A remix of "The Loving Sounds of Static" by Mobius Band was released on the Ghostly International Idol Tryouts 2 compilation on 7 March 2006. "Max", a new original song, was released on the Paper Bag Records compilation See You on the Moon! on 21 March 2006. Their second full-length album, So This Is Goodbye, was released in August 2006 on Domino.

2007 saw the Junior Boys embarking on a North American tour, and then headed to Europe for numerous festivals, continuing into the summer. The remix EP The Dead Horse EP was released in April containing remixes of tracks from So This Is Goodbye. An iTunes exclusive live EP was also released, reminiscent of a John Peel recording, with four live tracks.

Almost a year after its initial release, So This Is Goodbye was re-released as a bonus edition including the original album, and remixes from the singles and the live tracks from the iTunes session.

On 10 July 2007, Junior Boys second album was revealed as being on the shortlist for the 2007 Polaris Music Prize.

=== 2008–2011: Begone Dull Care and It's All True ===
In April 2008, a single on the German Get Physical label was released titled "No Kinda Man", with mixes by Jona and Chloé. The original mix had just been featured on the same label's Body Language Six compilation released in March. Whilst the vinyl version was compiled by the band, the CD version was also mixed by the duo.

In September 2008, Morgan Geist's new album "Double Night Time" was released with five songs featuring Jeremy Greenspan.

On 16 January 2009, Junior Boys announced in an official press release that their third full-length album would be titled Begone Dull Care, and released on 24 March 2009 in Canada, 7 April in the United States and 11 May in Germany. The title and content of the new album was stated to be inspired by the Canadian animator Norman McLaren. A single from the album, "Hazel", was released on Domino Recording Company in April 2009. Junior Boys finally managed to tour Australia in September 2009 as part of the Parklife Festival.

On 9 October 2010, via their Facebook page, they announced that their new album was nearly complete. On 11 March 2011, Junior Boys announced that their new album, It's All True, was released on 13 June 2011.

Luke Winkie at Paste Magazine reviewed It's All True and the album received a score of 7.7 out of ten from the magazine. "If Junior Boys' fourth album It’s All True proves anything, it's that the Ontarian, indie-electro originals will never be fully defrosted. Their stealthy, dampened beat-work has kept them remarkably suave in a subgenre that generally softens up to a dorkier demographic – and seven years since Last Exit the band is as frigidly unflappable as ever, progressing nicely through their expected idiosyncrasies, while continuing to sound effortlessly and solitarily cool."

They were chosen by Caribou to perform at the ATP Nightmare Before Christmas festival that they co-curated in December 2011 in Minehead, England.

=== 2012–2022: Big Black Coat and Waiting Game ===
After the release of It's All True, the duo pursued solo and side projects, which included Jeremy Greenspan's working on music by Caribou and Jessy Lanza. In October 2015, the duo announced their fifth studio album and first release in five years, Big Black Coat. The album was released on the group's new label home, City Slang, in February 2016, and was preceded by two singles in late 2015: the title track, and "Over It". Six years later, they followed this up with their sixth studio album, Waiting Game, in October 2022.

=== 2023–present: The Gore ===
Junior Boys announced a new album titled The Gore set to be released on February 2027. The duo released a single track called "Underneath the Moon" in October 2026.

== Promotions and media ==
In support of their 2006 album So This Is Goodbye, Junior Boys launched a fan-submitted video contest in conjunction with Domino Records and Imeem.com (now defunct). Participants were invited to use any song from So This Is Goodbye as the soundtrack for their original video creations. The winner was to receive a $1000 in cash and prizes.

In October 2006, Junior Boys launched SoThisIsGoodbye.com (no longer held by Junior Boys), an interactive flash website based on the inspiration for the title. "It's about dealing with the kind of goodbyes you say to things all the time that actually don't tear you to pieces" explains Jeremy Greenspan of Junior Boys. Users were invited to post goodbye messages in the spirit of the title and to read those of others.

In December 2006, Junior Boys produced a podcast with interview clips and tracks from So This Is Goodbye. The podcast was featured as part of the Dominocast series of podcasts.

In August 2007, the track "In The Morning" from So This Is Goodbye was featured in Mack Dawg Productions "Picture This" for Finnish professional snowboarder Eero Ettala's video part. "In The Morning" was also used for the "Picture This" trailer.

"So This Is Goodbye" was used in the HBO drama Looking in 2015 as part of Season 2, episode 4, end credit sequence.

== Discography ==
=== Albums ===
- Last Exit (2004, Domino)
- So This Is Goodbye (2006, Domino)
- Begone Dull Care (2009, Domino)
- It's All True (2011, Domino)
- Big Black Coat (2016, City Slang)
- Waiting Game (2022, City Slang)

=== Extended plays ===
- The Dead Horse EP (2007, Domino)
- Kiss Me All Night EP (2016, City Slang/Domino)

=== Singles ===
- "Birthday/Last Exit" (2003)
- "High Come Down" (2004)
- "In the Morning" (2006)
- "No Kinda Man" (2008)
- "Hazel" (2009)
- "Bits & Pieces" (2010)
- "Banana Ripple" (2011)
- "Big Black Coat" (2015)

=== Remixes ===
- Yoko Ono – "Give Me Something" (2010)
- Stars – "Sleep Tonight" - Do You Trust Your Friends? (Remix Album) (2007)
