= Murray Lightburn =

Canadian musician

Murray A. Lightburn
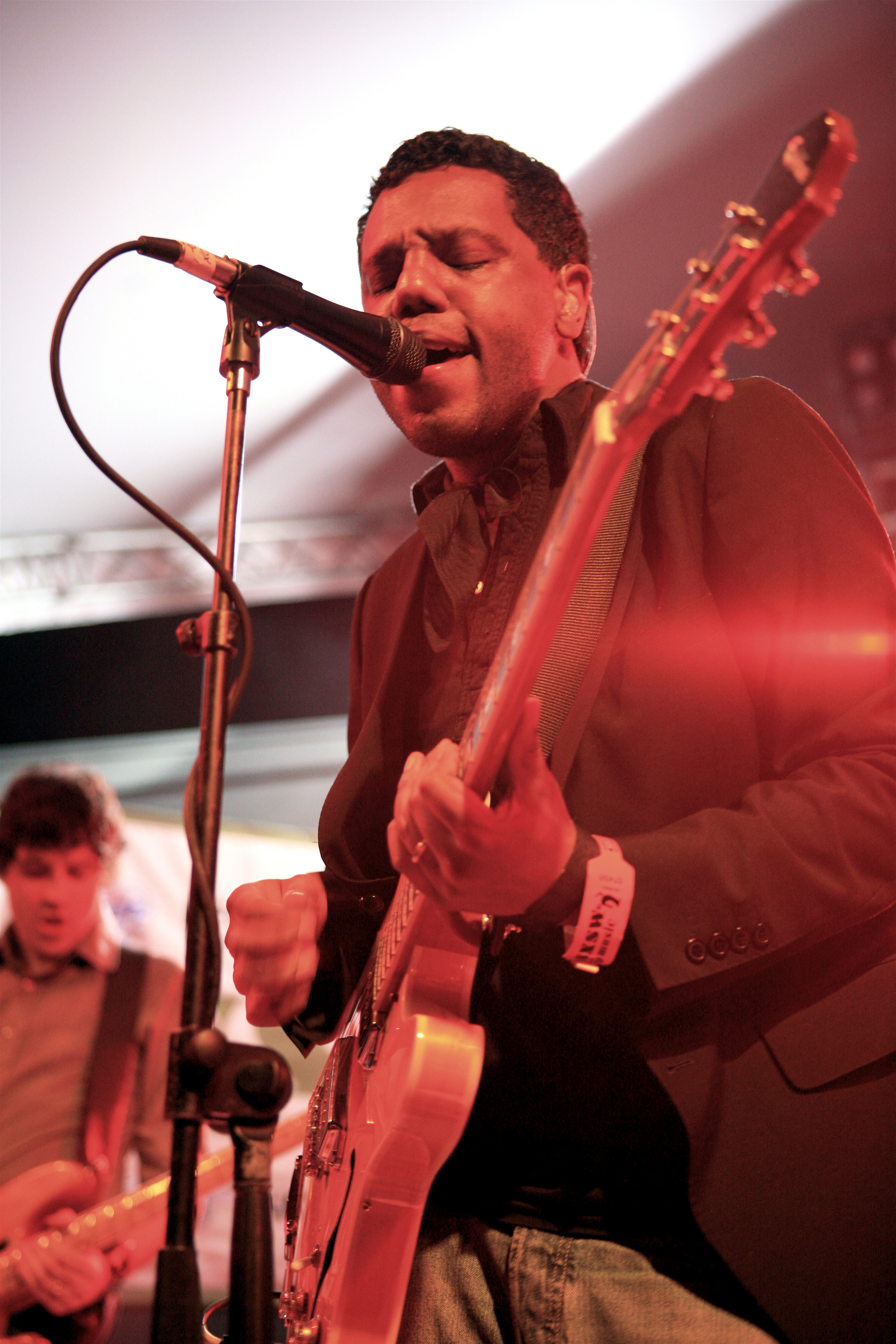
- Lightburn performing with The Dears in London, July 13, 2007.

Background information
- Born: Montréal, Quebec, Canada
- Genre: indie rock
- Occupation: singer-songwriter
- Instruments: vocals, guitar
- Years active: 1995–present

Murray A. Lightburn is a Canadian musician and composer, best known as the lead vocalist and principal songwriter for The Dears.

Lightburn has been called "the black Morrissey" due to his vocal similarity (and shared penchant for somewhat dark lyrics) to the former The Smiths lead singer. Incidentally, The Dears toured as Morrissey's opening act during Morrissey's solo tour in 2006.

In 2013, he released the solo album Mass: Light. His second solo album, Hear Me Out, was released in 2019.

His album Once Upon a Time in Montreal was longlisted for the 2023 Polaris Music Prize.

As a composer, Lightburn has produced original music for films including Any Other Way: The Jackie Shane Story, I Like Movies, and Too Much Sleep. Other credits include scores for TV series Near or Far (to be released in 2024 on CBC Gem), Black Life: Untold Stories, and original soundtrack for We Happy Few including the theme for the Lightbearer DLC.

At the 13th Canadian Screen Awards in 2025, he won the award for Best Original Music in a Documentary for his work on Any Other Way: The Jackie Shane Story.

== Discography ==
=== Studio albums ===
- 2013 - Murray A. Lightburn's MASS:LIGHT
- 2019 - Hear Me Out
- 2023 - Once Upon a Time in Montreal

=== Singles ===
- 2018 Belleville Blues

== Personal life ==
In 2005, Lightburn married fellow band member, keyboardist/singer Natalia Yanchak. They have two children named Neptune and Apollo; Neptune is now a vocalist and bass guitarist in the progressive rock band Mellonella.

Lightburn is also a film photography enthusiast.
