= Beast (Beast album) =

Studio album by Beast
- Released: November 4, 2008
- Genre: Rap rock
- Length: 40:54
- Label: Pheromone Recordings
- Producer: Jean-Phi Goncalves

Beast chronology
| Beast (2008) | Beast (2008) |

Singles from Beast
- 1. "Mr. Hurricane" Released: November 4, 2008; 2. "Out of Control" Released: 2009

Professional ratings
Review scores
| Source | Rating |
|---|---|
| Allmusic | 3/5 stars |

Beast is the debut album by the Canadian band Beast. The album was made available internationally on iTunes on November 4, 2008. While it has been physically released in Canada, international releases have not been announced.

Their self-titled debut album was very well received by critics, including The Globe and Mail, which suggested that Beast “stands an excellent chance of being the next big success story from the Montreal music scene”, and the Toronto Star, which called it “one of the most strikingly original and swaggeringly bad-ass Canadian albums to rear its head in recent memory”. allmusic said the album sounds "a little like Portishead fronted by Annie Lennox" and said that "even if the album isn't groundbreaking, the vocals are top-notch and the production is excellent, a perfect balance between sinister and poppy."

The first single from the album, "Mr. Hurricane", was released as a free Single of the Week on iTunes after the album's release.

In January 2011, the album was certified Gold by the CRIA for selling over 40,000 copies.

== Track listing ==
All tracks are written by Bonifassi, Goncalves, and Wilcox unless otherwise noted.

| No. | Title | Length |
|---|---|---|
| 1. | "Devil" (Bonifassi, Charest, Goncalves, Wilcox) | 3:22 |
| 2. | "Finger Prints" | 4:34 |
| 3. | "Microcyte" | 3:39 |
| 4. | "Interlude 1" | 0:21 |
| 5. | "Mr. Hurricane" | 3:25 |
| 6. | "Out of Control" | 4:35 |
| 7. | "Ashtray" | 4:53 |
| 8. | "Dark Eyes" | 3:48 |
| 9. | "City" | 3:24 |
| 10. | "Arrow" | 3:39 |
| 11. | "Interlude 2" | 0:17 |
| 12. | "Satan" (Bonifassi, Goncalves, Mingus, Wilcox) | 5:34 |

== Personnel ==
=== Beast ===
- Betty Bonifassi – vocals, songwriting
- Jean-Phi Goncalves – all instruments, production

=== Additional musicians ===
- Alex McMahon - piano (3), organ (6, 12), keyboards (9, 12), string arrangements (2)
- Paul Hemmings - guitar (5, 6)
- Mélanie Auclair - cello (2, 6, 10)
- Guido del Fabbro - violin (2, 6, 10)
- Cristobal Tapia de Veer - nylon guitar (7)
- Tyrone Benskin - preacher, raps (9)
- Yann Perreau, Antoine Gratton, Marie-Pierre Fournier, Caroline d'été, Emilie Laforest, Sébastion Nasra, Vance Payn, Frank Deweare - backing vocals (5)
- Benoît Charest - songwriting (1)
- Charles Mingus - original songwriting (12)
- Simon Wilcox - songwriting

=== Credits ===
- Beast - production, mixing, engineering
- Pierre Girard - mixing
- Sébastion Nasra - executive producer, artistic director
- Kim Cooke - A&R consultant
- Phillipe Normand - artwork supervisor
- Marianne Larochelle - photography
- Serge Landau - photography assistant
- Leslie-Ann Thompson - hair and make-up
- Karine Lamontagne (Bonifassi) and Eve Gravel (Goncalves) - stylists
- Jensy White - graphic design
- Adam Ayan - mastering

== Chart positions ==
| Chart (2008) | Peak position |
|---|---|
| Canadian Albums Chart | 25 |
