= Lost in the 80s =

Studio album by the Lost Fingers
- Released: 6 May 2008 (CAN, QC); 27 January 2009 (CAN, elsewhere)
- Genre: gypsy jazz
- Label: Tandem/Distribution Select

Lost in the 80s is the first studio album by Canadian gypsy jazz band the Lost Fingers, released in Quebec on 6 May 2008 and in the remainder of Canada on 27 January 2009. The album consists entirely of the band's renditions of selected popular songs from the 1980s. English lyrics are performed through all tracks on the album except for "Incognito", a French-language song initially performed by Celine Dion.

== Awards and recognition ==
During its Quebec release alone, the album sold over 100 000 units earning platinum certification. It was nominated as Album of the Year for the 2009 Juno Awards.

== Track listing ==
No.	Title	Music	Associated with	Length
1.	"Pump Up the Jam"	Manuela Kamosi, Thomas De Quincey	Technotronic	3:48
2.	"You Give Love a Bad Name"	Jon Bon Jovi, Richie Sambora and Desmond Child	Bon Jovi	3:51
3.	"You Shook Me All Night Long"	Brian Johnson, Angus Young and Malcolm Young	AC/DC	3:09
4.	"Incognito"	Luc Plamondon, Jean-Alain Roussel	Celine Dion	4:13
5.	"Touch Me"	Jon Astrop, Pete Q. Harris, Mark Shreeve	Samantha Fox	3:41
6.	"Part-Time Lover"	Stevie Wonder	Stevie Wonder	3:48
7.	"Fresh"	Claydes Smith, Curtis Williams, George Brown, James L. Bonnefond, James Taylor, Robert Bell, Ronald Bell, Sandy Linzer	Kool & the Gang	4:08
8.	"Billie Jean"	Michael Jackson	Michael Jackson	4:17
9.	"Careless Whisper"	George Michael, Andrew Ridgeley	Wham!	4:53
10.	"Tainted Love"	Ed Cobb	Soft Cell	3:31
11.	"Straight Up"	Elliot Wolff	Paula Abdul	4:05
12.	"Black Velvet"	David Tyson, Christopher Ward	Alannah Myles	5:22
13.	"Joe Le Taxi" (bonus track*)	Étienne Roda-Gil, Franck Langolff	Vanessa Paradis	3:46
14.	"Belleville Rendez-Vous" (bonus track*)	Benoît Charest, Sylvain Chomet.	Béatrice Bonifassi	3:17

* The bonus tracks were only available in the 2009 Canada-wide release.

== Personnel ==
The Lost Fingers
- Alex Morissette – backing vocals, double bass
- Christian Roberge – lead vocals, guitar
- Byron Mikaloff – guitar

== Charts ==
=== Weekly charts ===
Chart (2008)	Peak position
Canadian Albums (Billboard)	2
French Albums (SNEP)	47

=== Year-end charts ===
Chart (2008)	Position
Canadian Albums (Billboard)	16

== Release history ==
Region	Date	Label	Catalogue
Canada, Quebec	6 May 2008	Tandem/Distribution Select	TMUCD5802
Canada, general	27 January 2009	Tandem/Distribution Select	TMUCD5802
Mexico	unknown	unknown	unknown
