= MapleCore Ltd. =

Canadian music company

Cadence Music Group
- Industry: Music & Entertainment
- Founded: 1999
- Headquarters: Toronto, Canada
- Key people: Grant Dexter: CEO
- Divisions: Cadence Recordings; Fontana North; Open Road Recordings; Pheromone Recordings; Known Accomplice; Physical Presents; TicketBreak; Fan Experience; MapleMusic Publishing; Cadence Songs
- Website: www.cadencemusicgroup.com

Cadence Music Group, formerly MapleCore Ltd., is a music company founded in 1999 and located in Toronto, Canada. Cadence Music Group has multiple divisions, five record labels Cadence Recordings, Open Road Recordings, Pheromone Recordings, Physical Presents, and Known Accomplice. They also jointly own distribution arm Fontana North with Universal Music Group, a live ticket services TicketBreak and Fan Experience, and their licensing division called Cadence Songs.

== History ==
=== As MapleMusic.com ===
Cadence Music Group was co-founded in 1999 by entrepreneur Grant Dexter and launched MapleMusic.com, a website where music artists could sell their merchandise online. Through co-founder Andy Maize from the band Skydiggers connections were made to many established artists such as Cowboy Junkies and Sarah Harmer who helped garner attention for the e-commerce site. The Cowboy Junkies were the first artist to sell their CDs and merchandise through the service that now provides online stores for more than 1,000 artists, including Martha Wainwright, Kathleen Edwards, Jann Arden and Chantal Kreviazuk.

The e-commerce portal cooperates with a number of Canadian artists not otherwise associated with the company's MapleMusic Recordings or Open Road Recordings labels to sell their CDs and merchandise through the site.

The company expanded into the ticket service industry by establishing Fan Experience in 2004. Fan Experience is a VIP ticket service powered by MapleMusic.com providing packages such as exclusive seating, artist engagement, and merchandise to fans. The service has worked with bands like Marianas Trench, The Tragically Hip, and Our Lady Peace who previously connected to the company through MapleMusic.com. Working directly with artists, promoters, and management the service creates experiences tailored specifically to the fans.

In March 2016, MapleCore was renamed as Cadence Music Group.

=== Labels ===
The company began to diversify in 2002, establishing MapleMusic Recordings, a full-service record label offering in-house marketing, promotion, publicity, A&R and licensing. The record company operates like a boutique label, handpicking a roster including many Canadian artists such as Joel Plaskett, DJ Champion, and Kathleen Edwards as well international acts including Silversun Pickups and Radiohead while using major label-style strength to market and distribute their artists nationwide. MapleMusic Recordings has an exclusive license with ATO Records, Dangerbird Records, and Downtown Records representing their signed artists with Canada.

In 2003, the country music label Open Road Recordings was launched as a partnership between MapleCore and Ron Kitchener. The sister label to MapleMusic Recordings offers marketing, promotion, publicity, A&R and licensing services to its roster. Open Road Recordings represents, or has represented, a range of artists from emerging talent, established artists and international acts, many via Big Machine Records and Valory Records. Notable Canadian country artists have been launched by the label artists such as Doc Walker, The Wilkinsons, and Johnny Reid. The label has also been the Canadian home to many of the biggest names in country such as Rascal Flatts, Jewel, and Taylor Swift. The Canadian Country Music Association awarded Open Road Recordings with Independent Record Company of the Year from 2004 to 2006, and Record Company of the Year from 2009 to 2012.

Former MapleMusic Recordings General Manager Kim Cooke partnered with MapleCore to establish Pheromone Recordings in 2008. The boutique label features an eclectic roster consisting entirely of Canadian artists such as Elisapie Isaac, The Dears, and their first signed act The New Odds. The company aims to bring independent artists to MapleCore while utilizing the company's infrastructure, including marketing, promotion and publicity. Beast was the label's first new act to receive a Gold certification award for their self-titled album 'Beast'. Among Pheromone's other notable releases is Jason Schneider's 'Have Not Been The Same' compilation, a companion album to the 2011 updated reissue of the Canadian rock history book 'Have Not Been the Same: The Can-Rock Renaissance 1985-1995'. The album proceeds, along with proceeds from an auction of Bob Wiseman's hand-painted Ace Tone Top 5 Keyboard organ went to Kids Help Phone.

Universal Music Canada, a majority shareholder in Cadence Music Group, along with the company's own Fontana North distribute the three labels.

=== Distribution ===
MapleCore established MapleNationwide in 2004 as a distributor for their in house labels. In 2006 it was re-branded as Fontana North after partnering with Fontana Distribution as their Canadian wing. The company provides full marketing, promotional and publicity support, a nationally dedicated sales force and access to the U.S. marketplace for its signed labels and artists. Fontana North has won the Independent Distributor of the Year award at the Canadian Music Industry Awards, part of Canadian Music Week, six years in a row from 2008 to 2013. Fontana North distribute more than 80 labels, including Alligator Records, Daptone Records, Ipecac Recordings, Nuclear Blast, Paper Bag Records, Rise Records, and Warp Records.

=== Ticket services ===
In 2010 MapleCore launched its online ticket service TicketBreak. The service offers ticket sales and distribution to a wide variety of events such as the Barrie Colts, NASCAR Canada, Wet'n'Wild TorontoWild Water Kingdom as well as music festivals and concerts. TicketBreak combines marketing and IT to provide event producers, venue owners, and performers with alternative features such as promotional tracking, database cultivation, marketing support and printed, SMS mobile and ticket options. In 2012 a widget feature was introduced to the service allowing customers to sell tickets directly on their Facebook pages, creating an easy access way for fans to purchase tickets online.

== See also ==
- List of MapleMusic Recordings artists
- MapleMusic Recordings
- Fontana North
- Open Road Recordings
