= Nicholas Young (figure skater) =

Canadian figure skater

Personal information
- Born: March 3, 1982 (age 44) Pembroke, Ontario
- Height: 1.65 m (5 ft 5 in)

Figure skating career
- Country: Canada
- Skating club: QC Section, Montreal
- Retired: 2007

Nicholas Young (born March 3, 1982) is a Canadian former competitive figure skater. He is the 2003 Nebelhorn Trophy champion, a two-time Karl Schäfer Memorial bronze medallist, and a medallist at three ISU Junior Grand Prix events. He competed at three World Junior Championship, achieving his best result, seventh, in 2002.

Young studied political science at Concordia University. He married Mylène Brodeur in June 2010.

== Programs ==
Season	Short program	Free skating
2006–07	Man with a Harmonica by Ennio Morricone; Chill'em All by DJ Champion; Sergio's Trio; No Heaven; Tawoumga	Harlem Nocturne by Earle Hagen; Four Rooms by Combustible Edison, Juan García Esquivel; Corpse Bride by Danny Elfman; Les Poupées Russes
2005–06	Étude Op. 10, No. 12; Étude Op. 10, No. 11 by Frédéric Chopin	Walkin Boss; Blues for Mothers; My Manne Shelley; Peter Gunn by Henry Mancini
2004–05	Dueling Banjos; Help, Help by A. Smith, J. D. Williams	Peter Gunn; Walkin Boss; Blues for Mothers by Henry Mancini
2003–04	Duel by Tonči Huljić performed by Bond	Kodo; Cherry Blossom by Hugo Chouinard
2001–02	Allegro Moderato; Scene; Finale by Yuli Turovsky	Music by Wojciech Kilar; Interview with the Vampire by Elliot Goldenthal; Main Title Theme; To the Vaults by Claudio Gizzi
2000–01	Zorba the Greek by Mikis Theodorakis	The Man in the Iron Mask by Nick Glennie-Smith

== Competitive highlights ==
GP: Grand Prix; JGP: Junior Grand Prix

International
Event	98–99	99–00	00–01	01–02	02–03	03–04	04–05	05–06	06–07
Four Continents								11th	
GP Cup of China						7th			
GP NHK Trophy							6th		
GP Skate America							7th		WD
Golden Spin					5th				
Nebelhorn Trophy						1st		7th	
Schäfer Memorial						3rd	3rd		
International: Junior
Junior Worlds		18th	10th	7th					
JGP Final			4th						
JGP Canada		4th							
JGP Czech Rep.			3rd						
JGP France			2nd						
JGP Italy				5th					
JGP Netherlands				3rd					
JGP Slovenia		6th							
National
Canadian Champ.	3rd J	1st J	7th	7th	5th	5th	18th	5th	13th
J = Junior level; WD = Withdrew
