= Let It All Out (disambiguation) =

Let It All Out is a 1966 Jazz album by Nina Simone.

Let It All Out may also refer to:

- "Let It All Out", a 2009 trance single by British producer Lange
- "Let It All Out", a track from the 2004 album Mmhmm by American pop punk band Relient K
- Let It All Out, a 2012 album by Canadian band Plaster
