= One for the Boys =

One for the Boys may refer to:

- "One for the Boys", campaign which teaches men about male cancers, chaired by Samuel L. Jackson
- One for the Boys (album), an album by Connie Francis
- "One for the Boys", song from Brian Wilson (album)
- "One for the Boys", song by hardcore band Bane from The Note

== See also ==
- One of the Boys (disambiguation)
