= Plaster (disambiguation) =

Plaster is a building material used for coating walls and ceilings.

Plaster may also refer to:

- Adhesive bandage or sticking plaster, a medical dressing for small wounds
- Poultice, a soft moist mass applied to the body
- Plaster (band), a Canadian electro-jazz/electro-rock band

== People with the surname Plaster ==
- John Plaster (born 1949), American soldier
- George Plaster (born 1959), American broadcaster
