= Peter Hegedus =

Hungarian/Australian writer, director and producer

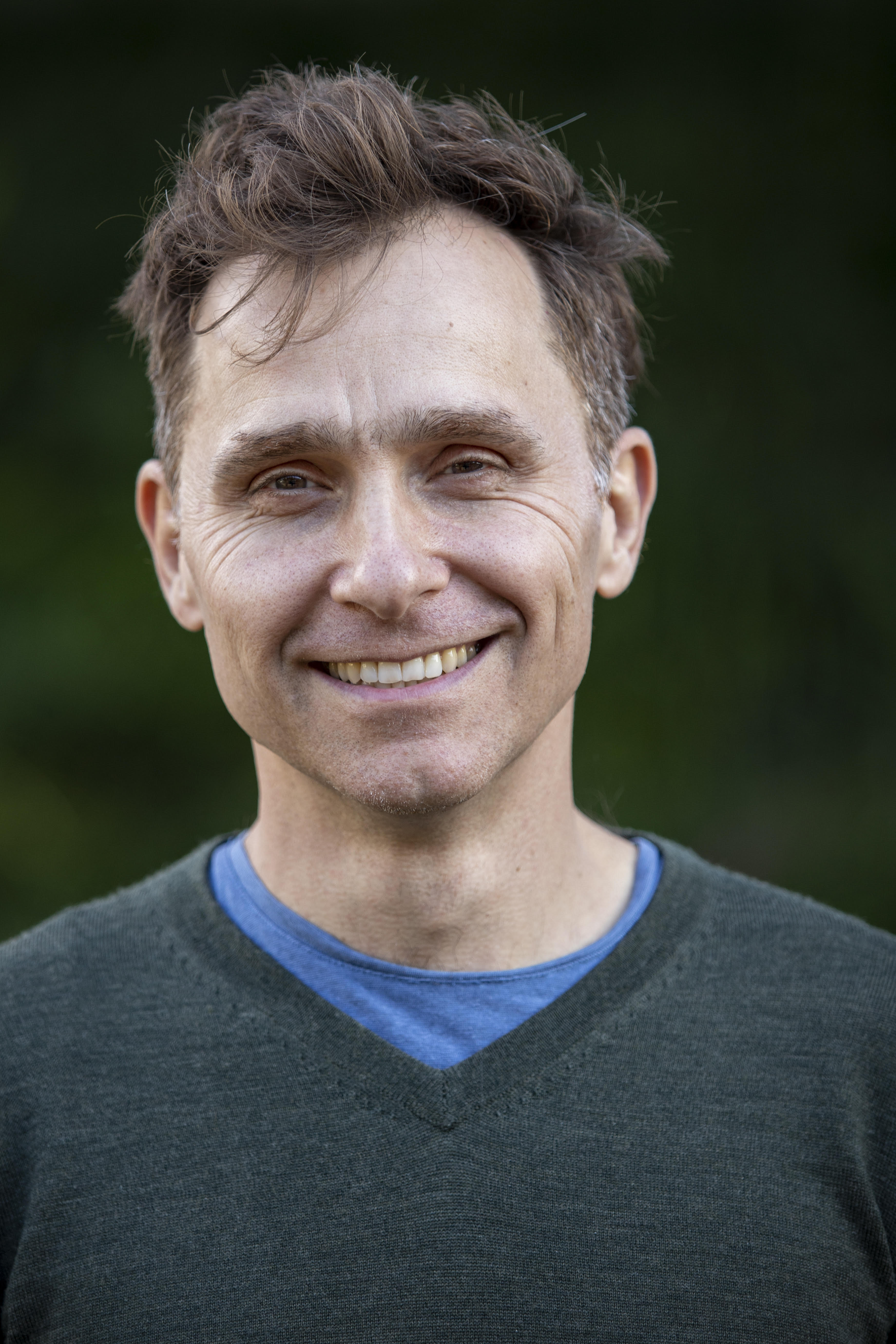
- Born: 21 August 1976 (age 50); Budapest, Hungary
- Education: Griffith University
- Occupations: Film Director/Producer and Deputy Director of Research & Engagement at Griffith Film School

Peter Hegedüs (born 21 August 1976) is a Hungarian-Australian writer, director and producer of both documentary and fiction films. He is the grandson of the former Prime Minister of Hungary, András Hegedüs. Hegedüs' work explores critical social justice issues. His most recent film, Sorella's Story, was selected to screen at the Venice International Film Festival.

== Early life ==
Peter Hegedüs was born in Budapest, Hungary and moved with his mother and his sister to Brisbane, Australia in 1991. In 1995, Hegedüs was accepted into the film program at the Queensland College of Art. At twenty-one, he produced and directed his first major project, a TV documentary, which marked the beginning of a professional career in filmmaking.

== Professional career ==
Hegedüs' first film, Grandfathers and Revolutions (1999), was a TV documentary about his own grandfather. András Hegedüs is the ex-Prime Minister of Hungary, and he played a controversial role in the Hungarian Revolution of 1956. The documentary was produced and directed by Hegedüs for SBS TV Australia. The film won multiple awards and screened at international festivals, including the United Nations Association Film Festival (2000).

In 2002, Hegedüs formed Soul Vision Films Pty Ltd. The company has produced a variety of films with the philosophy of providing insight into the human condition. A Fisherman’s Story (2003), is an early film produced through the company, and is a Hungarian-Australian co-production based around the ecological disaster in Hungary in 2000. The film was shortlisted for the 2004 Academy Awards, along with a number of other international a accolades.

In 2004, Hegedüs made his first short drama, Redemption (2004), which captures the nine most important minutes of a man's life in a single take. The critically acclaimed film was screened at the annual conference of the National Coalition to Abolish the Death Penalty accompanying the documentary Fahrenheit 9/11 by Michael Moore.

In the mid-2000s, Hegedüs started to expand his work and focus on social impact documentaries. He worked with major Australian not-for-profit foundations, such as the Micah Projects Inc. and the Australian Suicide Prevention Foundation.

Hegedüs co-produced, directed and wrote My America (2011), a feature documentary exploring an outsiders perspective on the American dream. My America received a favourable review by Richard Kuipers ina publication of Variety. During the same year, Hegedüs made an observational documentary for ABC TV, The Trouble With St Mary’s (2011). This film follows the life of a Catholic priest who is sacked by the Vatican for unorthodox practices. The film was selected to compete in the inaugural BIFFDOCS competition at the Brisbane International Film Festival in 2011.

In 2012, Hegedüs wrote and directed the award-winning short film Welcome to the Lucky Country (2012), a dark comedy about the plight of asylum seekers in Australia. The film won the Audience Choice award at the Brisbane Backyard Film Festival and was picked up for educational distribution in Australia. Hegedüs featured as part of The Courier Mail's "Queensland’s 50 Best and Brightest People".

Hegedüs was commissioned in 2014 to create a series of short documentaries entitled Big Stories, Small Towns, a selection of short films highlighting the personal stories of individuals in the town of Beaudesert, Queensland.

In 2016, Hegedüs produced and directed Éva (2016), a short documentary about Holocaust survivor Éva Fahidi. This film screened at the 2016 St Kilda Short Film Festival. Peter also co-directed Strudel Sisters (2016) with Jaina Kalifa. The short documentary selected for Hot Docs International Documentary Festival as well as the Sydney Film Festival. Strudel Sisters won the 2016 Devour! Golden Tine Award for Best Short Documentary. Both Éva and Strudel Sisters were nominated for best documentary at the St Kilda Short Film Festival.

Hegedüs lead an Australian-Hungarian co-production, LILI (2019). This compelling film exploring transgenerational trauma affecting a family across three continents and generations. The film screened at Krakow Film Festival, Sydney Film Festival, and Brisbane International Film Festival. It won Best Documentary at the prestigious Hungary Film Critics Awards 2020, and was also nominated for best documentary at the Australian Directors Guilds Awards.

Hegedüs’ more recent work, Emmi (2021), garnered critical acclaim amongst many international festivals. The film achieved the Award of Excellence in the Canada Shorts Film Festival 2021, as well as the Gold Award Narrative Short in the International Independent Film Awards 2021.

In 2021, Hegedüs delved into new territory with an innovative short drama film, Sorella’s Story (2021), where he used 360° immersive technology to represent the Latvian Skede Massacre of 1941. The film has been selected to compete at the prestigious Venice International Film Festival in September 2022, in the Venice Immersive section. The ABC will be airing a companion documentary, also created by Hegedüs, which details the making of Sorella’s Story. This documentary is titled In Their Name, and includes conversations between the filmmaker and 92-year-old Latvian Australian, Ethel Davies, who lost family members in the tragedy.

Alongside his decorated film career, Hegedüs has also been employed by Griffith Film School since 2013. He is currently the Deputy Director for Research and Engagement, and he continually contributes to the prestigious film journal Metro Magazine.

== Awards and achievements ==
2022 - Sorella’s Story - 360° immersive short drama Official selection at the Venice International Film Festival

2021 - Emmi - short drama Official Selection at Toronto Indie Shorts 2021 Finalist in the Pigeon International Film Festival 2021 Official Selection at International Social Change Film Festival 2021 Semi Finalist in the Tokyo Shorts 2021 Award of Excellence in the Canada Shorts Film Festival 2021 Gold Award Narrative Short in the international Independent Film Awards 2021

2016 – Strudel Sisters – short documentary (co-director)

- Devour! Golden Tine award for best short documentary
- Nominated for Best Documentary at the St Kilda Short Film Festival
- Official Selection at the Sydney Film Festival
- Official Selection at the Hot Docs Canadian International Documentary Festival

2016 – Éva – short documentary (producer, director)

- Nominated for Best Documentary at the St Kilda Short Film Festival

2012 – Welcome to the Lucky Country – short film (writer, director)

- Audience Choice award at the Brisbane Backyard Film Festival

2011 – Awarded the Griffith University Alumni Recognition Award for his achievements in documentary filmmaking.

2011 – The Trouble with St Mary's – feature documentary (writer, director)

- Official selection at Brisbane International Film Festival (additionally selected to compete for the BIFFDOCS award).

2011 – My America – feature documentary (co-producer, writer, director)

- Official selection at Brisbane International Film Festival, Canberra International Film Festival, Global Peace Film Festival, Mumbai Film Festival and Sydney Film Festival.

2008 – Awarded the Doctor of Visual Arts from Griffith University.

2005 – Hole in the Wall – short drama (Writer/director)

- Best screenplay and best actor at Queensland Short Film Festival
- Official selection Brisbane International Film Festival and Cleveland International Film Festival

2004 – Redemption – short drama (Writer/director)

- Official selection at Rhode Island International Film Festival, Brisbane International Film Festival, Great Lakes Film Festival, the Hawaii International Film Festival and Ashville International Film Festival.

2003 – Inheritance, a Fisherman's Story – A feature-length documentary for SBS TV Australia, RTBF, Lichtpunt (Producer, writer, and director)

- Short-listed for an Academy Award 2004
- Grand Prize at the Global Peace Film festival
- Grand Prize at Real Life on Film Festival
- Special Jury Prize – International Scientific Film Festival, Hungary
- Hungarian Film Critics Award for Best Documentary 2003

1999 – Grandfathers and Revolutions A 52-minute documentary for SBS TV, Australia (Producer, writer and director)

- Grand Prix at Brussels International Independent Film Festival, Belgium
- Crystal Heart Award at Heartland Film Festival, USA
- Honorary diploma and best documentary by student jury at the 37th Kraków Film Festival, Poland
- Grand Prize for best Television documentary at the 14th Pärnu International Documentary and Anthropology Film Festival, Estonia
