= One of the Guys =

One of the Guys may refer to:

== Film and television ==
- One of the Guys (film), a 2018 Canadian documentary film
- One of the Guys, a 1998 TV movie in the Billy the Cat series
- "One of the Guys", a 1999 episode of Pepper Ann
- "One of the Guys", a 2003 episode of Lizzie McGuire

== Music ==
- "One of the Guys", a song by Kellie Pickler from the 2006 album Small Town Girl
- "One of the Guys", a 1967 song by MC5
- "One of the Guys", a song by Terri Clark on the 2004 album Greatest Hits 1994–2004
- "One of the Guys", a song from the 2001 musical Peggy Sue Got Married

== Other uses ==
- One of the Guys: Girls, Gangs and Gender, a 2001 non-fiction book by criminologist Jody Miller
- One of the Guys, a 1988 book by Harry Stein

== See also ==
- One of the Boys (disambiguation)
- Just One of the Guys, a 1985 film
