= Live (Champion album) =

Live album by Champion et ses G-Strings
- Released: 2007
- Recorded: 2006
- Genre: Electronica
- Label: Saboteur Records

Champion et ses G-Strings chronology
The Remix Album (2006)	Live (2007)	Resistance (2009)

Live is a live recording by Champion et ses G-Strings (live moniker for DJ Champion and his guitarists), released in 2007 on Saboteur Records. The package contains two discs, one in CD format and one in NTSC DVD format with no region coding. The album features a live performance featuring tracks from Champion's 2004 debut album, Chill'em All.

== Track listing ==
=== CD ===
1. "NnGg"
2. "Tawoumga"
3. "Two Hoboes"
4. "Die In Peace"
5. "Barry's Beach"
6. "Keep On"
7. "No Heaven"
8. "Sergio's Trio"
9. "Feeling Good"
10. "The Plow"

=== DVD ===
==== Show ====
1. "Intro"
2. "NnGg"
3. "Tawoumga"
4. "Two Hoboes"
5. "Die In Peace"
6. "Barry's Beach"
7. "Keep On"
8. "No Heaven"
9. "Sergio's Trio"
10. "Feeling Good"
11. "The Plow"
12. "Credits"

==== Extras ====
1. "Documentary"
2. "Epilogue"
3. "Fan Cam 1"
4. "Fan Cam 2"
5. "Fan Cam 3"
6. "DJ Cam 1"
7. "DJ Cam 2"
8. "Teaser"

== Technical specifications ==
Français / English
16:9 • PCM Stereo • Dolby Digital 5.1
DVD is NTSC and fits All Regions
Filmed in HD at the Montreal Metropolis on December 14, 2006.

The DVD also contains a Sign Guide in the Extras Section (used by Champion on stage to command the guitarists). This shows images only.
