= Beast (Canadian band) =

Canadian electronic music duo

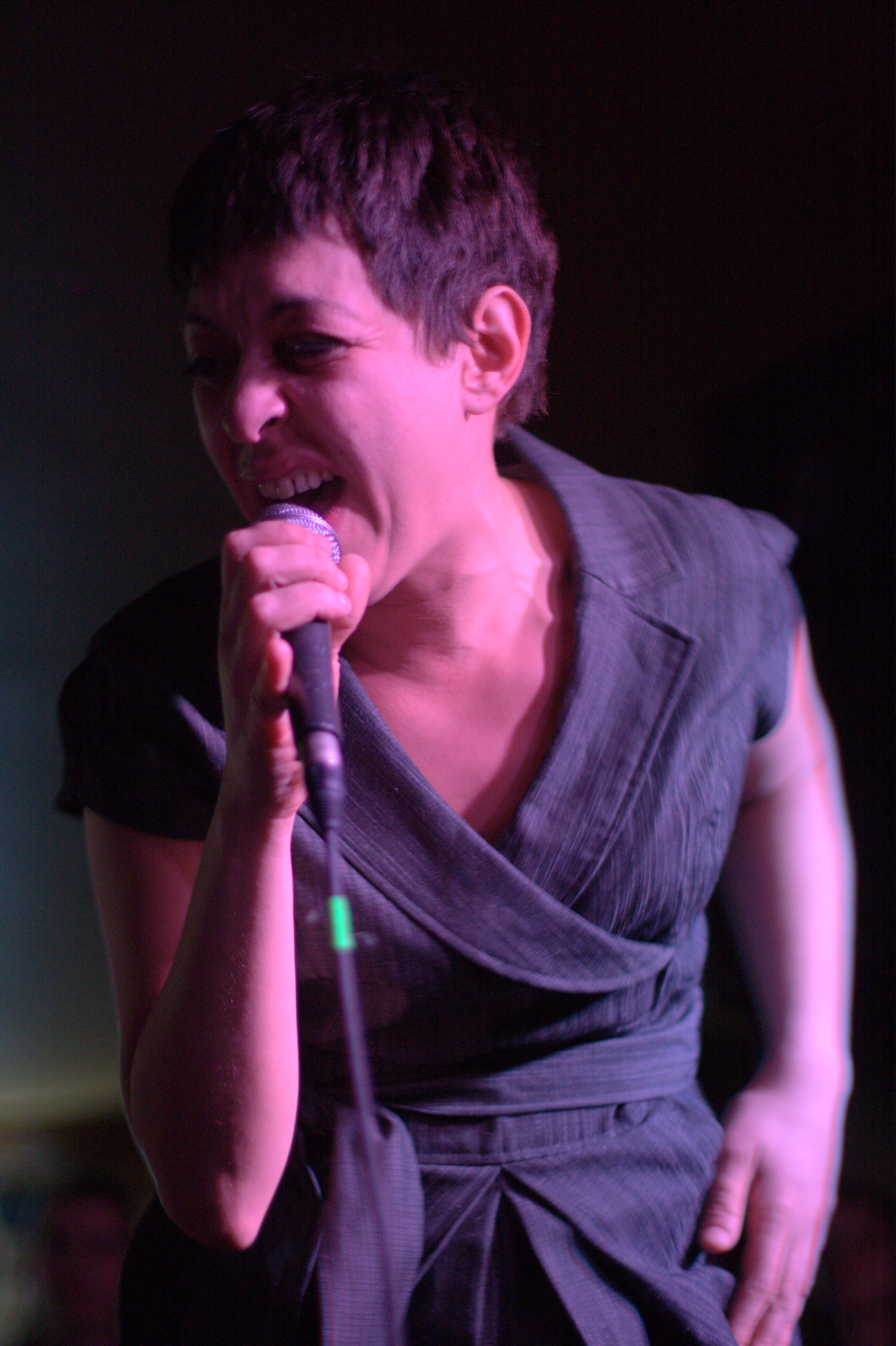
- Béatrice Bonifassi of Beast performing in 2009

Background information
- Origin: Montreal, Canada
- Genres: Electronic; trip hop; rap rock; electronic rock
- Years active: 2006–2010
- Label: Pheromone Recordings
- Past members: Betty Bonifassi; Jean-Phi Goncalves

Beast was a Canadian electronic music duo based out of Montreal. Its members were vocalist and lyricist Béatrice Bonifassi and composer/producer Jean-Philippe Goncalves. Bonifassi was the main songwriter for the band and the music was composed and produced by Goncalves.

Beast was described as "an experimental hip hop project filled with psychedelic trip hop-style electronica, aggressive guitars and loud drum beats," or (as Bonifassi describes it) "trip rock".

== History ==
Bonifassi and Goncalves, both originally from France, were active members in the Montreal music scene, and had each been making music for about 20 years by the time they began collaborating musically. Bonifassi had previously worked with such local musicians as composer and saxophonist, François D'Amours, DJ/techno musician Champion, and yet another French expat rock musician, Deweare. Jean-Phi Goncalves, a percussionist and record producer, had produced albums for Quebec musicians such as Pierre Lapointe, Jean-Pierre Ferland, Ariane Moffatt and Daniel Bélanger as well as American recording artist Lauryn Hill. He also played percussion for the singer Dumas and for Montreal bands Afrodizz and Plaster.

The pair first worked together on a project for the video game company Ubisoft in 2006. The resulting sound was angrier than either artist was used to: "The angry message is about letting the beast out that's inside, because in society you're not allowed to be emotive or sensitive. The feelings of the moment when we were writing were mostly sadness and anger," said Bonifassi in an interview with Canadian music news magazine, Chart.

Their first performance was on March 1, 2008, at the after-party for the Montreal International Music Initiative Awards, or MIMI Awards. They also performed at two separate venues during the 2008 NXNE festival in Toronto; the Canadian news magazine Chart gave Beast "highest marks" for their performances at the festival. In late 2008, the duo toured with British Columbia dance-punk band You Say Party! We Say Die!

Beast's self-titled debut album was made available internationally on iTunes on November 4, 2008, and their first single, "Mr. Hurricane", was offered for free on iTunes as the Single of the Week in 6 major markets including the US, the UK, France, and Australia. Bonifassi's vocal stylings on the album leaned towards rap and spoken-word. Canadian singer-songwriter Simon Wilcox also assisted Bonifassi (whose native language is French) with Beast's lyrics, which are all performed in English. "Simon really understood my dark side and the sadness of the moment," says Bonifassi. "I really wanted to sing something lyrically rich and powerful."

In 2010, the video for the single "Mr. Hurricane" was nominated for the Grammy Award for Best Music Video but lost to The Black Eyed Peas.

In 2010, the song "Satan" played during the closing credits of an episode of the HBO show Hung. In 2011, the song "Mr. Hurricane" was used in the closing credits of "In Sickness", an episode of the television series The Good Wife. "Satan" was used in two episodes of The Good Wife in 2013.

== Dissolution ==
At the end of 2010, Bonifassi and Goncalves announced that they would be taking an indefinite break from the Beast project. Goncalves stated that the split was not due to any sort of quarrel, but due to lagging album sales, frustration with the record industry, the tiresome effects of touring, and family commitments.

Goncalves returned to Plaster. In 2011, Bonifassi performed at the Festival Montréal en lumière in February, and she held two performances at the 2011 Les FrancoFolies de Montréal music festival on June 17 and 18.

== Discography ==
=== Albums ===
Year	Album details	Peak	Certifications (sales thresholds)
Year	Album details	CAN	Certifications (sales thresholds)
2008	Beast: Released: 2008; Label: Pheromone Recordings	25	CAN: Gold

=== Singles ===
Year	Single	Peak	Album
Year	Single	CAN	Album
2008	"Mr. Hurricane"	-	Beast
2008	"Out of Control"	-	Beast
