= The Line (TV series) =

Canadian television drama series

- Created by: George F. Walker; Dani Romain
- Starring: Ron White; Daniel Kash; Clé Bennett; Wes Williams; Von Flores; Sarah Manninen; Sharon Lawrence; Ed Asner; Linda Hamilton; Tasha Lawrence; Yanna McIntosh; Milton Barnes; Shawn Singleton; Alison Sealy-Smith
- Opening theme: "No Heaven" by Champion
- Country of origin: Canada
- Original language: English
- No. of seasons: 1
- No. of episodes: 15

Production
- Executive producers: George F. Walker; Dani Romain; Debbie Nightingale
- Producer: Norman Denver
- Running time: 60 minutes

Original release
- Network: Movie Central; The Movie Network
- Release: March 16 – June 22, 2009

The Line is a Canadian television drama series, which debuted on Movie Central and The Movie Network on March 16, 2009. It centred on two morally ambiguous police officers in the Scarborough district of Toronto.

The series, an expansion of George F. Walker's theatrical play Adult Entertainment, was originally announced under the working title The Weight. It was created Walker and Dani Romain, produced by The Nightingale Company, and shot by Richmond Street Films. It was originally shot as two distinct seasons of seven and eight episodes respectively, but aired as one continuous 15-episode run.

The show was commonly compared by Canadian television critics to the American crime drama series Brotherhood and The Wire.

== Characters ==
- Max (Ron White) and Donny (Daniel Kash) are police officers dealing with the drug network in their precinct. Frustrated by the limitations and regulations of conventional police work, Max regularly steps outside the bounds of legality by pursuing his own tactics, while Donny has been so torn apart by the job that he spends most of his time drunk and lounging around a seedy motel, only occasionally going out on — and usually messing up — the actual police duties given to him by Max.
- Carlos (Clé Bennett) is a drug dealer recently paroled from prison, struggling to rebuild his life but caught in a turf war between rival drug kingpins Andre (Wes Williams) and Eddie (Von Flores). He suffers from stress-induced migraines and stomach pains.
- Lucie (Sarah Manninen) is Carlos' ex-girlfriend. A former addict who's gone clean and intends to stay that way, she and her daughter Jamie (Laytrel McMullen) want nothing to do with Carlos after he's released from prison, but they eventually attempt to reconcile.
- Giles (Dwain Murphy) is Carlos' brother, who works as a security guard at the store where Lucie works as a cashier. Although uninvolved in Carlos' criminal activity, he is gunned down and killed by Eddie's crime network as a warning to Carlos — but Carlos continues to see and have conversations with him after his death.
- Karen (Yanna McIntosh) is Max's wife, whom he married after investigating the murder of her first husband. They have a tense relationship marked by Karen's belief that Max only married her as a "social work" project to save her and her children from Being Black. When married to her first husband, she lived in the same building as Carlos and Lucie.
- Jayne (Sharon Lawrence) is a burned-out legal aid lawyer, and Max's mistress with whom he has regular sex dates at the motel.
- Pam (Tasha Lawrence) is Donny's ex-wife. Since leaving Donny, she and her daughter Emma (Vivien Endicott-Douglas) are living with Jayne.
- Hermie (Milton Barnes) and Philippe (Shawn Singleton) are Carlos' dimwitted cousins, who invariably mess up anything Carlos asks them to do.
- Andre (Wes Williams) Drug boss with anger management issues. Hands-on, efficient businessman.
- Eddie (Von Flores) Stubborn, volatile dealer with unknown connections.
- Joe (Brandon McGibbon), Lucie's brother, is a junkie who's also usually hanging around Carlos waiting for his next fix. Thoroughly addled by his drug habit, he has a difficult time remembering anything — including, as he tells Carol at one point, whether or not he's gay.
- Cecil (Alison Sealy-Smith) is the superintendent in Lucie's building. Fed up with the crime and violence in her backyard, she is vocal in telling off the neighbourhood criminals.
- Andy (Chris Owens) is Donny's childhood friend, and the manager of the motel. Donny knows, but doesn't care, that Andy is really just the front person for a money-laundering operation.
- Carol (Linda Hamilton) is Andy's sister. She briefly comes to stay at the motel after having been beaten up, purportedly by her husband, but is in fact a con woman who has stolen $46,000 from Steamboat (George Buza), a biker and loan shark.
- Patrick (Ed Asner) is Jayne's senile father. He comes to live with Jayne after escaping the nursing home where he had been living.
- Sal (Conrad Pla) and Leon (Patrick Gallagher) are undercover policemen working inside Eddie's crime network.
- Currie (Eugene Clark) is Max and Donny's precinct captain.

== Production notes ==
Filming began at Don Mills Collegiate Institute in Don Mills, Toronto in early August 2007.

The program's theme song, "No Heaven", is performed by electronic musician Champion, with Betty Bonifassi on vocals. The song was previously released as a single from Champion's 2004 album Chill'em All.

== International syndication ==
Country	TV network	Schedule
France	Orange cinéchoc	Starting Thursday, March 5, 2009, at 8:40 PM
Brazil	Globosat HD	Starting Mondays, February 14, 2011, at 10:00 PM
Portugal	MOV	Starting Friday, May 20, 2011, at 10:30 PM
