= Belleville Rendez-vous (song) =

2003 song from the film Les Triplettes de Belleville

"Belleville Rendez-vous" is a song from the 2003 animated film Les Triplettes de Belleville, with music by Benoît Charest and lyrics by Sylvain Chomet. It was performed "in character" in the film by Béatrice Bonifassi.

== Description ==
The soundtrack album includes two versions of the song, one in French and the other in English, both performed by -M- (a.k.a. Matthieu Chedid). It was nominated for an Academy Award for Best Song and has subsequently been covered by the male duo the Lost Fingers and the female trio Rock Paper Scissors. Another version of the song, subtitled "maquette", or "demo", is also included on the soundtrack and sung by Béatrice Bonifassi, who also provided the singing voice of the triplets.

Béatrice Bonifassi, Benoît Charest, DJ Champion, and others performed the song live at the 2004 Academy Awards. In 2013, Charest and the Terrible Orchestre de Belleville played the song at a Montreal screening of the film, to mark the tenth anniversary of its Oscar nomination.

== Music video ==
The music video, which is available in French and English versions, shows -M- visiting a psychiatrist. As he tells his troubles in song, ghosts with heads resembling his start appearing and dancing on screen. The mental troubles of -M- begin to take their toll as he stands and dances wildly to the dance of the ghosts, much to the fear of the psychiatrist, who slowly walks away to keep his distance. The music video ends with -M- being grabbed by medical personnel, with one of them tranquilizing him before they take him away.
