= Shawn Singleton =

Canadian actor and musician

Shawn Singleton is a Canadian actor and musician. His television roles have included the series Lord Have Mercy!, The Line, Doomstown, Platinum and Instant Star, as well as guest appearances in Flashpoint and Da Kink in My Hair. He also had minor roles in the films Four Brothers and Get Rich or Die Tryin'.

Singleton was also a producer and DJ for the Canadian hip hop band Baby Blue Soundcrew, aka Singlefoot or Singleton.

== Filmography ==
=== Film ===
Year	Title	Role	Notes
2005	Four Brothers	Victor Hoodlum	
2005	Get Rich or Die Tryin'	Marcus' Relative	

=== Television ===
Year	Title	Role	Notes
2004–2005	Da Boom Crew	Additional voice	13 episodes
2005	Tilt	Grip	Episode: "The Game"
2005	Totally Spies!	Tripple Threat	Episode: "Evil Airlines Much?"
2005–2006	Instant Star	T-Bone	3 episodes
2006	Doomstown	Ashcroft	Television film
2008	Da Kink in My Hair	Eddie	Episode: "Me Throw Me Corn But Me No Call No Fowl"
2009	Flashpoint	Theo 'Tug' Watts	Episode: "Exit Wounds"
2009	The Line	Phillipe	14 episodes
2016	Show Offs	Manuel	Television film
2016	Parsnip Powers	Sam	Television film
