= Doomstown =

2006 Canadian television film

- Written by: David Sutherland
- Directed by: David Sutherland
- Starring: K. C. Collins; Mark Taylor; Genelle Williams; Shakura S'Aida; Yanna McIntosh; Shawn Singleton; Zainab Musa; Kristin Fairlie
- Theme music composer: Mischa Chillak
- Country of origin: Canada
- Original language: french

Production
- Producer: Susan Murdoch
- Editor: Stephen Lawrence
- Running time: 120 minutes

Original release
- Network: CTV
- Release: November 6, 2006

Doomstown is a Canadian television movie, which aired in 2006 on CTV. Set in the Mount Olive-Silverstone-Jamestown neighbourhood in the Rexdale area of Toronto, Ontario, the film explores the issue of gang violence in Rexdale.

Doomstown was written and directed by Sudz Sutherland. Its cast includes K. C. Collins who played Kevin 'Jedi' Barrows, Mark Taylor who played Mike "Twist" Twistleton, Genelle Williams who played Monica, Clé Bennett played Money, Shakura S'Aida, Yanna McIntosh played Pat Barrows, Shawn Singleton, Zainab Musa and Kristin Fairlie who played Kelly.

== Plot ==
The film explores many social issues like drug dealing, the search for respect and power, the roles of mothers and fathers in low-income or minority based communities, and violence. Kevin 'Jedi' Barrows is the lead actor who is a 20-year-old male that ultimately learns through tragedy.

== Cast ==
- K.C. Collins as Kevin "Jeddi" Barrows
- Mark Taylor as Mike "Twist" Twistleton
- Genelle Williams as Monica
- Clé Bennett as "Money"
- Kristin Fairlie as Kelly
- Yanna McIntosh as Pat Barrows
- Shakura S'Aida as Karen Twistleton
- Shawn Singleton as Ashcroft
- Zainab Musa as Constance Barrows
- Quincy Nanatakyi as Sean
- Suzanne Coy as Marva
- Mpho Koaho as Paul "Countryman" Blackhall
- Whitney Turner as Eric "Eric D"
- Jazzmeyn Barnett as Asia

== Critical reception ==
A very real and authentic representation of the struggle that individuals and groups in low-income or minority based communities go through to get by on a day-to-day basis. Using local and Canadian actors, many viewers found a connection that made this film more enjoyable to watch. As mentioned in most reviews, Doomstown is a great teaching film that can be used for educational purposes in both a school/classroom setting and/or in homes. The storyline or plot was not overdone, and really "hit home" to the people of Toronto or individuals that were familiar with the city and its local news that contained the problems presented.

== Awards ==
Doomstown won three Gemini Awards in 2007 according to IMDb and World News/Variety.com:

- 2007 Gemini Award for Best Direction in a Dramatic Program or Mini-Series: Doomstown, Sudz Sutherland
- 2007 Gemini Award for Best Performance by an Actress in a Featured Supporting Role in a Dramatic Program or Mini-Series: Won by Yanna McIntosh for her role as Pat Barrows
- 2007 Gemini Award for Best TV Movie: Pierre Sarrazin, Suzette Couture, Susan Murdoch
