= One of the Boys (disambiguation) =

One of the Boys is a 2008 album by Katy Perry, or its title track.

One of the Boys may also refer to:

== Music ==
- One of the Boys (Gretchen Wilson album) (2007) or its title track
- One of the Boys (Roger Daltrey album) (1977) or its title track
- "One of the Boys" (Mott the Hoople song) (1972)
- "One of the Boys", a song by Huey Lewis and the News from Weather
- "One of the Boys", a 1992 song by Julia Fordham from (Love Moves in) Mysterious Ways
- "One of the Boys", a song by John Lennon from the John Lennon Signature Box series
- "One of the Boys", a song by Mad Tsai

== Television ==
- One of the Boys (1982 TV series), an American sitcom
- One of the Boys (1989 TV series), an American sitcom
- One of the Boys (Philippine TV series) (2014)
- "One of the Boys", a 1990 episode of The Bill
- "One of the Boys", a 2004 episode of Blue Heelers
- "One of the Boys", a 1989 episode of Bordertown
- "One of the Boys", a 2001 episode of Drop the Beat
- "One of the Boys", a 1962 episode of Leave It to Beaver
- "One of the Boys", a 2016 episode of The Loud House
- "One of the Boys", a 2007 episode of My Family
- "One of the Boys", a 1973 episode of The New Dick Van Dyke Show
- "One of the Boys", a 1955 episode of The Stu Erwin Show
- "One of the Boys", a 1986 episode of Valerie (also known as The Hogan Family)
- "One of the Boys", a 1979 episode of The White Shadow

== Other ==
- One of the Boys (novel), a 2025 novel by Victoria Zeller

== See also ==
- Just One of the Guys, a 1985 film
- Old boy network, social and business connections among school graduates
- Old Boys, former pupils of primary and secondary schools
- One of the Guys (disambiguation)
