= Afrodizz =

Canadian afrobeat/afrofunk band

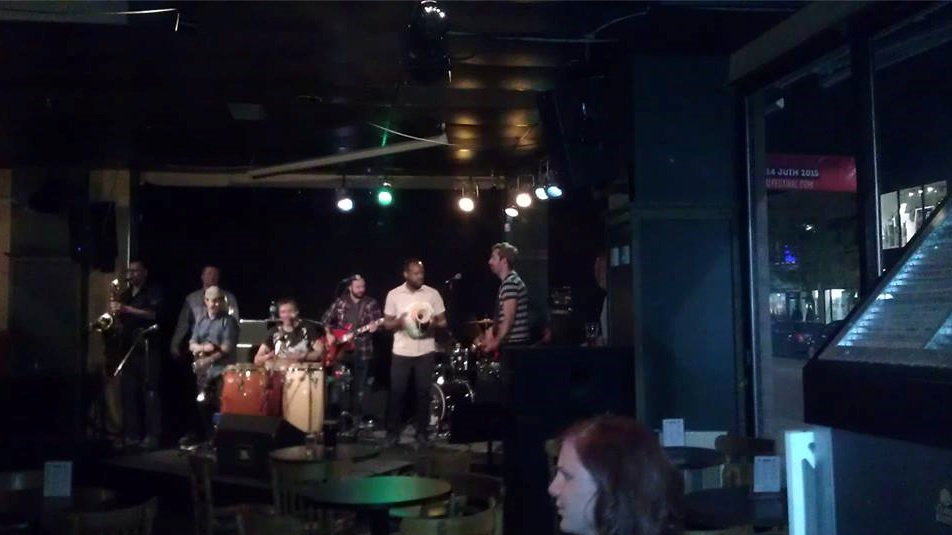
- Afrodizz photographed in Montreal, Quebec, Canada inside the now-defunct Les Bobards.

Background information
- Origin: Montreal, Quebec, Canada
- Genres: afrobeat, afrofunk, jazz-funk
- Instruments: baritone sax, bass guitar, drums, jazz guitar, trumpet, tenor sax
- Years active: 2002 – present
- Members: Gabriel Aldama; David Carbonneau; François Glidden; Jean-Philippe Goncalves; Vance Payne; François Plante; Frèdé Simard; François Vincent

Afrodizz is an eight-member afrobeat/afrofunk band from Montreal. Their music is a modern mix of afrobeat, jazz and funk, that has been described as having nuances of The Herbaliser and Tony Allen.

== History ==
The band was formed in 2002 by Montreal jazz guitarist, Gabriel Aldama—who also serves as the band's chief songwriter. Aldama was first introduced to afrobeat as a university student, when a friend played him some vinyl recordings by the genre's pioneer, Fela Kuti. Aldama has also credited the Beastie Boys' 1996 jazz-funk instrumental compilation The In Sound from Way Out! as an album that greatly influenced him.

The other members of Afrodizz include vocalist Vance Payne—who performs songs in English, Yorùbá and other languages of Nigeria—as well as François Plante (bass), Jean-Philippe Goncalves (drums), François Vincent (percussion), David Carbonneau (trumpet), Frèdé Simard (tenor sax), and François Glidden (baritone sax). Goncalves and Plante are also part of the electro-jazz trio, Plaster and Goncalves is also one half of the electronic music duo Beast.

== Albums and awards ==
The band played the Montreal International Jazz Festival in 2003 and was named "Revelation of the Year" in the Tropiques series. Andy Williams, an English-born Montreal DJ and jazz specialist, brought the EP to the attention of Adrian Gibson, the programmer for the London's Jazz Café who had just founded the UK label Freestyle Records. Gibson signed the band to record their first album. After the release of their first album, Kif Kif, in 2004, Afrodizz toured Europe. At the height of their popularity, they were able to sell out shows at Gibson's prestigious Jazz Café.

In 2006 the band released their second album Froots on Montreal's C4 label. Montreal rock artist Deweare appeared as a guest vocalist on the song "Fashion Terroriste" in a Gainsbourg-esque performance. The album went on the win Best Worldbeat/Traditional Album at the 2006 GAMIQ Awards (Quebec Independent Music Awards), and won Best Artist in the Cosmopolitan category of the Montreal International Music Initiative Awards (MIMIs), an honour which is given to the best "roots, intercultural and new musical language" artist.

Afrodizz performed the song "Africa Music" on the tribute album Les machines à danser (dancing machines) released in June 2010; the album is a compilation of songs originally performed by French West Indies/French Guianese pop band La Compagnie Créole and includes covers by artists such as Ariane Moffatt and Dubmatique.

At the 2011 Montreal International Jazz Festival, Afrodizz launched its third album, "Sounds from Outer Space". It last played the festival in 2016, but, as of 2021, continues to perform at the Festival International Nuits d'Afrique de Montreal.
