= List of MapleMusic artists =

This is a list of artists who are, or have been, signed to MapleMusic Recordings. Many of the acts no longer with the label are still distributed by Fontana North, a sister company and/or sold on MapleMusic.com.

== # ==
- 22-20s
- 311

== A ==
- Alabama Shakes
- Alberta Cross
- Trey Anastasio
- Ashes of Soma
- Autolux

== B ==
- Jason Bajada
- Danny Barnes
- Rayland Baxter
- Beady Eye
- The Bees
- Belly
- Brendan Benson
- Ridley Bent
- Billy Talent
- Boots Electric
- Bo Keeney
- BOY
- Braided
- The Bright Light Social Hour
- Brighter Brightest
- The Bronx
- Jim Bryson & The Weakerthans
- John Butler Trio

== C ==
- Candy Coated Killahz
- Carl Broemel
- DJ Champion
- Chantal Kreviazuk
- Codeine Velvet Club
- Cookie Duster
- Cowboy Junkies
- Crowded House

== D ==
- Dala
- Dawes
- The Dears
- Delphic
- Mike Doughty
- Gordon Downie
- Drive-By Truckers

== E ==
- Eastern Conference Champions
- Kathleen Edwards
- Peter Elkas
- Everest

== F ==
- Fiction Family
- The Fireman
- Fitz and the Tantrums
- Mike Ford

== G ==
- Gomez
- Grady
- David Gray

== H ==
- Lisa Hannigan
- Hatcham Social
- The Henry Clay People
- Patterson Hood

== J ==
- Colin James
- Jim James
- Carly Rae Jepsen
- Jem
- Sass Jordan
- Jovanotti

== K ==
- Kill the Lights
- Patrick Krief
- Ben Kweller

== L ==
- Land of Talk
- Daniel Lanois
- The Latency
- Bobby Long
- The Lowest of the Low
- Lucero

== M ==
- Major Lazer
- Mariachi El Bronx
- Massari
- Danny Michel
- Miike Snow
- The Miniatures
- Minus the Bear
- Misstress Barbara
- My Morning Jacket

== N ==
- Nash
- Sierra Noble
- Not by Choice
- Neverending White Lights

== O ==
- Old Crow Medicine Show
- Organ Thieves
- Other Lives
- Ben Ottewell

== P ==
- Doug Paisley
- Lesley Pike
- Pilot Speed (formerly Pilate)
- Joel Plaskett Emergency
- Jason Plumb
- Port O'Brien
- Prozzak
- Primus

== R ==
- Radiohead
- The Rankin Family
- Sam Roberts
- Rodrigo y Gabriela
- Caitlin Rose
- Royal Wood
- Rusko

== S ==
- Gordie Sampson
- Sea Wolf
- Silversun Pickups
- SOJA
- Theresa Sokyrka
- Spirit of the West
- Kinnie Starr
- Allen Stone

== T ==
- Tegan and Sara
- Texas King
- Two Gallants

== U ==
- David Usher

== W ==
- Martha Wainwright
- The Whigs
- White Rabbits
- Widespread Panic
- Simon Wilcox

== See also ==
- MapleMusic Recordings
