= The Remix Album (Champion album) =

Remix album by Champion
- Released: 2006
- Genre: Dance music
- Label: Saboteur Records

Champion chronology
Chill'em All (2004)	The Remix Album (2006)	Live (2007)

The Remix Album is an album by Champion, released in 2006 on Saboteur Records. The album collects remixes by various Canadian musicians of tracks from Champion's 2004 debut album Chill'em All.

The album was nominated for Dance Recording of the Year at the 2007 Juno Awards, but lost to Tiga's album Sexor.

== Track listing ==
No.	Title	Length
1.	"Guy Doune (Patrick Watson's Missing You Remake)"	4:37
2.	"Two Hoboes (Mocky Remix)"	4:58
3.	"No Heaven (Ghislain Poirier Remix)"	3:45
4.	"No Hoboes (Detroit Grand Pubahs Gutter Mind Mix)"	6:13
5.	"Keep On (Champion's Alternate Take)"	3:31
6.	"Tawoumga (Guillaume & the Coutu Dumonts Remix)"	6:14
7.	"Chill'em All (Champion's Melange)"	5:17
8.	"Tawoumga (Fred Everything's Petit Dub)"	5:46
9.	"No 7/11's (Akufen's Chill'em All Mix)"	7:33
