= Deweare =

French musician

- Born: Franck Deweare; France
- Origin: Verdun, Brussels, Montreal
- Genres: Alternative rock; electronic rock; post-punk; trip hop; electronica; downtempo
- Occupations: Singer-songwriter; guitarist
- Instruments: Guitars; electronic instrumentation/programming; vocals
- Website: MySpace page

Franck Deweare (pronounced "de-vair"), also known by his stage name Deweare, and previously as Franck Marx, is a musician native to Verdun, France, who has been based out of Montreal, Quebec since 2004. Deweare's style, both lyrically and vocally, has been compared to that of Serge Gainsbourg, due to his rough yet seductive voice and dark lyrics.

== Early career ==
Deweare's music was greatly influenced by the resurgence of French punk cult bands such as Bérurier Noir and Ludwig von 88, as well as by rock musician, comedian and poet Alain Bashung and by American music artist Beck—another musician to whom Deweare's vocals have been compared. Deweare stated in a 2006 interview: "It's [Beck] that inspired me to sing, to produce something aesthetic."

Prior to coming to Canada, Deweare moved to Brussels and recorded some material under the name Franck Marx, on the same label as Belgian rock band dEUS. His work under the Marx moniker leaned towards a more aggressive rock/grunge sound.

== Move to Montreal ==
Deweare has stated in more than one interview that his reason for leaving France was due to the political climate and the increasing racial tensions within the country. He stated that he chose Canada because he thought of the country as "an example of integration working."

By chance, Deweare struck-up a conversation with Québécoise musician Ariane Moffatt in 2004 during a flight delay at Charles de Gaulle Airport on his way to Canada for the very first time. After listening to some of his demos, Moffat connected Deweare with some local, Montreal talent—including the members of electro-jazz band Plaster, who wound up backing him on his debut album, High Class Trauma. Since coming to Canada, Deweare has collaborated with many North American artists: He performed live with Moffat and wrote the song "Tes invectives" on her 2008 album Tous les sens, he provided vocals for Afrodizz on their song "Fashion Terrorist" from their album Froots, and he has also worked with Cyndi Lauper and The Herbaliser.

== High Class Trauma ==
High Class Trauma was released in 2006 on the Milagro Records label, and was the first album that the artist had released under the moniker "Deweare". The album is a mixture of grunge-like guitar and electronica and is at times atmospheric, much like a movie soundtrack; the songs are all performed in English and some contain hints of trip-hop and jazz.

On the album, Deweare collaborated with many Québécois artists; Deweare received assistance from Éloi Painchaud from the band Okoumé, as well as Plaster bandmembers Jean-Phi Goncalves and Alex MacMahon. The first single off the album "The New Dawn" features fellow Montreal vocalist Béatrice Bonifassi—the song is a cover of Nina Simone's rendition of Feeling Good which appeared on her 1965 album I Put a Spell on You. The album was also mixed by Carl Bastien, who has worked with many Québécois artists such as Daniel Bélanger, Dumas and Jean-Pierre Ferland.

== Other projects ==
Deweare is currently working on a new album which will feature songs sung in French. The album's release has been planned for the fall of 2008 and the single Laisse aller can be heard on Deweare's MySpace page.

In early 2009, Deweare collaborated with Ariane Moffatt and co-wrote "L'homme de la situation" on Amandine Bourgeois's first album (released June 1).
