= Clé Bennett =

Canadian actor (born 1981)

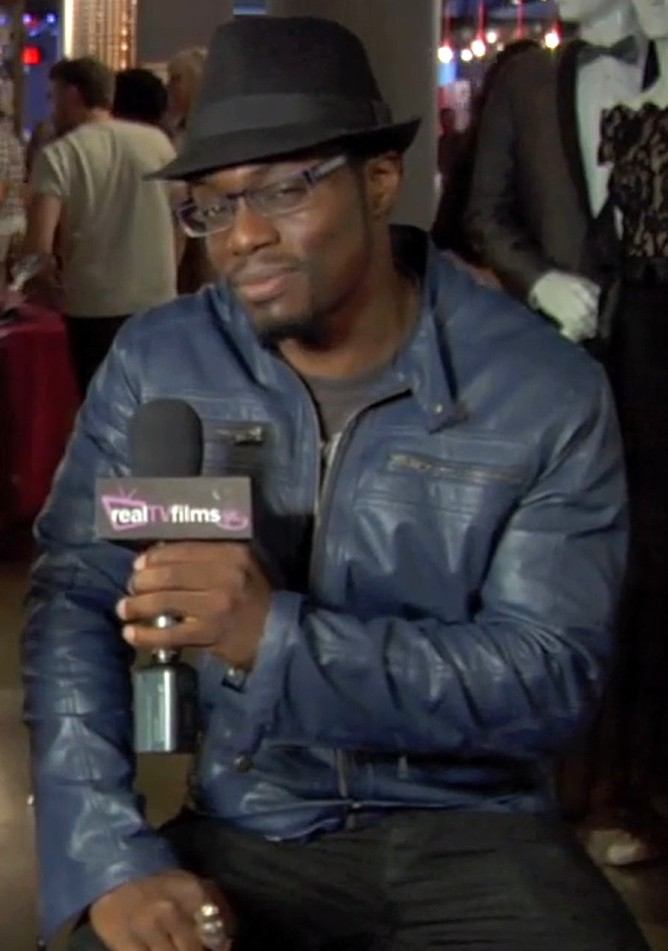
- Clé Bennett at the 2013 Toronto International Film Festival
- Born: July 13, 1981 (age 44); Toronto, Ontario, Canada
- Occupation: Actor
- Years active: 1994–present

Clé Bennett (born July 13, 1981) is a Canadian actor. He voiced DJ, Beardo, Leonard, and Chef Hatchet from Total Drama, and has portrayed Lemar Hoskins in the Marvel Cinematic Universe miniseries The Falcon and the Winter Soldier.

== Early life ==
Bennett was born in Toronto and raised in Ajax, Ontario. He is of Jamaican descent.

== Career ==
Bennett is known for his portrayal of villain Harris Prime, on NBC's Heroes Reborn. He is a two-time Gemini Award winner, having received honors for Best Supporting Actor in a Drama Series for The Line and Best Supporting Actor in a Miniseries for Guns. He portrayed Lemar Hoskins / Battlestar in The Falcon and the Winter Soldier series on Disney+.

== Filmography ==
=== Film ===
Year	Title	Role	Notes
1998	Shudder	Blaine	Short film
1998	Urban Legend	Techie Guy	
2000	Bait	Convict	
2001	Harvard Man	Hal	
2001	Treed Murray	"Shark"	
2002	Steal	Otis	Also known as Riders
2007	How She Move	Garvey	
2008	Animal 2	"Twist"	
2010	Barney's Version	Cedric	
2011	Stag	Gus - First AD	
2012	Liberty City - The American Dream	Dee	
2015	Borealis	"Brick"	
2015	Zoom	Carl	
2017	Jigsaw	Detective Keith Hunt	
2019	Lucky Day	Le Roi	
2023	Organ Trail	Erik	
2024	1992	Copeland	

=== Television ===
Year	Title	Role	Notes
1998	Mr. Music	Larry McGuire	Television film
1998	Naked City: A Killer Christmas	Second Man	Television film
1999	Nightworld: Survivor	Malcolm Jones	Television film
1999	The Hoop Life	Damon Brown	
1999	Twice in a Lifetime	Charlie Winters Jr.	Episode: "The Blame Game"
2000	La Femme Nikita	Trent Hammett	Episode: "Time to Be Heroes"
2000	The Famous Jett Jackson	Dylan Cain	Episode: "Hello, Goodbye"
2000	Who Killed Atlanta's Children?	Wayne Williams	Television film
2000	Hendrix	Billy Cox	Television film
2000	Code Name: Eternity	Tommy	Episodes: "Never Go Home" and "Laura's Story"
2000	Livin' for Love: The Natalie Cole Story	Abdullah	Television film
2001–2002	Soul Food	Chris	Episodes: "Come Back for the Comeback" and "In Transition"
2002–2003	Odyssey 5	Dr. Leshawn	4 episodes
2003	Street Time	Doug Moses	Episode: "Even"
2006	This Is Wonderland	Unknown	Episode: "3.7"
2006	Doomstown	"Money"	Television film
2007	The Best Years	Billy Marshall	Episodes: "Five Easy Pieces" and "Mommie Dearest"
2007–2014	Total Drama	Chef Hatchet / DJ / DJ's Mother / Beardo / Leonard	Seasons 1-5
2008	Da Kink in My Hair	Kyro	Episode: "Speaky Spokey"
2008	Instant Star	Thurman	9 episodes
2008–2009	The Line	Carlos	15 episodes
2008–2011	Razzberry Jazzberry Jam	Louis the Trumpet	26 episodes
2009	Soul	Russell Alexander	3 episodes
2009	Guns	Conrad	Television miniseries
2009	Cra$h & Burn	Marcus	Episode: "Freedom"
2009–2010	The Dating Guy	Black Employee / Jive Talking Pigeon	Episodes: "Really Bad Lieutenant" and "24ish"
2009, 2011	Flashpoint	Shane Thomas / Rafik "Raf" Rousseau	Episode "Exit Wounds"; Main cast: 13 episodes
2010	The Night Before the Night Before Christmas	Lonnie	Television film
2010	Lost Girl	The Ash	5 episodes
2010–2011	Shattered	Detective John Holland	13 episodes
2011	Republic of Doyle	Stan Bittman	Episode: "A Stand Up Guy"
2011	The Listener	Peter Charlebois	Episode: "Crime Seen"
2011	My Babysitter's a Vampire	Coach Ed	Episode: "Friday Night Frights"
2011	Breakout Kings	Stucky	Episode: "There Are Rules"
2011-2013	Skatoony	"T-Bone" / Chef Hatchet	Episodes: "Superheroes" and "Cafe Le Quiz"
2012	BeyWheelz	Gigante	
2013	Rookie Blue	Wesley Cole	Episode: "You Can See the Stars"
2013	Cracked	Billy Rosseau	Episode: "Rocket Man"
2013	Arrow	Xavier Reed / The Mayor	Episode: "Crucible"
2013	Mother Up!	"2Bit"	
2014	Beauty & The Beast	Xavier Wright	2 episodes
2014	Murdoch Mysteries	Ozzy Hughes	Episode: "Murdoch in Ragtime"
2014–2016	Sensitive Skin	Theodore	
2014	Aaliyah: The Princess of R&B	R. Kelly	Television film
2015	Total Drama Presents: The Ridonculous Race	Leonard	2 episodes
2015	Heroes Reborn	M.F. Harris	Recurring role
2016	Private Eyes	Detective Derek Nolan	Recurring role
2017	The Expanse	Lieutenant Commissioner Thorsen	1 episode
2017–2018	Cloudy with a Chance of Meatballs	Earl Devereaux	Main role
2018	Homeland	Doxie	5 episodes
2019	The Tick	Sage	4 episodes
2019	The Man in the High Castle	Elijah	10 episodes
2021	The Falcon and the Winter Soldier	Lemar Hoskins / Battlestar	Recurring Role, 3 episodes
2021	Marvel Studios: Assembled	Himself	Documentary; Episode: "Assembled: The Making of The Falcon and the Winter Soldier"

=== Video games ===
Year	Title	Role	Notes
2011	Deus Ex: Human Revolution	Additional Characters	Voice role

== Awards ==
- Gemini Awards 2010: Best Performance by an Actor in a Featured Supporting Role in a Dramatic Program or Mini-Series for: Guns (TV mini-series) (2008).
- Gemini Awards 2010: Best Performance by an Actor in a Featured Supporting Role in a Dramatic Series for: The Line (2008, Episodes 203 and 206) (series).
