= Yanna McIntosh =

Jamaican-Canadian actress

- Born: 1970 (age 55–56); Jamaica
- Other name: Yanna MacIntosh
- Education: University of Toronto; American Repertory Theatre Institute

Yanna McIntosh (born 1970), sometimes credited as Yanna MacIntosh, is a Jamaican-born Canadian television, movie and theatrical actress.

== Early life ==
McIntosh attended the University of Toronto and the Institute for Advanced Theater Training at Harvard University, in which she trained for acting in theatrical productions. She taught students of theatre at the National Theatre School of Canada and Humber College.

== Career ==
Yanna McIntosh's theatre credits include Petruchio in The Taming of the Shrew, Hedda in Hedda Gabler, Mary in Friedrich Schiller's Mary Stuart, and Condoleezza Rice in David Hare's Stuff Happens.

McIntosh's most notable recurring roles in television series include Dr. Currie in the short-lived 90's medical drama Side Effects, Jenni Hernandez in Riverdale, Edna Myles in The Eleventh Hour, Dr. Rollins in Blue Murder, Zona Robinson in This is Wonderland, and Ms. Dymond in the Canadian teen drama The Best Years. She has starred in a number of made-for-television movies, such as Atomic Train (1999), in which she played Christina Roselli, Strange Justice (1999), in which she played Jeanette, Deliberate Intent (2000), in which she played Elaine, Crown Heights (2004), Chasing Freedom (2004), in which she played Ruth, Reversible Errors (2004), in which she played Genevieve Carriere, Doomstown (2006), in which she played Pat Barrows, Why I Wore Lipstick to My Mastectomy (2006), in which she played Dr. Crone, They Come Back (2007), in which she played Naketha, and Matters of Life and Dating (2007). She voices Jenny the giraffe in another Canadian animated TV show called Willa's Wild Life.

Some of her appearances in movies and direct-to-video films include Nicole in Spooky House (2000), Penny Mills in Full Disclosure (2001), Teddy Vargas in The Sentinel (2006), and Diana in Finn's Girl (2007). Other roles include Down in the Delta (1998), John Q (2002), and Heaven on Earth (2008).

In 2011 McIntosh played the starring role of Mama Nadi in Lynn Nottage's Pulitzer Prize-winning play Ruined, produced by Obsidian Theatre and Nightwood Theatre.

In 2014, she played Cleopatra in a Stratford Festival production of William Shakespeare's Antony and Cleopatra. The production was also filmed for the CBC Television series CBC Presents the Stratford Festival as Antony and Cleopatra; McIntosh garnered a Canadian Screen Award nomination as best actress in a television film or miniseries at the 4th Canadian Screen Awards for the role.

In 2019, McIntosh joined the San Francisco production of Harry Potter and the Cursed Child as Hermione Granger.

== Reception ==
In his 2007 article on McIntosh's role as Mary Stuart in the Friedrich Schiller play of the same name, chief theatre critic Richard Ouzounian of the Toronto Star described McIntosh as capable of good performances on difficult stage roles, titling his article "No role too bold for Mary Stuart star". In his later review of the play, Ouzounian, who rated the play with two stars out of four, stated that McIntosh's role as Stuart and Nancy Palk's role as Elizabeth I of England were among the few highlights he saw in the play.

Her performance as Pat Barrows in the 2006 made-for-TV movie Doomstown won Yanna McIntosh the 2007 Gemini award for Best Performance by an Actress in a Featured Supporting Role in a Dramatic Program or Mini-Series. For her theatrical acting, she has received six Dora Mavor Moore Award nominations in the Best Actress category. She won the award twice; once for Florence Gibson's Belle and again for Athol Fugard's Valley Song.

In 2011, McIntosh became the first ever person to win the Toronto Theatre Critics' Award for Best Actress in a Play for her performance in Ruined. For this role, she also won the 2011 Dora Mavor Moore Award for Outstanding Performance by a Female in a Principal Role.

== Filmography ==
=== Film ===
Year	Title	Role	Notes
2017	Mary Goes Round	Bethany	
2021	Om	Zoom Call Attendee	
2022	Om Reunion	Prince Edwin	
2022	Nehra! We Are India	Bestie	
2022	Slumberland	Carla	
2023	Anvaya's Adventure	Himself	

=== Television ===
Year	Title	Role	Notes
1982, 1983	Hangin' In	Tanya / Joan	2 episodes
1993	Street Legal	Dr. Helen Ruth	Episode: "Strange Bedfellows"
1993	Romeo & Juliet	Citizen of Verona	Television film
1994	The Babymaker: The Dr. Cecil Jacobson Story	Lab Technician	Television film
1995–1996	Side Effects	Dr. Currie	4 episodes
1997	Due South	Candace Madison	Episode: "Seeing Is Believing"
1999	Night Man	Ally Cooper	Episode: "Love and Death"
1999	Poltergeist: The Legacy	Madame Claire	Episode: "The Possession"
1999	Atomic Train	Christina Roselli	2 episodes
1999	A Murder on Shadow Mountain	Def. Atty. Daws	Television film
1999	Strange Justice	Elaine	Television film
2000	Deliberate Intent	Elaine	Television film
2002	The Glow	Catherine	Television film
2002	The Rats	Doctor	Television film
2003, 2004	Train 48	Simone	2 episodes
2003–2004	Blue Murder	Dr. Rollins	5 episodes
2004	Chasing Freedom	Ruth	Television film
2004	Crown Heights	Mrs Moses	Television film
2004	Reversible Errors	Genevieve Carriere	Television film
2004–2006	This Is Wonderland	Zona Robinson	34 episodes
2006	Doomstown	Pat Barrows	Television film
2006	Why I Wore Lipstick to My Mastectomy	Dr. Crone	Television film
2007	They Come Back	Naketha	Television film
2007–2009	The Best Years	Ms. Dymond	6 episodes
2008	A Raisin in the Sun	Miss Tilly	Television film
2009	The Line	Karen	15 episodes
2011	XIII: The Series	Detective Pullan	Episode: "Training Camp"
2012	The Listener	Rita Bello	Episode: "The Taking"
2013	Republic of Doyle	Sarah	2 episodes
2013	Saving Hope	Prisoner Escort	Episode: "The Face of the Giant Panda"
2013	Suits	Judge Pearl Atkins	3 episodes
2014	Working the Engels	Mavis	Episode: "The Crazy Family"
2014	Hemlock Grove	Frieda	2 episodes
2015	Remedy	Leona	2 episodes
2017	Private Eyes	Dr. Thomas	Episode: "Between a Doc and a Hard Place"
2017	Killjoys	Zia Seyah Traclus	Episode: "Necropolis Now"
2018	In Contempt	Earliene Walker	Episode: "Combat by Agreement"
2018	The Expanse	Captain Chandra Lucas	2 episodes
2018	Anne with an E	Hazel	2 episodes
2019	Ransom	Francine Weaver	Episode: "Truth & Reconciliation"
2020	Spinning Out	Camille	Episode: "Healing Times May Vary"
2020	Nurses	Mrs. Richie	Episode: "Incoming"
2021	Coroner	Olivia Rice	Episode: "Blue Flock"
2021	The Republic of Sarah	Edna	2 episodes
2021	Y: The Last Man	General Peggy Reed	6 episodes
2022	Good Sam	Dr. Rhonda Glass	7 episodes
2022	Swindler Seduction	Francie	Television film
2023	Work It Out Wombats!	Grandma Super (voice)	Main character
2023	Titans	Roberta	Episode: "Caul's Folly"
2024	Lyla in the Loop	Miss Emmaline, Auntie Rita	
2024	Beyond Black Beauty	Doris	
2025	Hell Motel	Shirley Dantree	Main role
