= Slāv =

SLĀV is a Canadian theatre production. It was created by Béatrice Bonifassi, with Robert Lepage as stage director. The pair launched the show on June 26, 2018, during the Montreal International Jazz Festival.

SLĀV, billed as "a theatrical odyssey based on slave songs", was met with growing controversy, with protesters accusing it of cultural appropriation and cultural insensitivity. Musician Moses Sumney cancelled his performance at the festival in protest, saying:

there is no context in which white people performing black slave songs is okay. Especially not while they are dressed like poor field workers or cotton pickers. Especially not while they are directed by a white director and in a theater charging loads of money ... This kind of black imitation is very reminiscent of blackface minstrel shows. The only thing missing is black paint.

The Jazz Festival administrators, in the face of public pressure and the threat of other artists withdrawing, cancelled the remaining performances, all of which had sold out. "Since the beginning of SLĀV performances, the festival team has been shaken and strongly affected by all the comments received," L'Équipe Spectra, which produces the festival, said in a statement to the Montreal Gazette. "We would like to apologize to those who were hurt. It was not our intention at all." They gave Bonifassi's decision and the Festival's concerns for public safety as their reasons for cancellation.

The creation of the show was the subject of a BBC Radio 4 documentary, "Behind the Scenes". In it, Bonifassi spoke about avoiding cultural appropriation and creating "resilience by vocal art". The radio programme aired on July 4, 2018.

== See also ==
- Slave Songs of the United States, a written collection of African-American songs, published just after the American Civil War
