= The Lost Fingers =

Canadian gypsy jazz band

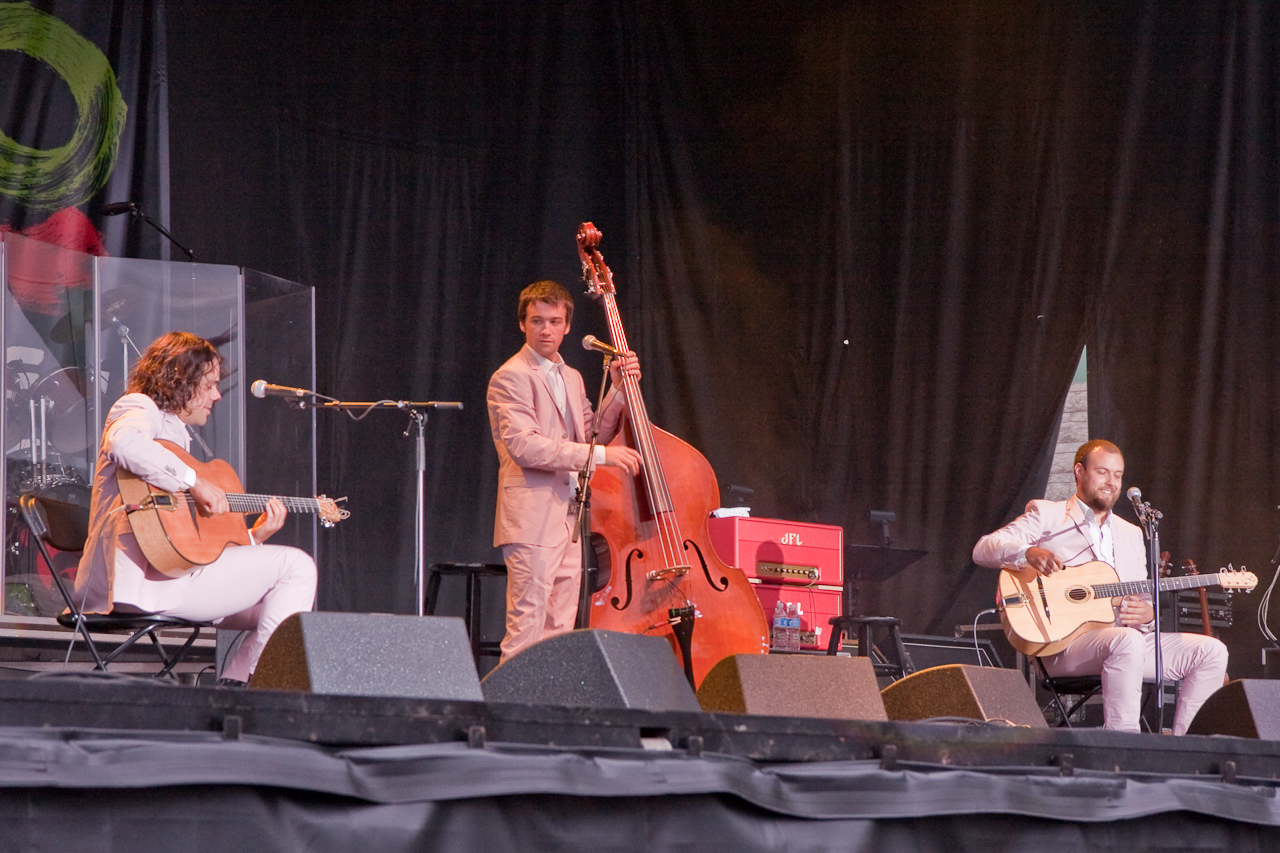
- The Lost Fingers performing in 2009

Background information
- Origin: Quebec City, Quebec, Canada
- Genres: Gypsy jazz
- Years active: 2008–present
- Labels: Tandem, L-A be
- Members: Alex Morissette; Rosalie Roberge; Byron Mikaloff; François Rioux
- Past members: Christian Roberge; Valérie Amyot
- Website: thelostfingers.com

The Lost Fingers are a Canadian gypsy jazz music group from Quebec City.

== History ==
The group was formed in 2006 by Alex Morissette (backing vocals, double bass), Byron "Maiden" Mikaloff (vocals, guitar) and Christian Roberge (vocals, guitar). In 2014, after the departure of Roberge, two new members joined the group: François Rioux (guitar) and Valérie Amyot (vocals). The band's name was inspired by the genre's founder, gypsy jazz guitarist Django Reinhardt, who lost the use of two fingers in a fire.

Lost in the 80s, their 2008 debut album, earned a platinum certification for sales of 100,000 in Quebec within 12 weeks of its release. It included covers popular songs from the 80's including Samantha Fox's "Touch Me" and Bon Jovi's "You Give Love a Bad Name". Canadian distribution outside Quebec began on 27 January 2009, after which the album's sales reached 200,000. Lost in the 80's has been released in the U.S., Belgium, France, Mexico, Switzerland, and Spain. In terms of 2008 domestic sales by Canadian artists, this album was second only to Nickelback's Dark Horse. Their second album Rendez-vous Rose was released on 16 June 2009 and includes versions of successful French-language songs. Rendez-vous Rose reached gold album status in 2009 after selling over 45,000 albums.

In 2009, the band was nominated for two Juno Awards in the categories of Fan Choice Award and Album of the Year.

In 2019, Valérie Amyot left the group to focus on her health and pursue solo projects. The role of vocalist was taken over by Rosalie Roberge, a graduate from Cégep de Saint-Laurent in Professional Music and Song Techniques.

== Discography ==
- Lost in the 80s (2008)
- Rendez-vous rose (2009)
- Gypsy Kameleon (2010)
- La Marquise (2011)
- Wonders of the World (2014)
- Christmas Caravan (2016)
- Coconut Christmas (2017)
- Worldwide Christmas (2018)
- VS. (2020)
