= One of the Boys (novel) =

2025 novel by Victoria Zeller

- Author: Victoria Zeller
- Language: English
- Publisher: Levine Querido
- Publication date: May 13, 2025
- Pages: 344
- ISBN: 978-1-64614-502-7

One of the Boys is a 2025 young adult novel by American author Victoria Zeller.

Set near Buffalo, New York, the novel follows Grace Woodhouse, a transgender teenager who played as a kicker for her school's football team. After coming out before her senior year, she must learn how to manage her old and new lives.

== Reception ==
One of the Boys was well received by critics, including starred reviews from Booklist, BookPage, and Publishers Weekly. Publishers Weekly named it one of the best young adult novels of 2025, and it received the 2026 Stonewall Book Award for Young Adult Literature.

Booklist's Kelly Ferreira called the novel "a standout first work", while Kirkus Reviews referred to it as "honest, gentle, and hopeful". Ferreira highlighted how "Grace’s journey through senior year is portrayed with nuance, noting the struggles of transition when one doesn’t “pass” and of old friends learning to accept a 'new' version of herself". Jessica Pang, writing for BookPage, said the novel is "as inspiring and illuminating as it is funny and relatable".
