= The Triplets of Belleville =

2003 animated film by Sylvain Chomet

- French theatrical release poster
- French: Les Triplettes de Belleville
- Directed by: Sylvain Chomet
- Written by: Sylvain Chomet
- Produced by: Viviane Vanfleteren; Regis Ghezelbash; Colin Rose
- Starring: Béatrice Bonifassi; Lina Boudreau; Michel Robin
- Edited by: Dominique Brune; Chantal Colibert Brunner; Dominique Lefever
- Music by: Ben Charest
- Production companies: Les Armateurs; Champion; Vivi Film; France 3 Cinéma; RGP France; BBC Bristol; BBC Worldwide
- Distributed by: Diaphana Films (France); Cinéart (Belgium); Alliance Atlantis (Canada); Tartan Films (United Kingdom)
- Release dates: 18 May 2003 (Cannes); 11 June 2003 (France); 25 June 2003 (Belgium); 29 August 2003 (United Kingdom); November 26, 2003 (United States)
- Running time: 78 minutes
- Countries: France; Belgium; Canada; United Kingdom
- Languages: French; English; Portuguese
- Budget: $9.5 million
- Box office: $14.8 million

The Triplets of Belleville (French: Les Triplettes de Belleville) is a 2003 animated comedy-drama film written and directed by Sylvain Chomet. It was released as Belleville Rendez-vous in the United Kingdom and Ireland. The film is Chomet's first feature film and was an international co-production among companies in France, Belgium, Canada and the United Kingdom.

The film features the voices of Lina Boudreault, Mari-Lou Gauthier, Michèle Caucheteux, Jean-Claude Donda, Michel Robin, and Monica Viegas. There is little dialogue; much of the narrative is conveyed through song and pantomime. It tells the story of Madame Souza, an elderly woman who goes on a quest to rescue her grandson Champion, a Tour de France cyclist, who has been kidnapped by the French mafia for gambling purposes and taken to the city of Belleville (an amalgamation of New York City, Montreal and Quebec City). She is accompanied by Champion's loyal and fat hound, Bruno, and joined by the Triplets of Belleville, music hall singers from the 1930s, whom she meets in the city.

The film was highly praised by audiences and critics for its unique style of animation and has since gained a cult following. The film was nominated for two Academy Awards—Best Animated Feature and Best Original Song for "Belleville Rendez-vous". It was also screened out of competition (hors concours) at the 2003 Cannes Film Festival.

== Plot ==
In France, Madame Souza is raising her grandson Champion, a melancholy orphan. They watch an old variety show on television featuring a trio of singers, the Triplets of Belleville (Rose, Blanche, and Violette). When the program is interrupted, Souza asks Champion if the "film" is finished. The listless Champion does not reply and instead changes the channel to a piano concert. Souza, seeing Champion's interest in the music, pulls out an old piano and tries to amuse him, but Champion remains indifferent. She deduces that Champion is lonely and buys him a dog, Bruno. Neither Bruno nor an electric train set succeed in lifting Champion's spirits, and the dog has no interests apart from eating, sleeping, and barking at trains.

While tidying Champion's room, Souza discovers a book filled with photos of cyclists. She buys Champion a tricycle, and he becomes an obsessive cyclist. Some years later he is competing in the Tour de France, when he is kidnapped by a pair of mobsters in a Citroën van. They take him and two other contestants across the Atlantic, Souza pursuing them on a pedalo.

Arriving in the United States penniless and hungry, Souza and Bruno end up sitting in an alley. With nothing to do, Souza picks up an old bicycle wheel and starts hitting the spokes, making a melody. That attracts the Triplets, and they begin singing to the sound of the bicycle wheel. They take Souza to their seedy apartment. When dinner is finally served, it consists of frog soup and frog stew, with tadpoles for dessert, collected by Violette using "expanding bait". Later, Souza joins their band, for which she plays the bicycle wheel as a hammered dulcimer while the Triplets play a wire refrigerator shelf as a harp, a vacuum cleaner as a bagpipe, and newspaper percussion. During the show, Souza spots the kidnappers. With the help of the Triplets, Souza rescues the cyclists, who had been forced to pedal-power a gambling machine; they all escape on the pedaling frame, pursued by the mobsters in Citroën sedans.

In a flashforward, an older Champion watches the TV again showing their adventure when they are leaving the city and remembers Souza asking once more if the film is finished. Champion turns to the empty bench next to him and says "It's over, Grandma".

In a humorous post-credits scene, the boatman who rented Souza the pedalo is seen patiently waiting for his vessel to return.

== Cast ==
- Lina Boudreau as Rose Triplette (voice)
- Mari-Lou Gauthier as Violette Triplette (voice)
- Michèle Caucheteux as Blanche Triplette (voice)
- Béatrice Bonifassi as the Triplets (singing voice)
- Jean-Claude Donda as Le Général de Gaulle / Les commentateurs sportifs / Le clochard / Les réclames (voice)
- Monica Viegas as Madame Souza (voice)
- Graziella de Villa as Madame Souza (English version) (voice)
- Michel Robin as 'Champion' adulte (voice)
- Noël Baye as 'Champion' adulte (English version) (voice)
- Dirk Denoyelle as Les commentateurs sportifs / Le clochard (Dutch version) (voice)

== Reception ==
Rotten Tomatoes, a review aggregator, reports that 94% of 148 surveyed critics gave it a positive review, and the average rating was 8.2/10; the consensus reads: "Richly detailed and loaded with surreal touches, The Triplets of Belleville is an odd, delightful charmer." Metacritic, which assigns a normalized score, rated it 91/100 based on 35 reviews, indicating "universal acclaim". It is one of the 15 highest-rated animated films of all time on the platform.

Kenneth Turan, writing for Los Angeles Times give a perfect rating and said "Fast, funny, unexpected and uninhibited, The Triplets of Belleville may be animated, but it is also the product of an artistic vision every bit as rigorous as any lofty Cannes prize-winner. Hearing about a film this special isn't enough. It demands to be seen, and it generously rewards those who, like Madame Souza, let nothing stand in their way".

Joe Morgenstern, film critic of The Wall Street Journal, loved the movie and said "A single seeing isn't enough to take in the eccentric marvels of The Triplets of Belleville, an animated feature by Sylvain Chomet that creates a visual language all its own."

Claudia Puig from USA Today gave the film four stars out of four, and write "Both a nostalgic throwback to the silent-picture era and an ultra-modern animated tale, the slyly humorous Triplets of Belleville is artful, engrossing and oddly touching".

A.O. Scott from The New York Times gave the film five stars out of five, said "May be the oddest movie of the year, by turns sweet and sinister, insouciant and grotesque, invitingly funny and forbiddingly dark. It may also be one of the best, a tour de force of ink-washed, crosshatched mischief and unlikely sublimity".

=== Awards and nominations ===
The film was nominated for two Academy Awards: for Best Animated Feature, making it the first PG-13 animated film to be nominated in that category; and for Best Original Song (Benoît Charest and Sylvain Chomet for the song "Belleville Rendez-vous", sung by Matthieu Chedid in the original version). The film lost the Best Animated Feature award to Finding Nemo and the Best Original Song to Into the West from The Lord of the Rings: The Return of the King. It also won the César for Best Film Music, and as a co-production with Canada it won the Genie Award for Best Motion Picture and the BBC Four World Cinema Award in 2004.

Award	Date of ceremony	Category	Recipients	Result
Academy Awards	29 February 2004	Best Animated Feature	Sylvain Chomet	Nominated
Academy Awards	29 February 2004	Best Original Song	Benoît Charest (music) & Sylvain Chomet (lyrics) (for Belleville Rendez-vous)	Nominated
Annie Awards	7 February 2004	Best Animated Feature	The Triplets of Belleville	Nominated
Annie Awards	7 February 2004	Outstanding Achievement for Directing in a Feature Production	Sylvain Chomet	Nominated
Annie Awards	7 February 2004	Outstanding Achievement for Writing in a Feature Production	Sylvain Chomet	Nominated
César Awards	21 February 2004	Best Film	The Triplets of Belleville	Nominated
César Awards	21 February 2004	Best First Film	The Triplets of Belleville	Nominated
César Awards	21 February 2004	Best Original Music	Benoît Charest	Won
Critics Choice Awards	10 January 2004	Best Animated Feature	Sylvain Chomet	Nominated
Genie Awards	21 March 2005	Best Motion Picture	Paul Cadieux	Won
Genie Awards	21 March 2005	Best Achievement in Music - Original Score	Benoît Charest	Nominated
Grammy Awards	13 February 2005	Best Song Written for Visual Media	Benoît Charest & Sylvain Chomet	Nominated
Los Angeles Film Critics Association Awards	7 January 2004	Best Animated Film	Sylvain Chomet	Won
Los Angeles Film Critics Association Awards	7 January 2004	Best Music	Benoît Charest	Won
New York Film Critics Circle	11 January 2004	Best Animated Film	The Triplets of Belleville	Won
Online Film Critics Society Awards	5 January 2004	Best Animated Film	Sylvain Chomet	Nominated
Online Film Critics Society Awards	5 January 2004	Best Foreign Language Film	The Triplets of Belleville	Nominated
San Diego Film Critics Society Awards	18 December 2003	Best Animated Film	The Triplets of Belleville	Won
Satellite Awards	21 February 2004	Best Animated or Mixed Media Film	The Triplets of Belleville	Won
Toronto Film Critics Association Awards	16 December 2004	Best Animated Film	The Triplets of Belleville	Won
Toronto Film Critics Association Awards	16 December 2004	Best Canadian Film	The Triplets of Belleville	Won

== See also ==
- Arthouse animation
- Independent animation
- List of animated feature films
- List of films about bicycles and cycling
