= One of the Guys (film) =

- French: Ti-Gars
- Directed by: Doris Buttignol
- Starring: Vincent Lamarre
- Cinematography: Geoffroy Beauchemin; Doris Buttignol
- Edited by: Stéphane Elmadjian
- Music by: Jean-Philippe Goncalves
- Production company: Lardux Films
- Release date: 2018
- Running time: 90 minutes
- Country: Canada
- Language: French

One of the Guys (French: Ti-Gars) is a Canadian documentary film, directed by Doris Buttignol and released in 2018. The film profiles Vincent Lamarre, a trans man who was one of the first transgender soldiers ever to come out and begin gender transition while actively serving in the Canadian Forces.

The film received selected film festival screenings in Canada, including at the Cinéfest Sudbury International Film Festival, but was distributed primarily as an episode of the Ici RDI documentary series Les Grands Reportages.
