= DJ Champion =

Canadian electronic musician (born 1969)

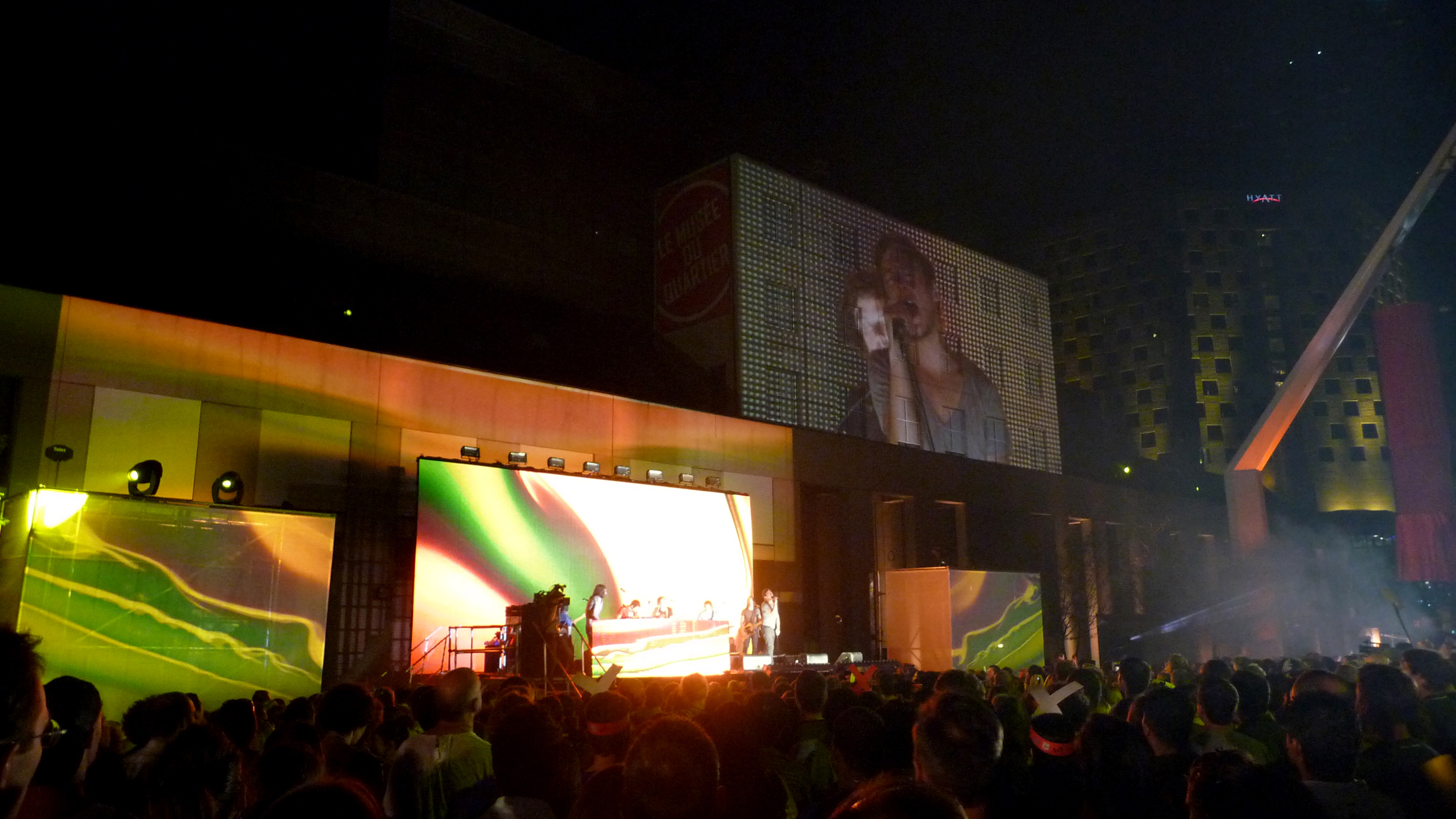
- DJ Champion performing in 2009

Background information
- Born: Maxime Morin; 23 September 1969 (age 56)
- Origin: Montreal, Quebec, Canada
- Genres: Electronica; rock; trip hop; big beat
- Occupations: Musician; composer; songwriter
- Instruments: Guitar; bass; sequencer; drums; sampler
- Years active: 1994–present
- Labels: Bonsound
- Website: djchampion.ca

Maxime Morin (born c. 1969), is a Montreal-based Canadian multi-instrumentalist, better known for his work in electronic music under the name DJ Champion, or simply Champion.

== Early music career ==
Maxime Morin began playing guitar at age 13, mostly specializing in heavy metal music. He went on to play in a few punk and metal bands, but by the age of 25, he found himself moving away from metal and gravitating towards techno. The transition was a gradual one: "Totally, I was like 'Dance music is crap!' So it was actually a big liberation, to lose my fear of dance music," said Morin in a 2004 interview. His girlfriend at the time took him to a warehouse show, and soon he began to attend techno Sundays at Les Foufounes Électriques, a Montreal nightclub better known in the 1980s and 90s for booking punk and alternative rock acts. By 1994, Morin began producing his own dance music and was performing around the Montreal club scene under the names Le Max and Mad Max. By about age 27, he stopped playing guitar altogether.

In the late 1990s, Québécois composer Benoît Charest attended a Mad Max performance. After the show, he approached Morin with a business proposal; the two men went on to become co-owners of Ben & Max Studios—a company specializing in jingles and soundtracks. While Ben & Max Studios became quite successful, in 2001, Morin sold his share to Charest in order to continue his own personal musical career. Even after leaving their business partnership, Morin remained in close contact with Charest, who was working on the score for the 2003 animated film The Triplets of Belleville. Morin would go on to record the bass and percussion on the song "Belleville Rendez-vous", and he also performed the song live, along with Charest and vocalist Béatrice Bonifassi, at the 76th Academy Awards ceremony in 2004—Morin played percussion on a bicycle during the live performance. One of the main protagonists in The Triplets of Belleville is an aspiring cyclist who happens to be named Champion; Morin has stated that he was already performing under that name before the film was created.

== DJ Champion ==
By 2001, Morin had become frustrated with commercial music work. As part owner of Ben & Max Studios, he was able to make a living producing music for advertising and film, but he also felt "empty". He thus decided to focus on making more personal music instead, in a direction where he could combine "the two things that made [him] feel good: Live electronics and guitars ..." He also chose to change his performance name from Mad Max to DJ Champion as a way to poke fun at the growing dance music scene and the resulting outbreak of DJs: "Everybody wanted to be a DJ and wanted to know 'Who's the best DJ?' I was like, 'I don't give a damn about all that crap now. I'm DJ Champion."

The DJ Champion sound was formed by experimenting with the software music sequencer Ableton Live, which is specially designed for live DJing and arranging sounds. Morin would then layer the digitally produced beats and sounds with guitar loops. During live performances, he and his live band would tour as "Champion et ses G Strings" ("Champion and his G Strings"). His live act often consisted of four guitarists, one bassist, a vocalist, and Morin working at his laptop and conducting the band. On occasion, he has also played live drums.

=== Chill'em All ===
2005 saw the release of Champion's debut album, Chill'em All. It included the hit single "No Heaven"—a soulful and bluesy song set against heavy dance beats and noisy guitar riffs. Inspired by Negro Songs of Protest, recorded by music collector Lawrence Gellert, Béatrice Bonifassi (with whom Morin had previously collaborated on the Les Triplettes de Belleville soundtrack) sings a plaintive tune reminiscent of the work songs sung by the chain gangs of the American South in the late 19th and early 20th centuries. "I heard Betty singing those blues songs, and she was the girl for that job," said Morin. The single "No Heaven" was used in both a trailer and the ending credits of Gearbox Software's 2009 video game, Borderlands as well as in the opening credits of the television series The Line and the ending credits of the game Army of Two.

Chill'em All won the Album of the Year Félix Award in 2005 in the electronic/techno category and was nominated for Best Dance Recording at the 2006 Juno Awards. "No Heaven" was nominated at the 2006 CASBY Awards in the category Favourite New Song and won the SOCAN prize for Dance Music in 2007. The album went on to sell over 100,000 copies across Canada.

=== The Remix Album ===
In 2006, Champion released The Remix Album, which featured remixes of tracks from Chill'em All by guest musicians including Akufen and Patrick Watson. The record garnered Morin another Félix Award for Show of the Year, and it was also nominated for Dance Recording of the Year at the 2007 Juno Awards. Morin and Bonifassi worked together again on a version of the 1957 Screamin' Jay Hawkins hit "I Put a Spell on You"; it was used as the theme song of the Kim Nguyen film Truffles, which premiered at the Fantasia Festival in January 2008.

=== Resistance ===
In 2007, Champion composed the soundtrack to the video game Snakes Subsonic.

In 2008, after a long spate of touring and performing, Morin felt that his newer material was starting to sound too similar to the songs of Chill'em All, and he decided to delete an entire studio recording in order to start fresh. He withdrew from the musical scene and began experimenting. He also recruited Pilou Côté, a young musician from Montreal, to provide vocals, replacing Bonifassi, who had since formed the electronic music project Beast with Jean-Philippe Goncalves.

Resistance was released on 15 September 2009, with "Alive Again" as its first single.

=== °1, Best Seller ===
Champion published his third studio album, °1, in 2013, and followed it in 2016 with Best Seller.

=== G Strings band members ===
Current

- Maxime Morin – main producer, keyboards
- Barry Russell – guitar
- Sébastien Blais-Montpetit – guitar
- Pierre-Philippe "Pilou" Côté – vocals
- Stéphane Leclerc – guitar
- Jean-Luc Huet – guitar
- Louis Lalancette – bass

Past

- Betty Bonifassi – vocals
- Manon Chaput – bass
- Blanche Baillargeon — Bass
- Marie-Christine Depestre – vocals

== Illness and recovery ==
On 18 May 2010, it was announced on Champion's official website that all concert dates up to 3 July were cancelled due to a "health matter" that required him to "stop all activities in order to regain his strength". On 7 June, an updated statement was added to his official website, confirming that he would be postponing all performances indefinitely. On 4 July, Champion's management company, Bonsound, officially announced to the press that Morin was suffering from lymphoma. On 27 January 2011, Champion posted an announcement, stating, "I ain't sick anymore", and on 13 April, another post stated that he would "gradually resume performing in the coming weeks".

== Discography ==
- Chill'em All (2005)
- The Remix Album (2006)
- Live (2007)
- Resistance (2009)
- °1 (2013)
- Best Seller (2016)

== Singles chart positions ==
Year	Song	Chart positions		Album
Year	Song	CAN	CAN; Alt.	Album
2007	"No Heaven"	30		Chill'em All
2008	"I Put a Spell on You"	96		The Remix Album
2009	"Alive Again"	–	13	Resistance
2010	"Perfect in Between"	–	18	Resistance
