= Béatrice Bonifassi =

French-Canadian singer (born 1971)

Betty Bonifassi
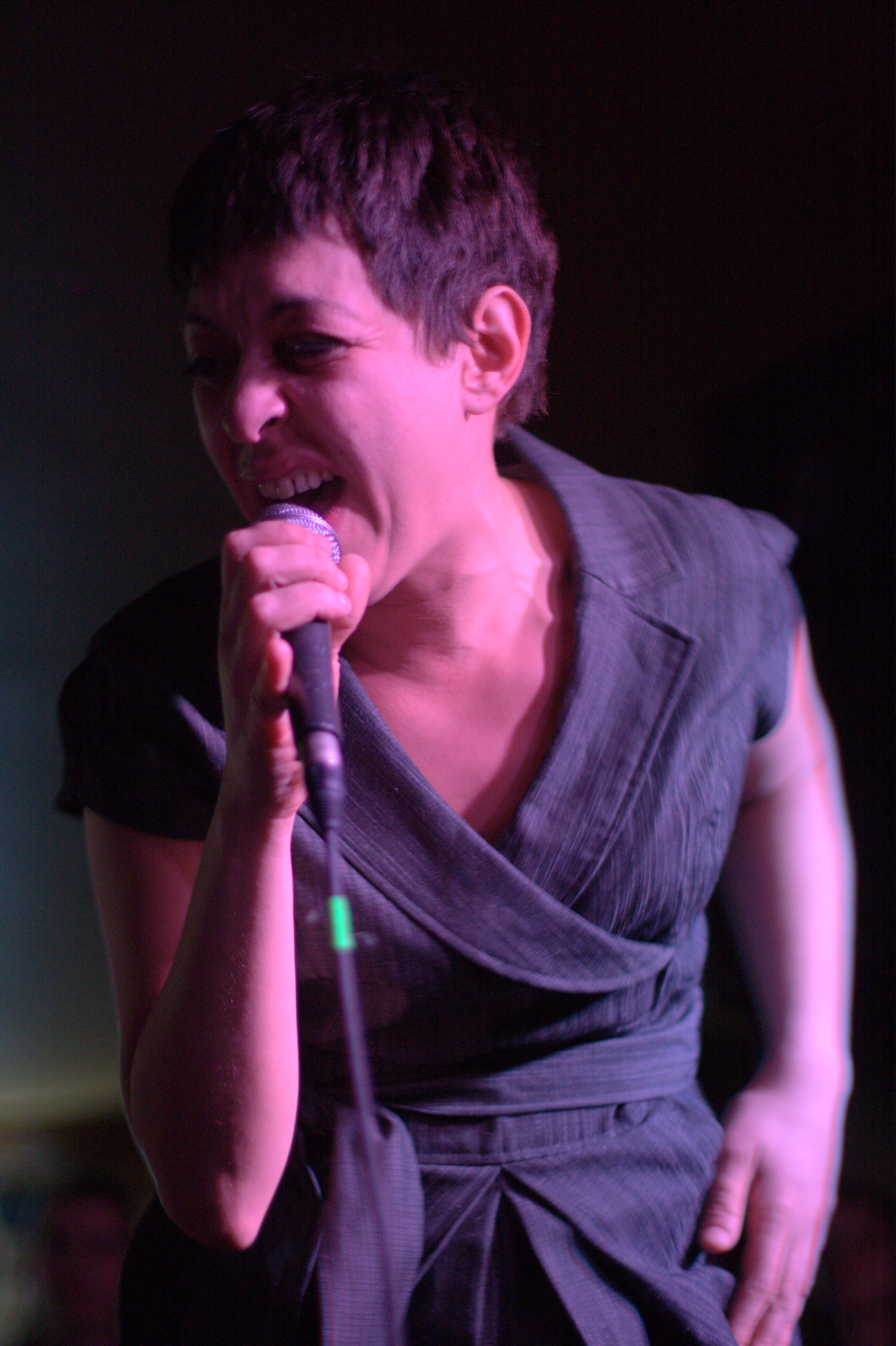
- Bonifassi performing in 2009

Background information
- Born: Béatrice Bonifassi c. 1971 (age 54–55); Nice, France
- Origin: Montreal, Canada
- Genres: Jazz; blues; trip hop; electronic
- Occupations: Singer-songwriter, session musician
- Instrument: Vocals
- Formerly of: Beast

Béatrice "Betty" Bonifassi (born c. 1971) is a Canadian vocalist based in Montreal. She has a deep, contralto singing voice, sometimes referred to as "masculine", which has been compared to that of Shirley Bassey. Bonifassi has performed music of many styles in both English and French—from jazz, to traditional music, to blues, to electronica. In 2003, she gained international exposure when she provided the singing voices for the title characters of the animated film The Triplets of Belleville (Les Triplettes de Belleville). She has collaborated with composer and saxophonist, François D'Amours and has performed and toured with musician Maxime Morin (also known as DJ Champion). Bonifassi appeared as a guest vocalist on Deweare's album High Class Trauma (2006), and she is one half of the electronic music duo Beast.

== Personal life ==
Bonifassi was born in Nice, France, to a Yugoslav mother and a father of Niçois-Italian descent. Raised in a bilingual household, and having studied foreign languages at university, she became interested in other cultures and their traditional music. She has been singing and writing music for two decades.

In 1997, Bonifassi met her now ex-husband, Québécois composer Benoît Charest, while singing Jimi Hendrix covers at a Montreal jazz club. Later that year she moved from France to Montreal to join Charest, and has lived in the Canadian city ever since.

== Work with DJ Champion ==
In the late 1990s, Benoît Charest and Montreal DJ and musician Maxime Morin became co-owners of Ben & Max Studios – a company specializing in jingles and soundtracks. In 2001 Morin sold his share in the company back to Charest in order to continue his own musical career under the pseudonym DJ Champion, however he remained in contact with Bonifassi and Charest: Morin performed bass and percussion on the song "Belleville Rendez-vous", from the 2003 animated film, The Triplets of Belleville and he also performed this song live with Bonifassi and Charest at the 76th Academy Awards ceremony—Morin played percussion on a bicycle during the performance.

In 2004, Bonifassi collaborated with Morin once again (performing as "DJ Champion") on his 2004 debut album, Chill'em All. The album included the hit single "No Heaven" which is a soulful and bluesy song set against heavy dance beats and noisy guitar riffs. Inspired by Negro Songs of Protest, Bonifassi sings a plaintive tune reminiscent of the work songs sung by the chain-gangs of the American South in the late 19th and early 20th centuries.

"I heard Betty singing those blues songs, and she was the girl for that job," said Morin.

With the success of Chill'em All, Bonifassi toured for over two years with "Champion & His G-Strings". In 2008 the pair recorded a version of 1957 Screamin' Jay Hawkins hit "I Put a Spell on You" to be used as the theme song of the Québécois film Truffles.

== Les Triplettes de Belleville ==
Bonifassi and Charest collaborated on the soundtrack for the animated film The Triplets of Belleville (Les Triplettes de Belleville); the film's main song, "Belleville Rendez-vous", was nominated for an Oscar in 2004 and the pair performed the song, along with Maxime Morin, at the 76th Academy Awards ceremony.

Bonifassi stated in a 2004 interview that the experience of performing at the Oscars was "magnifique!"

"It was a magic moment that I shared with my husband; I thought it was brilliant!"

Her work on the Oscar-nominated film "opened doors" for her. After the buzz following her Oscars performance, she got many offers from large record companies in North America and abroad, to record jingles and an album in the same Django/chanson réaliste style; Bonifassi turned down the offers for fear of being pigeonholed, but has stated that she does not discount recording in this style in the future.

== Beast ==
Bonifassi joined forces with percussionist, record producer, and fellow French expat Jean-Philippe Goncalves, to form the band Beast. They released their first album in November 2008.

Beast's sound has been compared to trip hop, only with a bit more aggression. Bonifassi's vocal stylings also lean more towards rap and spoken-word. Bonifassi is the main songwriter and the music is composed and produced by Goncalves. Canadian singer-songwriter Simon Wilcox also assisted Bonifassi (whose native tongue is French) with Beast's lyrics, which are all performed in English.

"Simon really understood my dark side and the sadness of the moment," says Bonifassi. "I really wanted to sing something lyrically rich and powerful."

Goncalves has also stated that the name Beast suits their project very well: "Betty is a real beast," he jokes, "a bête-de-scène."

Beast's debut album was made available on iTunes as of 4 November 2008; its official commercial release was 18 November 2008.

At the end of 2010, Bonifassi and Goncalves announced that they would be taking an indefinite break from the Beast project. Although when asked in a June 2011 interview for Voir whether her break from Beast was a final one Bonifassi replied: "Disons que le retour de Beast n'est pas dans mes plans actuels" ("Let's say the return of Beast is not my current plans.")

Goncalves stated in an interview that the split was not due to any quarrel between himself and Bonifassi. Citing lagging album sales, frustration with the record industry, the tiresome effects of touring, and familial commitments (Bonifassi's son was 9 years old at the time of the split), the bandmates said they would be working separately on their own local projects.

== Solo work ==
During an interview with Danielle Leblanc of Radio-Canada in 2004, she discussed an album she was working on with the composer Francois D'Amour. She described the album as being very "multi-ethnic, with lots of electronic machines" and that she was hoping to find a major record label for its release. On 24 September of that same year, she performed some of these songs during a live solo performance at Montreal's Cabaret Music Hall.

After Bonifassi and Goncalves announced that they would be taking an indefinite hiatus from the Beast project in late 2010, Bonifassi began to focus on solo projects including a performance at the Festival Montréal en lumière on 24 February 2011—making it her first solo performance since her break with Beast. Her performance included renditions of songs by Édith Piaf and Berthe Sylva, as well as a song by the Franco-Monégasque composer Léo Ferré.

Bonifassi performed at the 2011 FrancoFolies festival held in Montreal, first as part of a performance dedicated to Serge Gainsbourg on 15 June, then in her own solo performances on the 17th and 18th.

In 2014, Bonifassi released a self-titled CD in which she interpreted traditional songs of slaves and prisoners, plus two original cuts, "Working It Down" and "How Does It Feel". In 2016, she followed up with a similar CD entitled Lomax, after ethnomusicologist Alan Lomax, who had archived the traditional songs in question (see Slave Songs of the United States.)

In 2018, in collaboration with Robert Lepage, she created SLĀV, a show based on those songs, which launched at the Montreal Jazz Festival. The show caused public protest on the basis of accusations of cultural appropriation and was subsequently canceled by the festival on Bonifassi's decision and out of concern for public safety.
