= 2004 Academy Awards =

2004 Academy Awards may refer to:

- 76th Academy Awards, the Academy Awards ceremony that took place in 2004, honoring the best in film for 2003
- 77th Academy Awards, the Academy Awards ceremony that took place in 2005, honoring the best in film for 2004
