= Plaster (band) =

Canadian band

- Origin: Montreal, Quebec, Canada
- Genres: Electronica, acid jazz, trip hop, electronic rock, minimal techno, nu jazz
- Years active: 2001–present
- Members: Jean-Philippe Goncalves; Alex McMahon; François Plante

Plaster is a Canadian electro-jazz/electro-rock band formed in 2001 in Montreal. Their sound has been compared to such artists as Amon Tobin, Kruder & Dorfmeister and Medeski Martin & Wood. The trio's debut album, First Aid Kit, was released on Nov 10, 2005 and won the ADISQ award for Best Electronic or Techno Album in 2006.

== History ==
Keyboardist Alex McMahon and percussionist Jean-Philippe Goncalves (also of Afrodizz and Beast) met while attending the Cégep de Drummondville. The pair formed Plaster in 2001 and were joined by bassist François Plante (also of Afrodizz) a year later.

The trio's name is derived from a slang term in Québécois for an adhesive bandage and its sound has been described as a mixture of electro-jazz, funk, and drum and bass (however Goncalves has stated in an interview that he finds the term "electro-jazz" to be somewhat pejorative and described their sound as "electro-chunky-jam".) Their sound is at times atmospheric, much like movie soundtracks; in a 2005 interview with the Montreal Gazette, McMahon stated that Plaster was interested in composing a movie score, but the band was still waiting on proposal. Their live performances are improvisational and have been described as having the energy of a rock show. As per Plaster's biography from its official press kit, the band's sound is inspired by the music of Amon Tobin, The Herbaliser, Jazzanova, The Cinematic Orchestra, and Medeski Martin & Wood.

Plaster's debut album First Aid Kit was released on November 10, 2005. The album was originally to be released on the London label Ninja Tune, but due to frustration with the label's push-back of the release date they decided instead to sign with local label La Tribu. The First Aid Kit release party, held at Montreal nightclub La Tulipe, was a great success; much to their own surprise the band opened to a capacity crowd and sold all the CDs they had on hand that night. In 2006 First Aid Kit went on to win the ADISQ award for Best Electronic or Techo Album.

In 2005, the band also collaborated with Lauryn Hill; Hill was in Montreal looking for collaborators for a new project she was developing. Goncalves was invited to audition for her and to demonstrate his programming expertise. He returned the next day for another session when a producer in attendance mentioned that Goncalves also played drums. Goncalves advised Hill that he was a member of a band and an hour later he was joined by his Plaster bandmates. During an interview with the Montreal Gazette Goncalves said of the experience: "We recorded until 6 in the morning, and then she left for New York City." "It was 12 intense hours with la reine de R&B soul (the queen of R&B soul)," said McMahon. The pair were however would not elaborate much more on the collaboration. "We had a lot of fun with her, but it's a delicate topic. I don't know what to say. It was nice," said Goncalves.

In 2011, the band returned to the studio to work on their second album. In an interview with La Presse Goncalves stated that whereas Plaster's first album could be described as electro-jazz, their second album could be described as electro-rock. Titled Let It All Out, the album was released on May 15, 2012, and debuted at number 43 in Canada.
