= Jean-Philippe Goncalves =

Canadian percussionist and music producer (born c. 1978)

Jean-Phi Goncalves
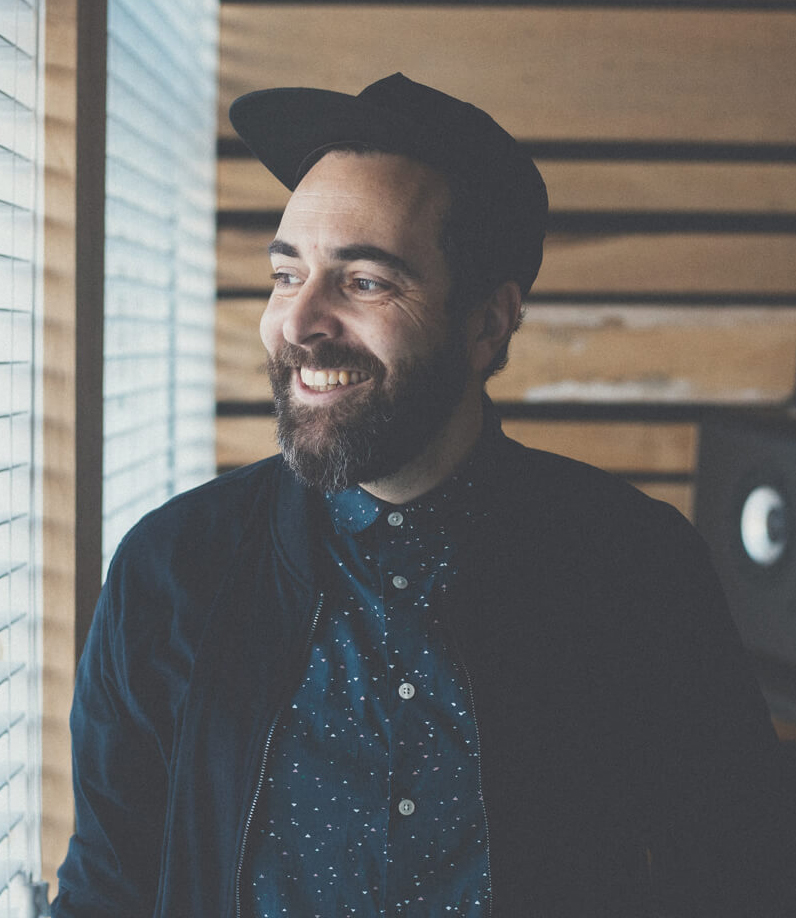

Background information
- Also known as: Jean-Phi Goncalves
- Born: Jean-Philippe Goncalves c. 1978; Angoulême, France
- Origin: Montreal, Quebec, Canada
- Genres: Indietronica, trip hop
- Occupations: Composer, percussionist, record producer
- Instruments: Drums, multi-effects devices, electronic instrumentation/programming

Jean-Philippe "Jean-Phi" Goncalves (born c. 1978) is a French composer, percussionist, and record producer based out of Montreal, Quebec, Canada.

An active member of Montreal's electronic music scene, Goncalves provides percussion for the bands Afrodizz, Plaster, Le Golden and Beast. As a producer he has worked with many French-speaking Quebecer musicians and in 2005 he collaborated with American recording artist Lauryn Hill.

The musician was particularly busy at the 2005 Festival de Musique Émergente (FME)—an annual new music festival held in Rouyn-Noranda, Quebec. During the festival he performed on 3 consecutive days for Afrodizz, Plaster and Dan Thouin respectively, causing one reporter to christen him "the star of the FME".

Goncalves won the award for Best Musical Theme for the Quebec French television drama series Anticosti at the 2026 Prix Gémeaux.

== Plaster ==
Plaster was formed in 2001 by Goncalves and keyboardist Alex McMahon; a year later they were joined by bassist François Plante, also of Afrodizz. The trio's sound has been described as a mixture of electro-jazz, funk, and drum and bass.

Their first album, First Aid Kit, was released in 2005 and won the ADISQ award for Best Electronic or Techo Album in 2006.

In late 2010, after taking a temporary hiatus from his work with the band Beast, he stated that he would be rejoining the band Plaster.

== Afrodizz ==
Afrodizz is an eight-member afrobeat/afrofunk band from Montreal. Their music, a modern mix of afrobeat, jazz and funk, with a touch of trance, has been compared to that of The Herbaliser. Formed in 2002 by Montreal jazz guitarist, Gabriel Aldama, Goncalves has been the band's drummer since its inception.

The band released two albums: Kif Kif in 2004, and Froots in 2006.

== Beast ==
Goncalves first began working with vocalist Betty Bonifassi in 2006 on a project for the video game company Ubisoft in 2006. Like Goncalves, Betty Bonifassi was originally from France and had been an active member of the Montreal music scene for many years. The results of their recording sessions eventually evolved into Beast's aggressive trip rock sound.

The duo's experiments also led to another first for Goncalves, who wound up contributing some of his own vocals to Beast's debut album: "It was the first time I ever had a mic in front of my face", he said in an interview for CBC Radio 3. His vocal tracks were recorded with the intention of replacing them later in production, but Bonifassi insisted that they remain on the album.

At the end of 2010, citing lagging album sales, the tiresome effects of touring, and familial commitments (Bonifassi's son was 9 years old at the time of the split), the bandmates said they would be working separately on their own local projects in the coming year. Goncalves stated in an interview that the split was not due to any sort of quarrel between himself and Bonifassi. He also stated that he would be returning to the Montreal-based electro-jazz band Plaster.

== Le Golden ==
Originally formed in 2007 under the name Jedi Electro, Le Golden is yet another band of which Goncalves is a member. Le Golden's other members include Alex McMahon (also of Plaster), Jean-François Lemieux, Martin Lizotte and Dan Thouin.

== Other projects ==
Goncalves has worked as a producer for many French-speaking Quebecer musicians, including Pierre Lapointe, Jean-Pierre Ferland, Ariane Moffatt and Daniel Bélanger.

In 2005 he and fellow Plaster bandmates Alex McMahon and François Plante collaborated with Lauryn Hill. In 2011 Goncalves and McMahon also composed an original electronic score for the Cirque Éloize production titled Cirque Éloize iD. Later that same year Goncalves and his Plaster bandmates founded XS, a company specializing in composing music for use in film, advertising and multimedia projects. One of the company's first projects included creating sound effects and theme music for the grameshow Le tricheur (the cheater) which premiered on the Canadian French language television network TVA in January 2011.

He has also composed music for a number of films, including Carface (Autos Portraits), One of the Guys (Ti-Gars), Jouliks and Billie Blue (Cœur de slush), and had a small acting role as Jean-Luc Godard in the 2013 film Hunting the Northern Godard (La Chasse au Godard d'Abbittibbi).

Goncalves won the award for Best Musical Theme for the Quebec French television drama series Anticosti at the 2026 Prix Gémeaux (the French-language equivalent to the Gemini Awards.)

== Personal life ==
Goncalves has two children with his spouse, fashion designer Eve Gravel. As of 2017, the couple lived in the Old Rosemont neighbourhood of Montreal.
