= Chill'em All =

Studio album by Champion
- Released: November 2004
- Genre: Electronica
- Length: 50:35
- Label: Saboteur Records
- Producer: Maxime Morin

Champion chronology
Chill'em All (2004)	The Remix Album (2006)

Chill'em All is the debut album by Canadian electronic musician Champion, released in 2004 on Saboteur Records.

A 32-second cut of "No Heaven" serves as the opening theme for the 2009 Canadian TV series The Line. "No Heaven" was also used in a trailer for the First-person shooter/Role-playing game Borderlands, in addition to playing over the game's end credits. Also featured in the endings of the video game Army of Two. "Two Hoboes" was used in the EA Sports game UEFA Champions League 2006-07.

== Track listing ==
No.	Title	Length
1.	"Sergio's Trio"	3:08
2.	"No Heaven"	3:26
3.	"NnGg"	4:24
4.	"The Plow"	4:06
5.	"Gore Gore"	4:03
6.	"Die in Peace"	5:49
7.	"Keep On"	4:25
8.	"Tawoumga"	9:28
9.	"Tavern"	4:01
10.	"Two Hoboes"	3:30
11.	"Guy Doune"	4:15

== Certifications ==
Country	Certification	Sales/shipments
Canada	Gold	50,000
