= La Bolduc =

French Canadian singer and musician

Mary Rose-Anne Bolduc (née Travers)
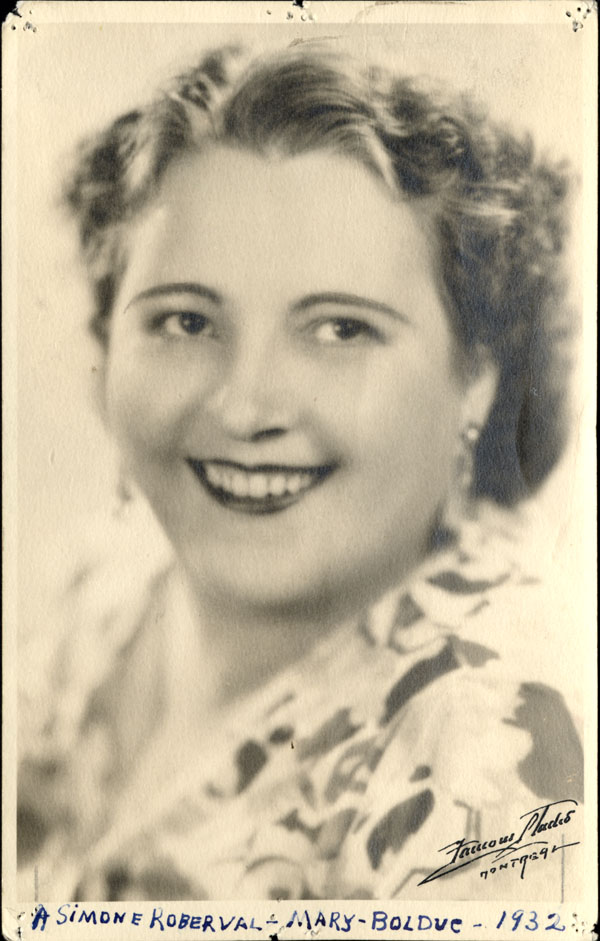
- Publicity photo of La Bolduc
- Born: June 4, 1894; Newport (Chandler), Quebec, Canada
- Died: February 20, 1941 (aged 46); Montreal, Quebec, Canada
- Other name: La Bolduc
- Occupation: Singer-Songwriter

Mary Rose-Anne Bolduc (née Travers; June 4, 1894 – February 20, 1941) was a musician and singer of French Canadian music. She was known as Madame Bolduc or La Bolduc. During the peak of her popularity in the 1930s, she was known as the Queen of Canadian Folk Singers. Bolduc is often considered to be Quebec's first singer-songwriter. Her style combined the traditional folk music of Ireland and Quebec, usually in upbeat, comedic songs.

== Biography ==
=== Childhood ===
Mary Rose-Anne Travers was born in Newport, Quebec, in the Gaspé region. Her father, Lawrence Travers, was an Anglophone of Irish heritage, and her mother, Adéline Cyr, was of mixed French Canadian and Mi'kmaq heritage. Her family included five full siblings, and an additional six half-siblings from her father's first marriage. Bolduc and her eleven siblings spoke English at home, but also spoke French fluently. The family was extremely poor, but Bolduc attended school for a time, becoming literate in French.

Her only music teacher was her father, who taught her how to play the instruments that were traditional in Quebec culture of the era: the fiddle, accordion, harmonica, spoons and jaw harp. She learned traditional music from the two heritages, both Irish melodies and French-Canadian folk tunes. The family did not own a record player, piano or sheet music, so Bolduc learned jigs and folk songs from memory or by ear. She was giving casual public performances by the spring of 1908, when she played the accordion at the logging camp where she worked as a cook and her father as a lumberjack.

=== Early working life ===
In 1908, at the age of thirteen, Bolduc was sent to live with her half-sister Mary-Ann in Montreal, Quebec. Mary-Ann worked as a maid and had secured Bolduc a job as a maid in the house of Dr Lesage. She was paid $15 per month, in addition to room and board. A few years later she took a job at a textile mill, which paid $15 weekly for 60 hours of work per week.

On August 17, 1914, she married Édouard Bolduc, a plumber. The couple's first child was stillborn. Denise Bolduc was born in July 1916, Jeannette Bolduc in July 1917 and Roger Bolduc in August 1918. Roger died at the age of ten months and Jeanette at two years. The couple experienced more bad fortune with pregnancies and children; of the twelve or thirteen pregnancies, only four children reached adulthood. The family was quite poor, and in 1921 when Édouard had difficulty finding work they decided to move to Springfield, Massachusetts. Édouard Bolduc's sister was living there at the time. They returned to Montreal a year later, as Édouard had been unable to secure work in Springfield. During this time Mary Bolduc entertained both friends and family with her musical talents. Among her friends were amateur musicians who sometimes performed with the Veillées du bon vieux temps at the Monument-National under Conrad Gauthier.

=== Musical career ===
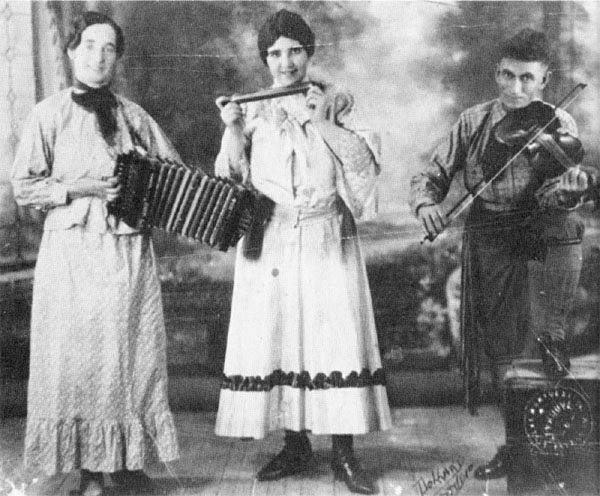
Mary Bolduc with fellow musicians, 1928

When Conrad Gauthier's troupe was missing a folk violinist for a performance, one of Bolduc's friends arranged for her to fill in for the absent performer. Gauthier was suitably impressed by her performance and asked her to return for subsequent productions. The family was always in need of money and the small income she earned this way was useful. Bolduc became a regular player with Gauthier's troupe by 1928, playing the violin or the jaw harp. Her work with them expanded to include other instrumental work and even some comic acting.

Bolduc was recommended by folk singer Ovila Légaré to musical producer Roméo Beaudry of the Compo Company. Beaudry signed musicians for French language recordings on the Starr Records label. Beaudry signed her to a recording contract to make four 78 rpm records, paying her $25 per side. She made her first recording in April 1929, the French folk song Y'a longtemps que je couche par terre on side A, and an instrumental reel on side B. The record was a commercial flop. Her next two recordings also had meagre sales.

Bolduc's second recording was released for Christmas of 1929. The first side had an original song of Bolduc's, La Cuisinière. Side B was an adaptation of an English folk song titled Johnny Monfarleau. The record sold more than twelve thousand copies, which was unprecedented in Quebec. Bolduc earned a total of $450 from the sales and became a household name in Quebec. With this success, Beaudry had Bolduc releasing a double-sided record every month. Bolduc recorded an additional four songs in January 1930. Nine more songs were recorded in April that year. By the end of 1930, she had recorded more than 30 songs. During this time, she collaborated on no less than fifty-six recordings of other artists. Most of these recordings did not credit her. Bolduc sang accompaniments or played instruments for recordings by Juliette Béliveau, Eugène Daignault, Ovila Légaré, Alfred Montmarquette, Adélard St. Jean, and possibly others.

Bolduc's first headlining performance came in November 1930, in Lachute at a costume ball. The audience was extremely receptive to her music and she was inspired to start a show that focused on her own songs. In March 1931 she took an offer from a burlesque company at the Théâtre Arlequin de Québec to perform as their main act. From this, she embarked on a three-month tour of Quebec with Juliette d'Argère. Starting in Hull in May 1931, they travelled western Quebec and Montreal, finishing in Sept-Îles in July. In 1931, her rising popularity increased the cost of her sheet music from four for one dollar to three for one dollar.

Bolduc formed her own touring troupe in 1932, named La Troupe du bon vieux temps. She hired Jean Grimaldi to direct the tours. The performances contained elements of both vaudeville and traditional folk music. Their first tours were around the Montreal area, and from August through December 1932 they gave fifty shows. The tours were a great success in Quebec with Bolduc earning $2000 from her first tour, compared to $500 – $1000 annually she got from royalties. The troupe went on a tour of New England from April through June 1934, and a second tour of New England that autumn. They toured across Quebec, and in 1935 toured the French speaking areas of northern Ontario. They went on additional tours of New England in 1937 and 1939.

As the 1930s progressed, Bolduc's record sales began to slump, but her income from touring remained good. Bolduc stuck to her folk music style as the record buying public turned increasingly to jazz and popular music. She produced eighteen records in 1930 and 10 in 1931, but with her declining sales she recorded nothing from July 1932 until she released a single album in March 1935, and then four more in 1936. In 1936, the family was able to afford a nanny to attend to the children while Bolduc toured.

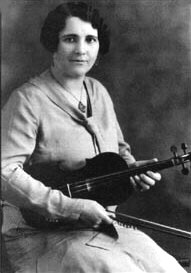
Mary Bolduc with a fiddle

Beginning in 1935, her daughter Denise appeared with her as a pianist. Other children occasionally appeared as backup singers, and her daughter Lucienne recorded L'Enfant volé.

Bolduc was seriously injured in June 1937 in Rivière-du-Loup when her tour company's car was in a head-on collision. She suffered a broken leg, a broken nose and a concussion. She was sent to a hospital in Rimouski for treatment, where doctors discovered a cancerous tumour. She began radiation treatment at the Radium Institute in Montreal, and engaged in practically no musical endeavours at this point, making no stage appearances for a full year. Her insurance company refused to pay for her damages, notably the concussion that caused memory loss and loss of concentration, which prevented her from writing songs. The suit ended badly as Bolduc did not use banks and had no record of her income to prove loss of income. Of her total damages and lost income, Bolduc recovered only $1500.

Bolduc began limited touring again in the summer of 1938, only in the Montreal area. She made a radio broadcast in January 1939, and made two recordings in February 1939. One of those songs, Les Souffrances de mon accident (French "The sufferings of my accident") was on her accident. She died of cancer on February 20, 1941, in Montreal and was buried in the Cimetière Notre-Dame-des-Neiges.

== Musical style ==
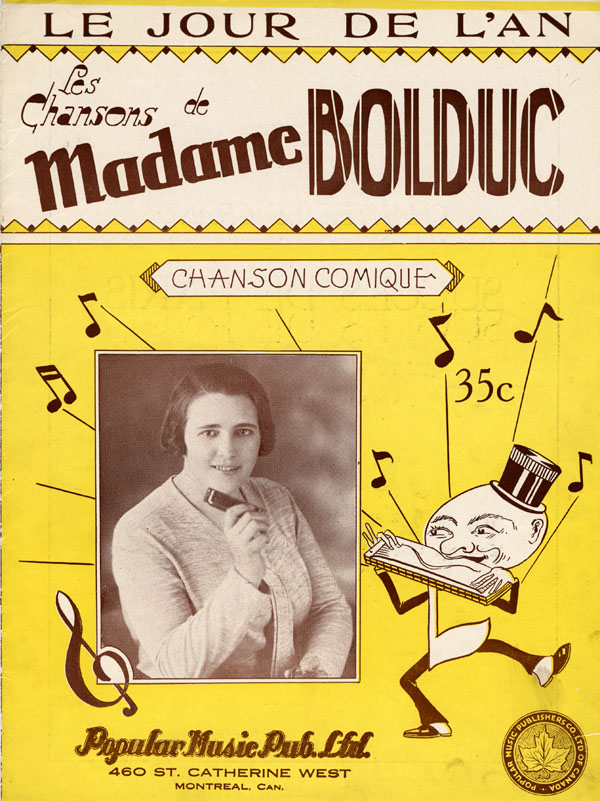
Sheet music for Le Jour de l'An

Bolduc never had any formal music lessons, and developed her own style under the influence of her father's teaching and the musical traditions of Irish folk music and Québécois folk tunes. Her songs tended to be happy and comical with lively rhythms. Her self-written songs often used existing melodies from folk tunes or dances, combined with lyrics she wrote herself. For instance, she wrote the song Les Cinq Jumelles about the Dionne Quintuplets, which was set to the tune of "Little Brown Jug". In other cases, she adapted popular contemporary American songs.

Bolduc often used the technique of the enumerative song, which lists something such as foods or tasks. This technique was traditional in French-Canadian folk songs, derived from similar French traditions. Bolduc also employed the traditional French folk song style of the dialogue song, usually a duet with a man, where the song is a conversation or debate between the man and the woman. One such song was Mademoiselle, dites-moi donc, which she recorded with Ovila Légaré and featured the two of them bantering and flirting comedically. She often wrote in the style derived from traditional English broadside ballads, which tell current news to the tunes of traditional songs. One such song by Bolduc is La chanson du bavard, which notably employs an introduction inviting the listener to hear a tale, as is common in broadside ballads. Other topical ballads by Bolduc include Les Américains about Americans coming to Montreal during Prohibition to obtain liquor and the unrecorded Si je pouvais tenir Hitler, which she wrote a few days after the outbreak of World War II.

Her music relied heavily upon the harmonica and the fiddle, the traditional instruments of reels in Quebec. Her singing also adopted a nasal style, and her pitch was relaxed, both of which are found traditionally. Her singing often featured turlutage, which derives from Irish and Scottish musical traditions. Most often she employed this technique in reels, such as her song Reel turluté.

Her touring troupe La Troupe du bon vieux temps gave fairly consistent performances. Mary Bolduc opened the show with her newest songs. The troupe then performed comedy sketches, ensemble songs, folk songs and vaudeville routines. Most performances included a segment where amateurs performed, sometimes for cash prizes. Bolduc closed with some of her newest or most topical songs.

Bolduc's lyrics are predominantly French, but frequently include a few words or lines in English. This was reflective of her country upbringing in Gaspésie, where the two languages mingle. The recordings were marketed to working class francophone audiences, in small towns and rural areas where people had traditional values.

== Professional image ==
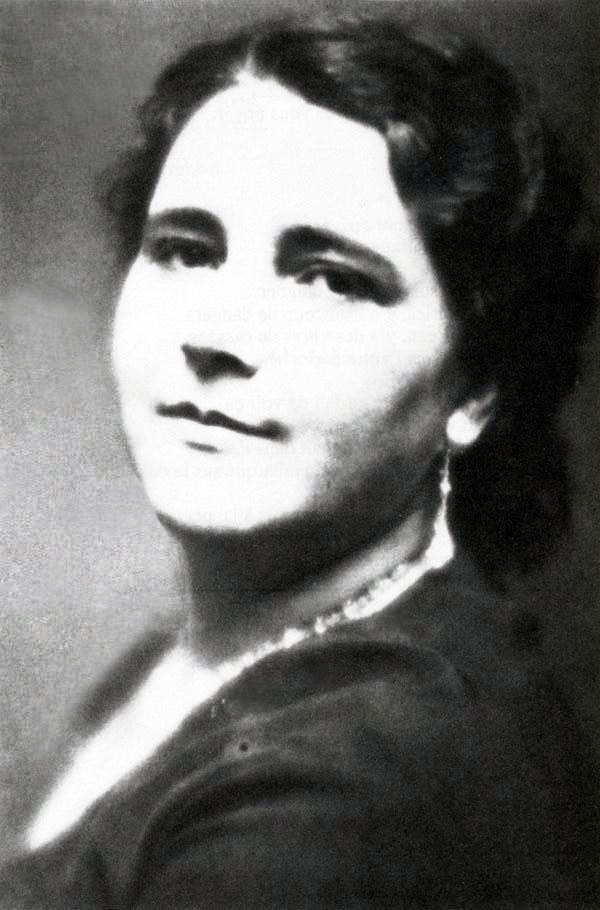
Mary Bolduc, circa 1930

Singing and stage careers were not well regarded in Quebec society of the 1920s and 1930s, especially for women. To avoid gossip and to keep a good reputation, Bolduc was always credited under her married name Madame Édouard Bolduc, both at live performances and on recordings. She attempted to include her family in her activities as much as possible. Her husband Édouard accompanied her troupe on their 1932 and 1934 tours. Her eldest daughter Denise joined the troupe in 1935 as a pianist.

== Recordings ==
Recordings of about 100 of her songs survive. Many of those that have not survived were written for special occasions.

- April 12, 1929: Ya longtemps que je couche par terre and La Gaspésienne.
- August 13, 1929: Gendre and belle-mère and Quand on s'est vu.
- November 22, 1929: Valse Denise and Reel de la goélette.
- December 6, 1929: La cuisinière and Johnny Monfarleau.
- January 15, 1930: La servante and Regardez donc mouman.
- January 29, 1930: Arthimise marie le bedeau and Tourne ma roulette.
- March 11, 1930: Le bonhomme et la bonne femme and Si vous avez une fille qui veut se marier.
- March 18, 1930: Reel comique and Galop des pompiers.
- April 3, 1930: Le joueur de violon and Ton amour, ma Catherine.
- April 30, 1930: Reel turluté, Gigue des commères (Duet with Alfred Monmarquette), Fantaisie écossaise (Duet with Alfred Monmarquette) and Reel Balmoral (Duet with Alfred Monmarquette).
- May 14, 1930: Fricassez-vous, Valse turlutée and La morue.
- May 20, 1930: Clogue à Ti-Zeph Parent (with Alfred Monmarquette and Adélard Saint-Jean), Reel des barbouillés (with Alfred Monmarquette and Adélard Saint-Jean).
- June 18, 1930: Mon vieux est jaloux and La pitoune.
- June 27, 1930: Un petit bonhomme avec un nez pointu and Chez ma tante Gervais.
- August 21, 1930: Toujours "L'R-100" and Les maringouins.
- September 23, 1930: Ça va venir découragez-vous pas and Fin Fin Bigaouette.
- October 27, 1930: La bastringue and Mademoiselle, dites-moi donc.
- November 4, 1930: Les agents d'assurance.
- November 5, 1930: Chapleau fait son Jour de l'An (Duet with Ovila Légaré) and C'est comme ça qu'ça s'passe (Duet with Ovila Légaré).
- November 13, 1930: Rouge carotte.
- November 14, 1930: Le Jour de lAn and Le bas de Noël.
- December 9, 1930: La petite boulangère (Duet with Ovila Légaré) and Mechetagouine (Duet with Ovila Légaré).
- December 10, 1930: La grocerie du coin and La gigueuse (with Albertine Villeneuve and Thomas).
- December 12, 1930: Le propriétaire.
- January 15, 1931: Fêtons le Mardi-gras and Un vieux garçon gêné.
- February 3, 1931: Les filles de campagne and Nos braves habitants.
- March 26, 1931: Le sauvage du nord and Jean-Baptiste Beaufouette.
- April 9, 1931: L'ouvrage aux Canadiens and La chanson du bavard.
- July 7, 1931: C'est la fille du vieux Roupi and Il va m'faire mourir c'gars-là.
- July 8, 1931: La côte Nord and Aux chauffeurs d'automobile.
- September 15, 1931: Ah! C'qu'il est slow 'Tit Joe, Chanson de la bourgeoise and Le commerçant des rues.
- October 8, 1931: Tit Noir a le mal imaginaire.
- November 6, 1931: R'garde donc c'que t'as d'l'air and Danse en souliers d'boeufs.
- November 7, 1931: Bien vite c'est le Jour de l'an and Voilà le père Noël qui nous arrive.
- January 20, 1932: J'ai un bouton sur la langue, Rose cherche à se marier, Quand j'étais chez mon père and Les femmes.
- May 5, 1932: L'enfant volé, Si les saucisses pouvaient parler, Les policemen and Les Américains.
- July 2, 1932: En revenant des foins, Les conducteurs de chars, Les vacances and Sans travail.
- March 6, 1935: Les cinq jumelles and La Gaspésienne pure laine.
- March 20, 1936: Les colons Canadiens and La lune de miel.
- April 15, 1936: Les médecins, Gédéon amateur and Les pompiers de St-Éloi.
- April 27, 1936: Arrête donc, Mary.
- August 24, 1936: Les belles-mères and Quand J'ai vingt ans.
- February 23, 1939: Tout le monde a la grippe, Le voleur de poule, Je m'en vais au marché and Les souffrances de mon accident.

=== Unrecorded original songs ===
Songs known to have been written and performed by Mary Bolduc but never recorded include:

- La Reine des Bières
- As-tu vu l'éclipse?
- Le nouveau gouvernement
- La visite royale
- Si je pouvais tenir Hitler
- Roosevelt est un peu là
- On déménage
- Le secours direct

== Legacy ==
Some debate exists among historians as to whether Mary Bolduc or Félix Leclerc should be identified as Quebec's first singer-songwriter. Either way, both had significant influence on the development of Quebec's folk music culture from the 1930s onwards. Bolduc was the most widely known folk music singer of Quebec in the 1930s. Her humorous images of daily life, her realism in depicting the society of the time, and her satirical characters all appear in the work of subsequent singer-songwriters. Although it was received poorly by critics of the day, Bolduc's use of colloquialisms and working-class vocabulary influenced future musicians like Gilles Vigneault and Clémence DesRochers. Other Québécois musicians with notable influences from Bolduc include Oscar Thiffault, whose style was descended from Bolduc, André Gagnon, whose composition Les Turluteries is based on Bolduc's use of turlutage, and Robert Charlebois, who also sang in the dual French Canadian and English derived style and used the everyday slang of Quebec.

On August 12, 1994, a stamp was released that honoured her with her portrait on a Canadian postage stamp. The stamp was designed by Pierre Fontaine based on images from Bernard Leduc. Seven and a half million copies were printed. The same year, a park was created in her hometown of Newport named Mary Travers Park.

In 2002, Mary Bolduc was made a MasterWorks honoree by the Audio-Visual Preservation Trust of Canada.

La Bolduc, a biographical film about Bolduc by director François Bouvier, was released in Quebec in April 2018. The film stars Debbie Lynch-White as Bolduc.

== See also ==
- List of Quebec musicians
- Music of Quebec
- Culture of Quebec
