= La Cuisinière =

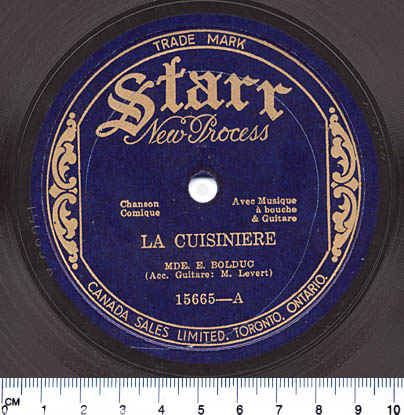

Single by La Bolduc, Médart Levert
- Released: March 1930
- Recorded: December 6, 1929
- Genre: Quebecois Folk Music
- Label: Starr Records
- Songwriter(s): Mary Bolduc
- Producer(s): Roméo Beaudry

La Cuisinière is a song written by Mary Bolduc and released by the Starr Record Company on her fourth record, alongside Johnny Monfarleau. Although it was her fourth release, this was her first record to achieve any commercial success. La Cuisinière was very successful, selling twelve thousand copies in Quebec, which was unprecedented sales for a record at the time. The success of the song made Bolduc a household name in Quebec.

The song tells of the encounters of a domestic servant with various suitors. The overall tone is humorous. This follows a long tradition of French comedic folk songs dealing with rejected suitors. The lyrics are set in five versus, each of four lines. Each verse ends with the phrase: Hourra pour la cuisinière. The general rhyming scheme is rhyming couplets, with the first two and second two lines of each verse rhyming. The last two lines do not rhyme, however.

The melody follows an AABC pattern, where A, B and C are musical phrases that last four bars. Canadian folk songs of the time often employed 16 bar phrases such as this, and it would have been a common pattern in the Gaspé logging camps where Bolduc first performed publicly. The melody itself comes from a folk tune in Acadia. The pitch range is a ninth, common for such folk songs.

The song shows some influence from broadside ballads, a traditional Irish song type. It has a very regular pattern that both the music and the lyrics follow. It also opens with the phrase Je vais vous dire quelques mots which is very similar to the traditional opening of broadside ballads, O come ye listen to my story. The influence of French folk music can be seen in the use of enumeration and assonance.
