= Alfred Montmarquette =

Alfred Montmarquette (6 April 1871 - 24 May 1944) was a Canadian folksong composer and accordionist.

== Biography ==
Born in New York on April 6, 1871, Montmarquette taught himself to play the accordion at the age of twelve and had become proficient by his teenage years. Unable to sustain himself as a professional musician, he worked as a mason. He moved to Montreal in the 1920s, and was over fifty years old when Conrad Gauthier's Veillées du bon vieux temps made him well known.

Between 1928 and 1932, he recorded more than 110 pieces for Starr Records, and also recorded with Ovila Légaré, Eugène Daigneault and Mary Bolduc.

He died in an insane asylum in Montréal on 24 May 1944.

== Songs ==
- Rose Alma Polka
- Marche des collégiens
- Galop des pompiers
