= French-Canadian music =

Music genre

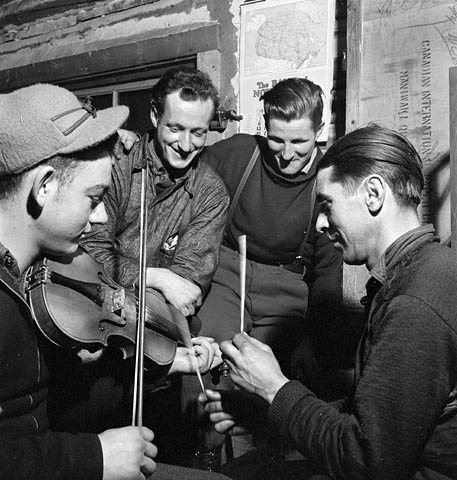
Québécois lumberjacks playing the fiddle, with sticks for percussion, in a lumber camp in 1943.

French Canadian music is music derived from that brought by the early French settlers to what is now Quebec and other areas throughout Canada, or any music performed by the French Canadian people. Since the arrival of French music in Canada, there has been much intermixing with the Celtic music of Anglo-Canada.

French-Canadian folk music is generally performed to accompany dances such as the jig, jeux dansé, ronde, cotillion, and quadrille. The fiddle is perhaps the most common instrument utilized and is used by virtuosos such as Jean Carignan, Jos Bouchard, and Joseph Allard. Also common is the diatonic button accordion, played by the likes of Philippe Bruneau and Alfred Montmarquette. Spoons, bones, and jaw harps are also played in this music. A distinctive part of the French Canadian sound is podorythmie ("foot rhythm"), which involves using the feet to tap out complex rhythmic patterns, it is quite similar to tap dancing but is done from a seated position, and can be done simultaneously while playing the violin or other small instruments.

French settlers in New France established their musical forms in the nascent colonies of Canada (New France) and (New France) before the British conquest, completed in 1759. Already diverging from the music of France, Canadian and Acadian music were becoming distinct from each other, reinforced by the different experience of the regions under British rule, with Acadians experiencing a mass expulsion and partial return. The French (Quebecois) tradition continued to spread westward, however, in the form of the camp songs and rowing songs of the voyageurs, professional canoemen in the employ of the fur trading companies. In the west this tradition intermingled with others to give birth to Metis music.

There was no scholarly study of French Canadian song until Ernest Gagnon's 1865 collection of 100 folk songs. In 1967, Radio-Canada released The Centennial Collection of Canadian Folk Songs (much of which was focused on French-Canadian music), which helped launch a revival of Quebec folk. Singers like Yves Albert, Edith Butler, and, especially, Félix Leclerc and Gilles Vigneault, helped lead the way. The 1970s saw purists like Le Rêve du Diable and La Bottine Souriante continue the trend. As Quebec folk continued to gain in popularity, artists like Harmonium, Kate & Anna McGarrigle, Jim Corcoran, Bertrand Gosselin, and Paul Piché found a mainstream audience.

Since 1979, Quebec music artists have been recognized with the Felix Award.

In 2017, Universal Music Canada launched Canada 150: A Celebration of Music, a six-disc album to celebrate the 150th anniversary of Canada. It was criticised for not including any French-language song.

== See also ==
- "C'est l'Halloween", popular French-language children's song
- Franco-country
- French-Canadian rock
- French Canadian hip hop
- Music of Quebec
