= Thiffault =

Thiffault is a surname of French origin. People with that name include:

- Charles Thiffault (1938–2025), Canadian ice hockey assistant coach
- Leo Thiffault (1944–2018), Canadian ice hockey player
- Oscar Thiffault (1912–1998), Canadian folk musician
