= Rock music of Canada =

Canadian contributions to rock music

Rock music of Canada is a wide and diverse part of the general music of Canada, beginning with American and British style rock and roll in the mid-20th century. Since then Canada has had a considerable impact on the development of the modern popular music called rock. Canada has produced many of the genre's most significant groups and performers, while contributing substantively to the development of the most popular subgenres, which include pop rock, progressive rock, country rock, folk rock, hard rock, punk rock, heavy metal and indie rock.

== Background ==
Since before Canada's emergence as a nation in 1867, the country has produced its own composers, musicians and ensembles. From the 17th century onward, Canada has developed a music infrastructure that includes concert halls, conservatories, academies, performing arts centres, record companies, radio stations and national music video television channels. The success of the gramophone at the beginning of the 20th century allowed Canadian songwriters to broaden their potential audiences. Following quickly on the gramophone's spread came World War I. The war was the catalyst for the writing and recording of large numbers of Canadian-written popular songs, some of which achieved lasting international commercial success. The 1920s saw Canada's first radio stations, this allowed Canadian songwriters to contribute some of the most famous popular music of the early 20th century.

Canada has produced a number of notable international recording artists who appeared on the Billboard record sales chart called Hit Parade first published in 1936. Among them was the World War II era bandleader, Guy Lombardo, who with his brother has sold an estimated 250 million phonograph records during their lifetimes. Over the course of his career, which began in 1944, Montreal's jazz virtuoso Oscar Peterson released over 200 recordings, won seven Grammy Awards, and received many other awards and honors. Oscar Peterson is considered to have been one of the greatest pianists of all time. Nova Scotia-born and raised Hank Snow who signed with RCA Victor in 1936 and went on to become one of America's most innovative country music superstars.

== History ==
=== 1950s ===
Rock and roll arose in the United States in the late 1940s after World War II, from a combination of the rhythms of African American blues, country and gospel music. Though elements of rock and roll can be heard in Canadian country records of the 1930s–1940s, and in American blues records from the 1920s, rock and roll did not acquire its name until the 1950s. "Rock" or its forerunners electric blues (Chicago blues) and rhythm and blues (Jump blues) was first heard in the late 1940s by Canadians who were living close enough to the American border to tune into American radio station broadcasts.

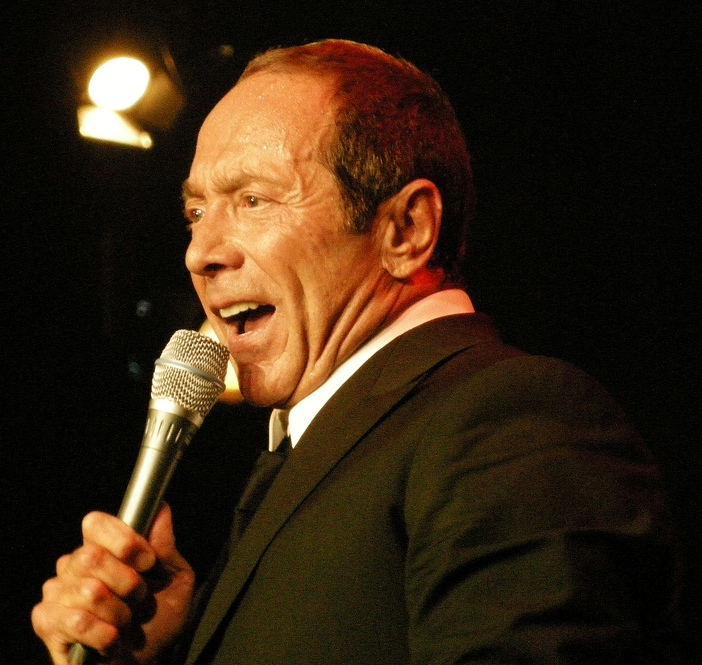
Paul Anka, 2007

In 1951, Cleveland, Ohio disc jockey Alan Freed began playing rhythm and blues music for a multi-racial audience, and is credited with first using the phrase "rock and roll" to describe the musical sound of the Doo-wop vocal groups and the rockabilly singers who emerged in the 1950s. The Four Lads, from Toronto, were one of the first groups to capitalize on this sound and become a prominent act in the Canadian rhythm and blues scene, producing their first hit in 1952 called "Mocking Bird". Their most famous hit was "Moments to Remember", which first reached the Billboard magazine charts on September 3, 1955. Emerging in the mid-1950s, on near equal-footing to American popular music, Canadian popular music enjoyed considerable success at home and abroad.

By 1954 the name "rock and roll" had become the common name of the popular music of the day. Rhythm and blues (R&B coined in 1949) was too broad a term, because R&B was a category that included most forms of race music, which generally had adult-based lyrics. The Crew-Cuts, The Diamonds and The Four Lads would emerge from this new marketing of rhythm and blues to appeal to a white audience leaving an indelible mark on the Doo-wop days. Often Canadian records of this period were simply covers of pop hits, and rhythm and blues oldies. 1958 saw Canada produced its first rock and roll teen idol Paul Anka, who went to New York City where he auditioned for ABC with the song, "Diana". This song brought Anka instant stardom and he became the first Canadian to have a number one on the US Billboard charts in the rock and roll era. "Diana" is one of the best selling 45s in music history. He followed up with four songs that made it into the Top 20 in 1958, making him one of the biggest teen idols of the time.

Most Canadians with successful recording careers in the 1950s had moved to the US, where the population level and media exposure would eclipse that of Canada. Ronnie Hawkins, an Arkansas born rockabilly singer, moved to Canada in 1958, becoming a prominent figure in Canadian blues and rock devoting his life to popularizing Canadian musicians. He formed a backing band called The Hawks, which produced some of the earliest Canadian rock stars. Among them were the members of The Band, who began touring with Bob Dylan in 1966, and then struck out on their own in 1968.

=== 1960s ===
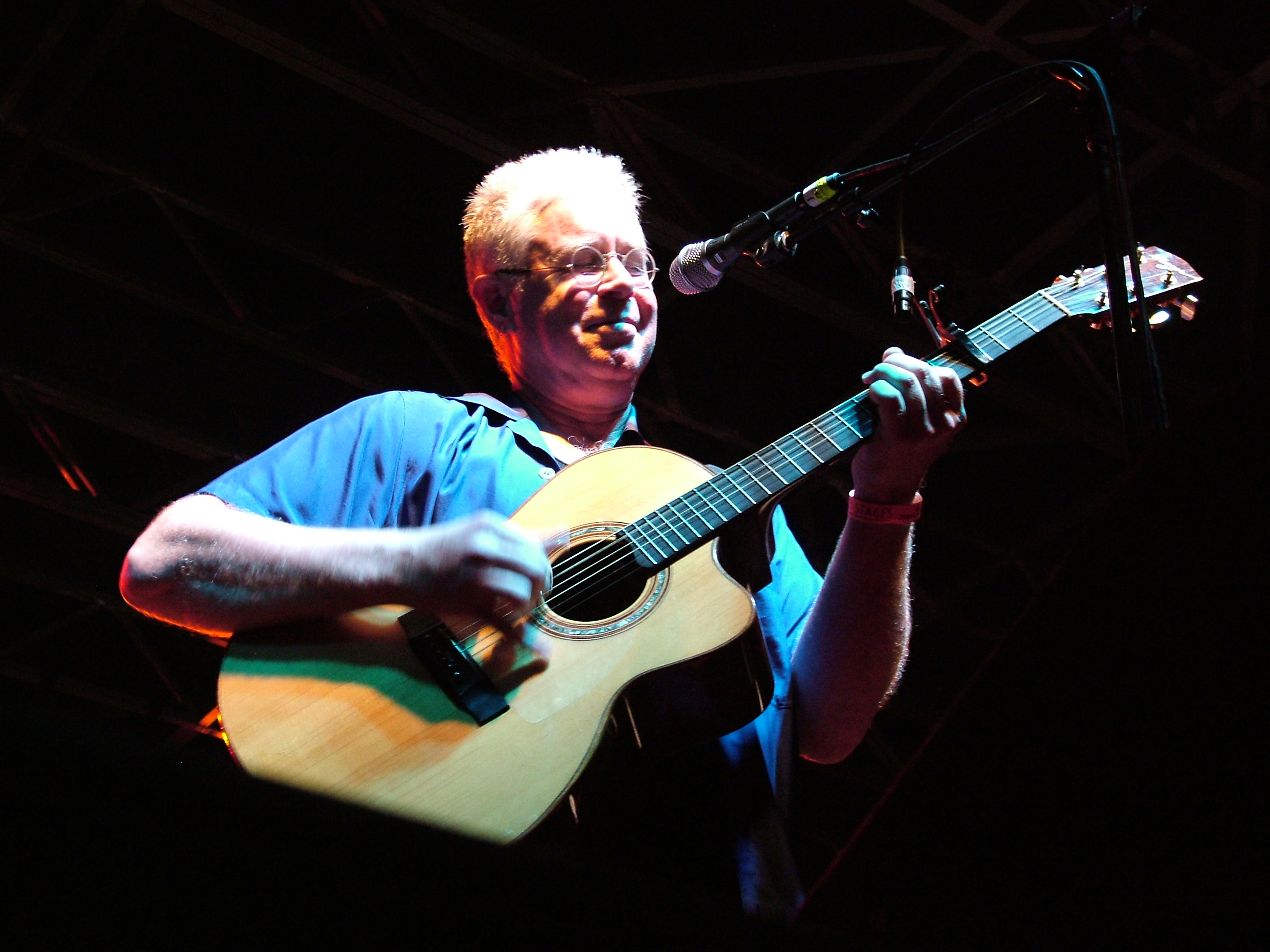
Bruce Cockburn performing at the City Stages festival in Birmingham, Alabama, United States.

As the late fifties gave way to the sixties, stars of the previous decade were still producing hits, but they were quickly losing ground as they struggled to find material that clicked with this new and energetic generation. However, "The Stroll" continued to be a popular dance craze well into the 1960s alongside dances like "The Twist" and "The Mashed Potato". The first Canadian-made and produced rock recording to achieve international popularity was "Clap Your Hands" in 1960 by a Montreal quartet, The Beaumarks. Shortly thereafter, they appeared on American Bandstand and a charity concert at Carnegie Hall. Bobby Curtola from Port Arthur, Ontario had several songs on the Canadian music charts beginning with "Hand In Hand With You" in 1960. His biggest chart-topper came in 1962 with the song "Fortune Teller", which was also successful internationally. In 1966, he won an RPM Gold Leaf Award (The Gold Leaf Awards, which were in effect the first Juno Awards) for being the first Canadian to have a gold album. The CHUM Chart debuted on May 27, 1957, under the name CHUM's Weekly Hit Parade, to 1986, and was the longest-running Top 40 chart in Canada.

During the 1960s, Canadian music was regarded with indifference and Canadian recording artists were forced to turn toward the United States to establish their careers. In 1960 Walt Grealis of Toronto started in the music business with Apex Records, the Ontario distributor for Compo Company (founded in 1918), Canada's first independent record company that today is part of Universal. He later joined London Records, where he worked until February 1964, when he then established RPM weekly trade magazine. From the first issue of RPM Weekly on February 24, 1964, to its final issue on November 13, 2000, RPM was the defining charts in Canada. The popularity of US rock on the two Canadian charts led to many existing groups, especially those devoted to country music, to change styles or to incorporate some rock style hits in their repertoires.

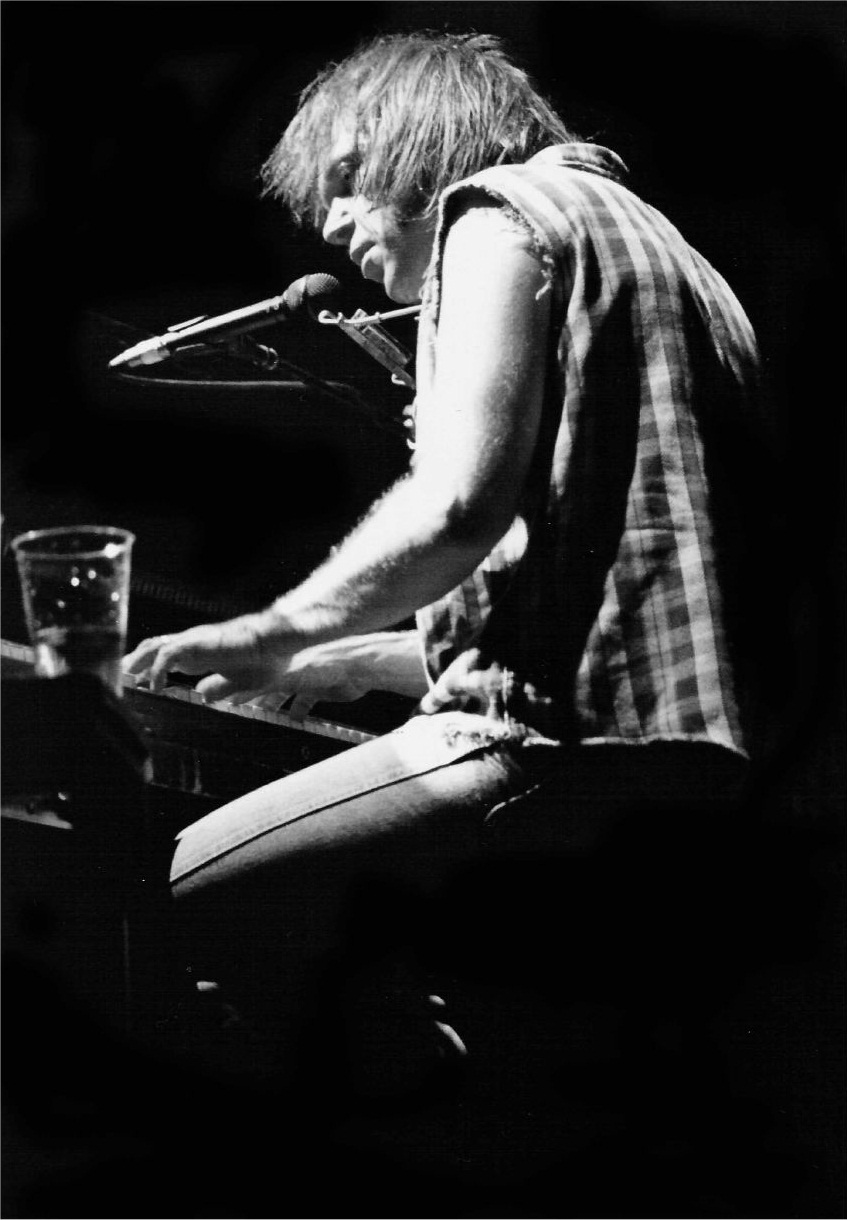
Neil Young

Country rock and folk rock singers such as Gordon Lightfoot, Joni Mitchell, Leonard Cohen, Denny Doherty (of The Mamas & the Papas), David Clayton-Thomas (of Blood, Sweat & Tears), Andy Kim, Zal Yanovsky (of The Lovin' Spoonful), John Kay (of Steppenwolf), and Ian & Sylvia found international audiences. One important example was a Winnipeg band called Chad Allan & the Expressions, which had a 1965 hit with a version of Johnny Kidd and the Pirates' "Shakin' All Over". They would eventually evolve into The Guess Who, the first Canadian rock group to have a No.1 hit that reached the top on the Canadian Singles Chart and the Billboard Hot 100 at the same time, with "American Woman" in 1970. Their success paved the way for a new wave of Canadian singer-songwriters, including Stan Rogers, Murray McLauchlan, Bruce Cockburn and Willie P. Bennett.

Unlike the generation before, the late sixties American and British counterculture and hippie movements had diverted rock towards psychedelic rock, heavy metal, progressive rock and many other styles, most dominated by socially and politically incisive lyrics. The music was an attempt to reflect upon the events of the time—civil rights, the growing unrest in America over the war in Vietnam, and the rise of feminism. In many instances, the "message" within the song was simplistic or banal. Although only two of the five original members of Steppenwolf were born in Canada (Jerry Edmonton and Goldy McJohn), the band was among the biggest in Canadian music in the 1960s and 1970s. German born frontman, John Kay, would later become a Canadian citizen and was the only member of Steppenwolf to be inducted into the Canadian Music Hall of Fame and Canada's Walk of Fame. Steppenwolf is most famous for the songs "Born to Be Wild", "Magic Carpet Ride" and "The Pusher". "Born to be Wild" is the group's biggest hit, making it to No. 2 on the Billboard Hot 100 in 1968, becoming one of the 500 Songs that Shaped Rock and Roll by the Rock and Roll Hall of Fame, and becoming one of Rolling Stone's 500 Greatest Songs of All Time. In 1969, drummer Corky Laing, from Montreal, joined pioneering American hard rock band Mountain. Another one of the most prominent players of the late 1960s and early 1970s rock scene was Neil Young, who was a member of the folk rock band Buffalo Springfield, before joining Crosby, Stills, Nash & Young. Young also recorded music with Crazy Horse throughout his solo career. The song "Ohio", written by Neil Young and recorded with CSNY, was in response to political events of the time and has since become an America social icon of the period. "Ohio" was written about the death of four students at Kent State University. The students were shot by Ohio National Guardsmen during an anti-war protest on the campus in May 1970.

=== 1970s ===
With the introduction of the Canadian Radio-television and Telecommunications Commission's (CRTC) broadcast regulations in 1970, the Canadian recording industry made rock a major focus of its activity. In 1971, the Canadian content law was passed ensuring Canadian artists weren't overrun by American media outlets. The Juno Awards began as a reader poll conducted by Canadian music industry trade magazine RPM Weekly in December 1964. A similar balloting process continued until 1970 when the RPM Gold Leaf Awards, as they were then known, were changed to the Juno Awards. The first Juno Award ceremony was held in 1975 and played a role in addressing the concern about Canadian content. This led to increased production and with the international popularity of The Guess Who and Neil Young at the end of the 1960s, opened markets outside Canada to the country's musicians. Success abroad usually ensured success in Canada. The early 1970s were a golden age for Canadian music. Many performers from the late 1960s came to the forefront in the following years, among them The Bells and Andy Kim from Montreal, Chilliwack from Vancouver, Five Man Electrical Band from Ottawa, Lighthouse from Toronto, Wednesday from Oshawa, and The Stampeders from Calgary.

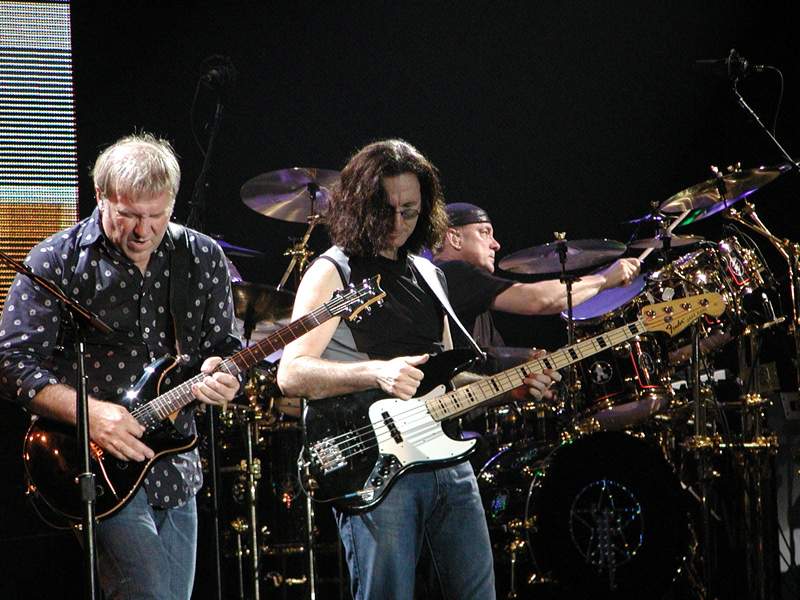
Rush in concert in Milan, Italy, 2004

With the introduction in the mid-1970s period of rock music on FM radio stations, where it was common practice to program extended performances, musicians were no longer limited to songs of three minutes' duration as dictated by AM stations. The still nascent Canadian music industry had little independent music media and a limited distribution infrastructure. Two internationally renowned bands to arise from this industry were Bachman–Turner Overdrive and Rush, both featuring acclaimed managers. Bachman–Turner Overdrive's manager, Bruce Allen, went on to produce Loverboy and eventually manage such major pop stars as Bryan Adams and Anne Murray. Randy Bachman (formerly of The Guess Who) released his new band's first album under the name Bachman–Turner Overdrive in spring 1973, which won two Juno Awards despite being largely ignored in the US. Their second album Bachman–Turner Overdrive II hit No. 4 in the U.S. BTO II was certified gold in eight countries. It also yielded their best-remembered and most enduring single, "Takin' Care of Business", written by Randy Bachman. 1974's album Not Fragile went straight to the top of the charts, and the single "You Ain't Seen Nothing Yet" hit No. 1 in the U.S. and No. 2 in the UK. One of the largest exports to date is Rush, that boasts 25 gold records and 14 platinum (3 multi-platinum) records, making them one of the best-selling rock bands in history by 2005. Rush currently place third behind The Beatles and The Rolling Stones for the most consecutive gold and platinum albums by a rock band.

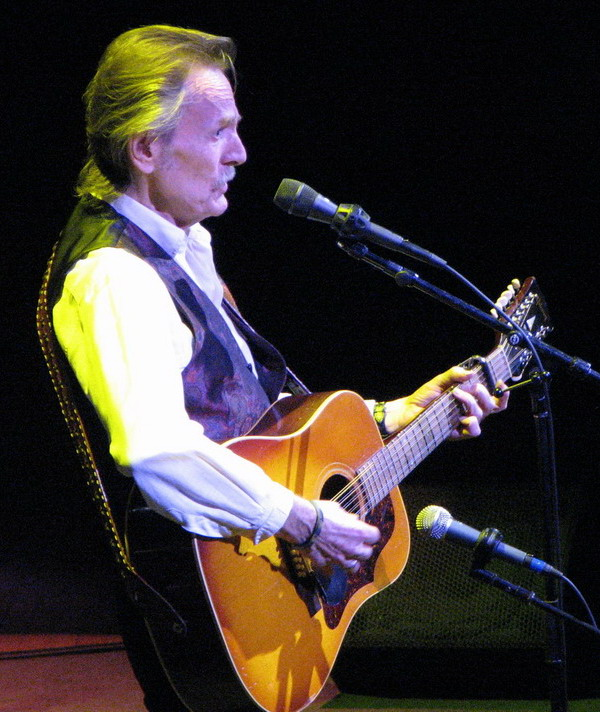
Gordon Lightfoot at Massey Hall 2008

Following the hard rock scene a small wave of acts emerged from all across Canada, including Moxy, A Foot in Coldwater and Triumph from Toronto, Trooper from Vancouver, and April Wine from Halifax. April Wine experienced massive success in Canada from the early-1970s to the mid-1980s, but also had some success in United States and Britain, though many music critics have felt their music has been overshadowed by more successful bands. Canadian cultural critics have noted that the late 1970s were a lesser era for Canadian music. Many of the acts who had defined the earlier half of the decade were no longer recording, and the new artists emerging in this era simply didn't seem to be able to capture the Canadian pop zeitgeist in the same way. Nevertheless, a number of established Canadian acts, including Rush, Bachman–Turner Overdrive, Frank Marino & Mahogany Rush, Bruce Cockburn, April Wine, Pat Travers, FM, and Neil Young, remained influential and recorded some of their most popular material of all during this period, and former "The Guess Who" lead singer Burton Cummings emerged as a popular solo artist in soft rock. Also notable is folk rocker Gordon Lightfoot's "The Wreck of the Edmund Fitzgerald", a song written in commemoration of the sinking of the bulk carrier SS Edmund Fitzgerald on Lake Superior on 10 November 1975. The incident is the most famous disaster in the history of Great Lakes shipping. The single reached #2 on the Billboard pop charts in November 1976, making it Lightfoot's second most successful (in terms of chart position) single, with "Sundown" having reached number one in 1974. Another of this period's most influential and popular rock bands, Heart, resulted from the collaboration of two sisters from Seattle with a supporting band from Vancouver. Some popular francophone bands of the time included the rock group Beau Dommage from Montreal led by Michel Rivard and the progressive rock group Harmonium also of Montreal. Artists like The Kings, Prism, Crowbar, Nick Gilder, Ian Thomas, Goddo, Harlequin, Mahogany Rush, Moxy, Streetheart, Max Webster and Ironhorse saw their greatest success during the late '70s period.

Many acts have had equally vital, if less remunerative careers outside the mainstream in punk rock and its derivations, generally distinguished by a tendency to extremes of one sort or another. Whether in instrumental intensity, lyric content, or performance style Canadian pop music evolved with the times, reflecting worldwide trends. In the late 1970s, as punk rock, disco, and the emerging new wave ruled the landscape, Canadian groups such as D.O.A., The Viletones, The Forgotten Rebels, Rough Trade, Diodes, Teenage Head, The Demics, The Young Canadians and Subhumans emerged and continued in the 1980s with popular bands like SNFU, Dayglo Abortions and Nomeansno. Rough Trade were particularly notable for their 1980 hit "High School Confidential", one of the first explicitly lesbian-themed pop songs to crack the Top 40 anywhere in the world.

=== 1980s ===
Things changed course in the 1980s, the changing fast-paced culture was accompanied by an explosion in youth culture. Until the mid-1960s, little attention was paid to rock by Canadian daily newspapers except as news or novelty. With the introduction during the 1970s of the "rock critic", coverage began to rival that of any other music. The 1980s saw Canada support and promote many of its own talent in pursuit of true originality. Canadian rock generally had been discouraged by market forces before the 1980s, in particular the need to conform to the taste of a Canadian audience that has had its standards and expectations formed by constant exposure to US and British acts for the prior three decades. The popularity of Chilliwack, for example, rose dramatically after the band turned from the experimental nature of its first few LPs to a mainstream pop style consistent with the US style. The band first hit the Top 10 charts in Canada with 1973s "Lonesome Mary", but are perhaps best remembered for three America hit songs from the 1980s "My Girl (Gone Gone Gone)", "I Believe" and "Whatcha Gonna Do". Even though those three hits were their only popular singles in the US, the band has released over a dozen albums with 23 Canadian hit singles. Bill Henderson, the founder of the band, was musical director for the Canadian edition of Sesame Street from 1989 to 1995. Henderson also acted as director of the Canadian Association of Recording Arts and Sciences (CARAS) and as president of the Songwriters Association of Canada (SOCAN).

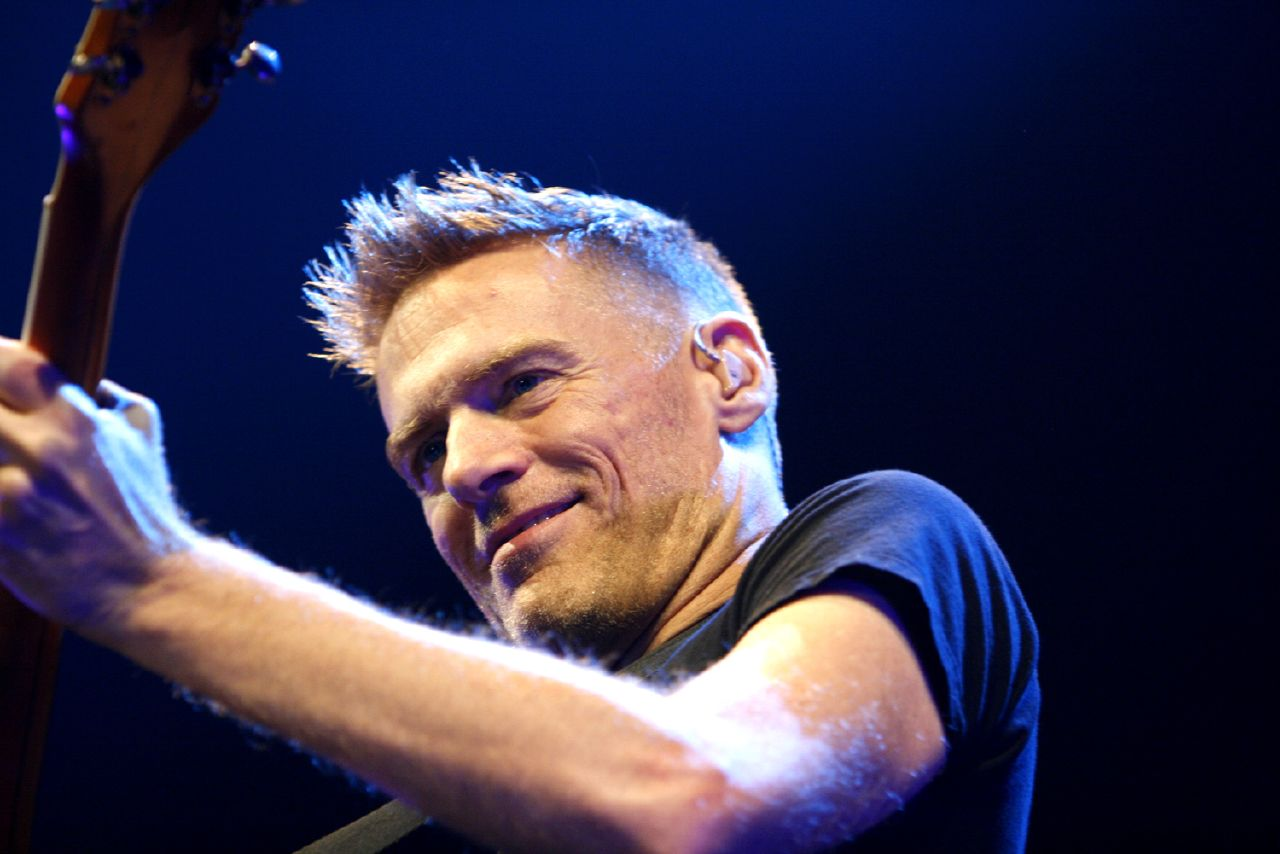
Bryan Adams, Hamburg, Germany 2007

Music videos assumed a major role in the promotion of pop rock recordings in 1980s for US exposure. Videos produced many mainstream pop-rockers that saw huge success in and outside of Canada. Success in the larger US market remained the major goal of most, if not all, post-1970 Canadian rock acts; a goal in fact reached with some greater or lesser degree of consistency by several, among them Bryan Adams, Kim Mitchell former guitarist and vocalist of Max Webster, Aldo Nova, Loverboy, Saga, k.d. lang, Red Rider, Corey Hart, Alannah Myles, Lee Aaron, Tom Cochrane, Honeymoon Suite, Haywire, Doug and the Slugs, Payola$ and Glass Tiger. As well, the era produced the country cowpunk of k.d. lang. Bryan Adams would emerge as Canada's superstar of the 1980s having been awarded the Order of Canada, and the Order of British Columbia and inducted into Canada's Walk of Fame in 1998 for his contribution to popular music and his philanthropic work. Also notable is Loverboy who accumulated numerous hit songs in Canada and the United States, making four multi-platinum albums. The band's hit singles, particularly "Lovin' Every Minute of It" and "Working for the Weekend" have become hard rock staples, and are still heard on classic rock radio stations across the US and Canada. Loverboy received five Juno Awards, Canada's highest award for music, in one year, a record that still stands today. The band would later receive an additional three Juno Awards, bringing their total to eight, which at that time was most received by a single group or individual aside from Bryan Adams.

Music videos became more and more important as a marketing tool for Canadian bands by the mid-1980s with the debut of MuchMusic in 1984 and MusiquePlus in 1986. Now both English and French Canadian musicians had outlets to promote their music through video in Canada. The networks were not just an opportunity for artists to get their videos played—the networks created VideoFACT, a fund to help emerging artists produce their videos. New wave, glam rock and heavy metal had become the most popular style of rock in the mid-1980s. Acts such as Platinum Blonde, Helix, Toronto, Parachute Club, The Box, Strange Advance, Spoons, Trans-X, Rational Youth, Men Without Hats, Norman Iceberg, Images in Vogue, Headpins, Sheriff, Frozen Ghost, Teenage Head, Idle Eyes, Eight Seconds, The Northern Pikes, Brighton Rock and Martha and the Muffins were along for the new Canadian music video ride. Although many of them, in fact, were only "one-hit wonders".

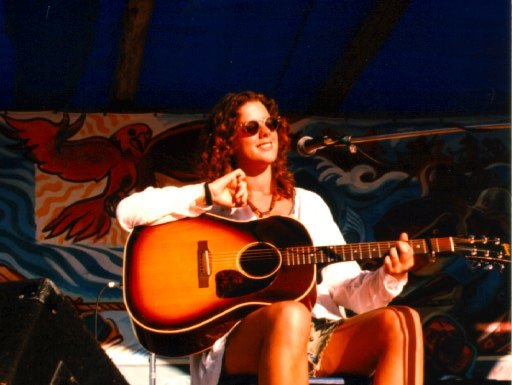
Sarah McLachlan at a 1993 benefit for Clayoquot Sound

In the late 1980s, the Canadian recording industry continued to produce popular acts such as Blue Rodeo. Alternative rock also emerged as an influential genre, with independent artists such as The Tragically Hip, 54-40, Sarah McLachlan, Spirit of the West, The Waltons, Cowboy Junkies, The Pursuit of Happiness, and The Grapes of Wrath all gaining their first widespread attention during this time. Also a new wave of Canadian thrash metal bands began to rise up and earned a dedicated following like Anvil, Razor, Voivod, Sacrifice, Sword, Exciter and Annihilator, Canadian metal's biggest selling artist, with sales of close to 2 million units worldwide, with industrial bands Skinny Puppy and Front Line Assembly in the mix, as well as black/death metal band Blasphemy.

Canada's most successful rock artists by the late 1980s worked in a relatively generic, mainstream pop rock style of the day. Some from the 1970s, 1980s and 1990s, may be ascribed to more specific substyles like Colin James, David Wilcox and Jeff Healey to blues-rock (see Canadian blues). With Stompin' Tom Connors, Great Big Sea and Ashley MacIsaac to folk rock, that saw the start for both styles, a very large following all across Canada. Most notable would be Stompin' Tom Connors who typically wrote about Canadian lore and history, some of Connors' better-known songs include Big Joe Mufferaw, The Black Donnellys, Reesor Crossing Tragedy, Sudbury Saturday Night and The Hockey Song (aka "The Good Old Hockey Game"), that is frequently played over sound systems at National Hockey League (NHL) games in both Canada and the United States.

=== 1990s ===
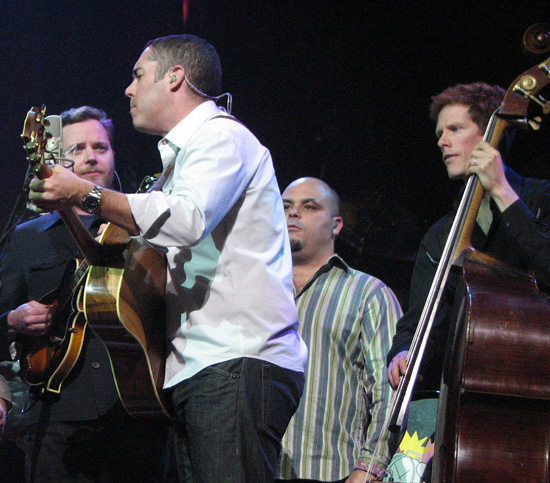
Barenaked Ladies at Massey Hall 2008.

At the start of the 1990s, Canadian rock took a distinctive turn. Just as artists from the 1970s competed with disco, artists from the 1990s were competing with Canadian hip hop and American hip hop on the Video and Radio charts. Glam metal and arena rock had lost its position as Hip hop, alternative rock and grunge became the new sound of the next generation. Canadian publications devoted to Canadian rock and pop music, either exclusively or in tandem with more general editorial content directed to young readers, was expanding rapidly in the 1990s. It was a decade of incredible nationalism, at least as far as English-Canadian music was concerned. The 1971 CRTC rules (25% Canadian content on Canadian radio, increased to 30% in the 1980s) finally came into full effect and by the end of the decade, radio stations would have to play 35% Canadian content. This led to an explosion of Canadian bands ruling the Canadian airwaves unlike any era before. This includes The Headstones, The Tea Party, Matthew Good Band, Moist, Sloan, The Gandharvas, Change of Heart, Skydiggers, Eric's Trip, Limblifter, Salmonblaster, supergarage, The Misunderstood, Shyne Factory, Doughboys, Crash Test Dummies, The Lowest of the Low, 13 Engines, Odds, I Mother Earth, Big Sugar, Glueleg, Age of Electric, Rymes with Orange, Mudgirl, Strapping Young Lad, Bif Naked, Rheostatics, The Watchmen, Moxy Früvous, Rusty, Our Lady Peace, The Philosopher Kings, Junkhouse, Wide Mouth Mason, Pure, Thrush Hermit, cub, The Killjoys, Sandbox, Treble Charger, Big Wreck, The Weakerthans, Propagandhi and The Planet Smashers. Although many of them have not been overly successful in the United States, they remain extremely popular in Canada having much more vitality than their contemporaries from other countries.

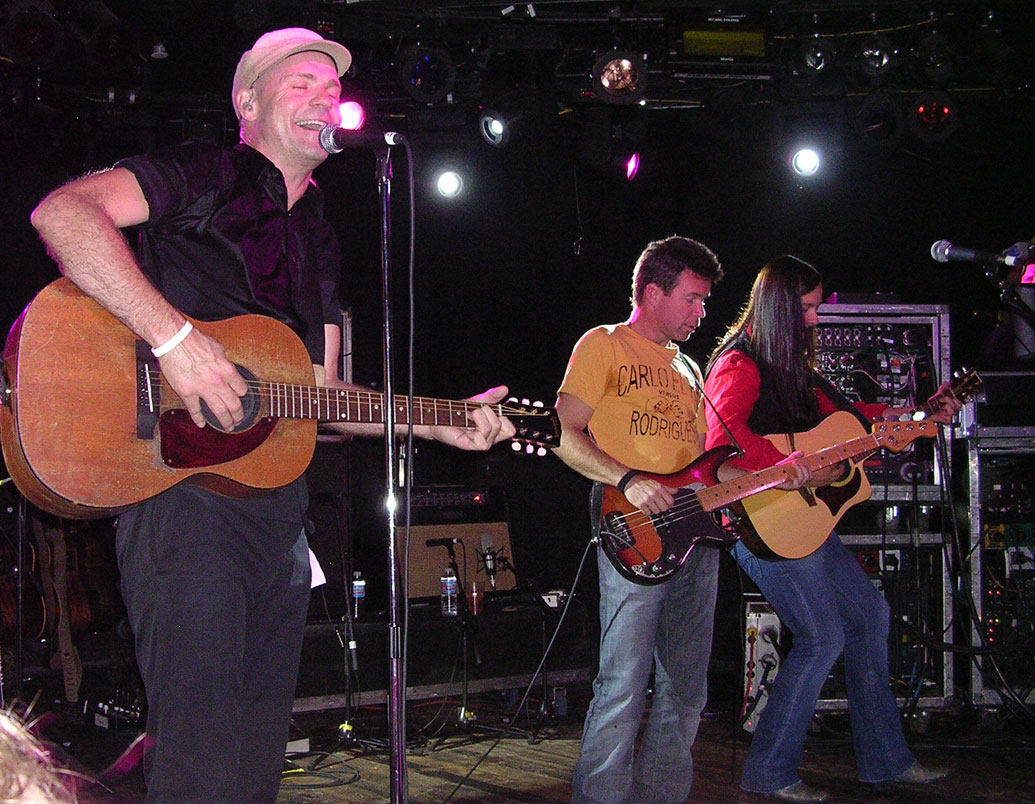
The Tragically Hip performing in Aspen, Colorado, United States, 2007

The Barenaked Ladies brought a spotlight on to the Canadian indie market when their album sales began to steamroll based simply on word of mouth and their live shows. The Yellow Tape, released in 1991, became the first indie release by any band to achieve platinum status (100,000 copies) in Canada. The album Stunt became their greatest success, buoyed by "One Week", which coincidentally spent one week at the number one spot on the storied Billboard Hot 100. The Tragically Hip are also noteworthy; the band had signed a long-term record deal with MCA in 1987, but were largely unrecognized until the release of Up to Here in 1989. The Hip went on to establish themselves as one of the most influential bands in Canada. They never had a major breakthrough in the United States, but their Canadian fan base alone was enough to sustain a long and healthy career featuring continuing stadium tours. The Hip achieved a record for most number one debuts on the Canadian Albums Chart with a total of eight albums. They were inducted into the Canadian Music Hall of Fame, Canada's Walk of Fame, Royal Conservatory of Music, have won over a dozen Juno Awards from more than thirty nominations, Our Lady Peace, from Toronto were one of the most successful Canadian rock groups of the 1990s; their 1997 effort Clumsy was certified Diamond in Canada and going Platinum in the U.S., which was an uncommon feat for Canadian rock groups at that time.

In 1996, VideoFACT launched PromoFACT, a funding program to help new artists produce electronic press kits and websites. This helped Indie rock, that would see a new dominant phase in the mid-1990s just as rock and roll was starting to be a predominant force in the Canadian charts once again. Indie rock was never supposed to be mainstream, but this is the path it took by the end of the decade. Musically, the late 1990s saw the rock genres of the early 1990s completely grow apart rather than fuse. Each of the genres multiplied and evolved in a fashion largely independent of the others. Perhaps the most dramatic change in lifestyle affected the girls. They were the daughters of the women who had fought for emancipation and equality in the 1960s.

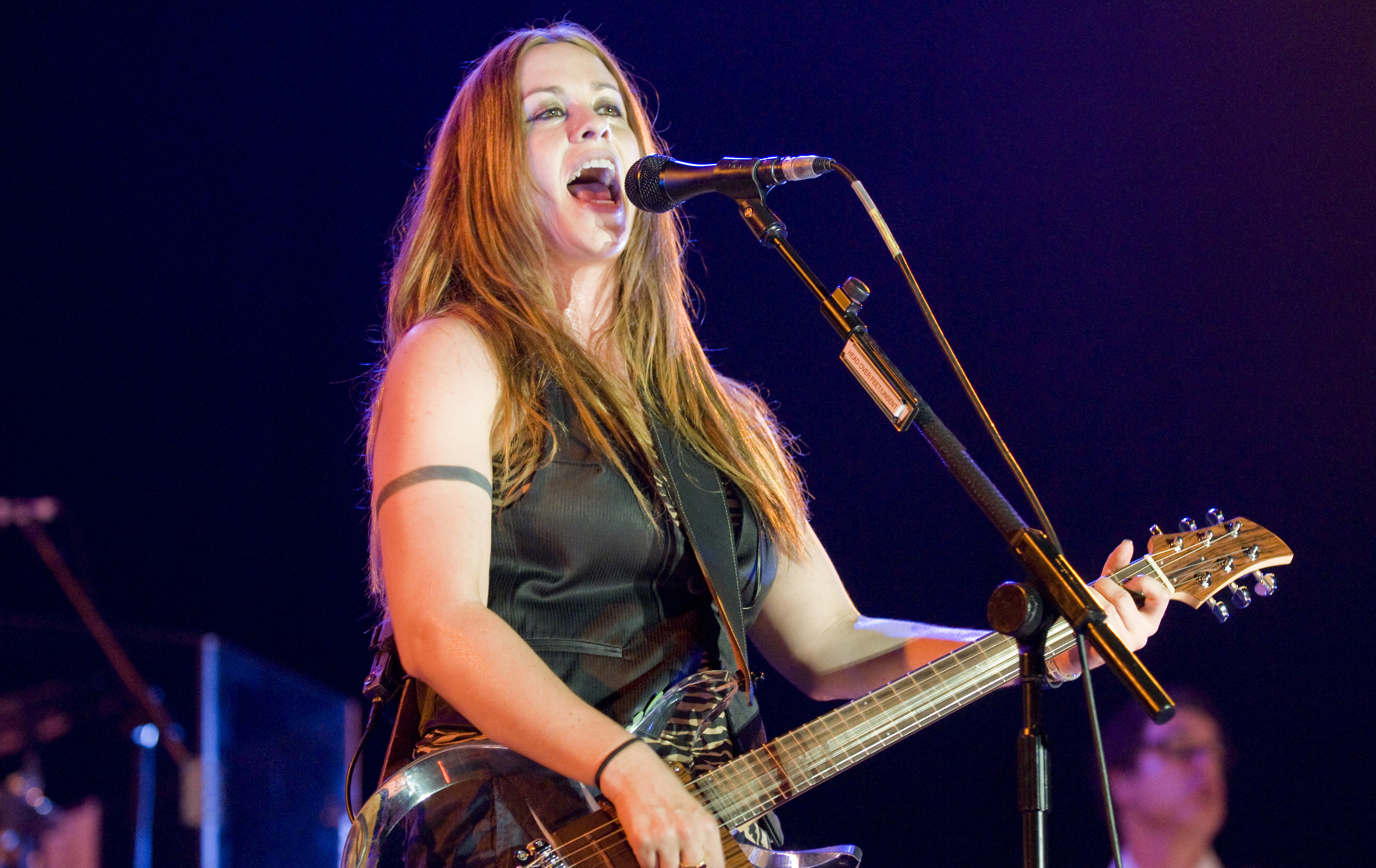
Alanis Morissette, in the Espacio Movistar, Barcelona, 2008.

Canadian women by the end of the decade enjoyed greater international commercial success than ever before in the popular music field. As Alannah Myles, Lisa Dalbello and Lee Aaron had a decade earlier, four women in particular rose out of the 1990s, setting new pinnacles of success in terms financial, critical, and in their immediate and strong influences on their respective genres: Sarah McLachlan, Céline Dion, Alanis Morissette and Shania Twain. Alanis Morissette kicked off another revolution in Canadian music, launching an era in which Canadian women like Avril Lavigne would rule the pop charts worldwide. Quebec-born singer Celine Dion is the best-selling Canadian artist of all time; when her 1997 album Let's Talk About Love was released in Canada, it broke the record for the highest opening weekly sales for any album, selling 230,212 copies, a record which still stands. Alanis Morissette, along with Shania Twain, are the only Canadian artists, male or female to have sold two million units in Canada, receiving the Double diamond award Other female Canadian musicians have achieved international success in the highly competitive world of popular music, including Joni Mitchell, Ginette Reno, Diane Dufresne, Diana Krall, Avril Lavigne, Loreena McKennitt, Amanda Marshall, Holly Cole, Chantal Kreviazuk, Diane Tell, Jann Arden, Deborah Cox, Sarah Harmer, Susan Aglukark, Melissa Auf der Maur, Emily Haines, Kittie, Bif Naked, Nelly Furtado, Colleen Rennison and Feist.

=== 2000s ===
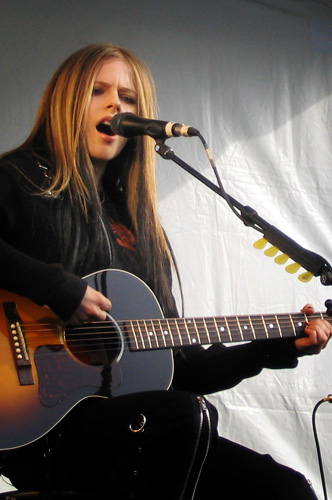
Avril Lavigne in Burnaby during her promotional tour for Under My Skin in 2004

The early first decade of the 21st century was dominated by post-grunge and continued to see the expansion of alternative rock, pop-punk, hard rock, and indie rock both artistically and commercially. The main musical phenomenon was the emergence of a new generation of singer songwriters that were the direct consequence of the previous generation's intellectual ambitions. The biggest factor that has contributed to the resurgence of rock music in the first decade of the 21st century is the rise of paid digital downloads. The vast majority of songs bought on paid download sites are singles bought from full albums; songs that are bought on a song-by-song basis off artist's albums are considered sales of singles, even though they have no official single for purchase. The boom of independent music at the turn of the millennium changed the dynamics of the music industry. At about the same time, the CD (cheap to manufacture) replaced the vinyl album and cassette tapes (expensive to manufacture). Shortly thereafter, the Internet allowed musicians to directly distribute their music, thus bypassing the selection of the old-fashioned "record label". Canada's music industry has suffered as a result of the challenging times for the better part of the last decade. Canada joined 50 other nations in 2008 to update its Copyright Act, and in doing so aimed to allow artists and others to seek compensation for their work, no matter how it is distributed. In 2010 Canada introduced new copyright legislation. The amended law makes hacking digital locks illegal, but enshrine into law the ability of purchasers to record and copy music from a CD to portable devices.

Canadian rock acts active during the 21st century include The Glorious Sons, Mother Mother, Arkells, Devin Townsend, Strapping Young Lad, Billy Talent, Silverstein, Thornley, Sam Roberts, Joel Plaskett, Avril Lavigne, Cleopatrick, Finger Eleven, Simple Plan, Marianas Trench, Gob, Hot Hot Heat, Immaculate Machine, The New Pornographers, Sum 41, Evans Blue, Parabelle, Three Days Grace, The Trews, Matt Mays & El Torpedo, Alexisonfire, Theory of a Deadman, Protest the Hero, Default, Bedouin Soundclash, Neverending White Lights, Hedley, Tokyo Police Club, Death from Above 1979, Age of Daze, Metric, Broken Social Scene, Monster Truck, The Sheepdogs, Walk Off the Earth, City and Colour, No Sinner, Priestess and PUP.

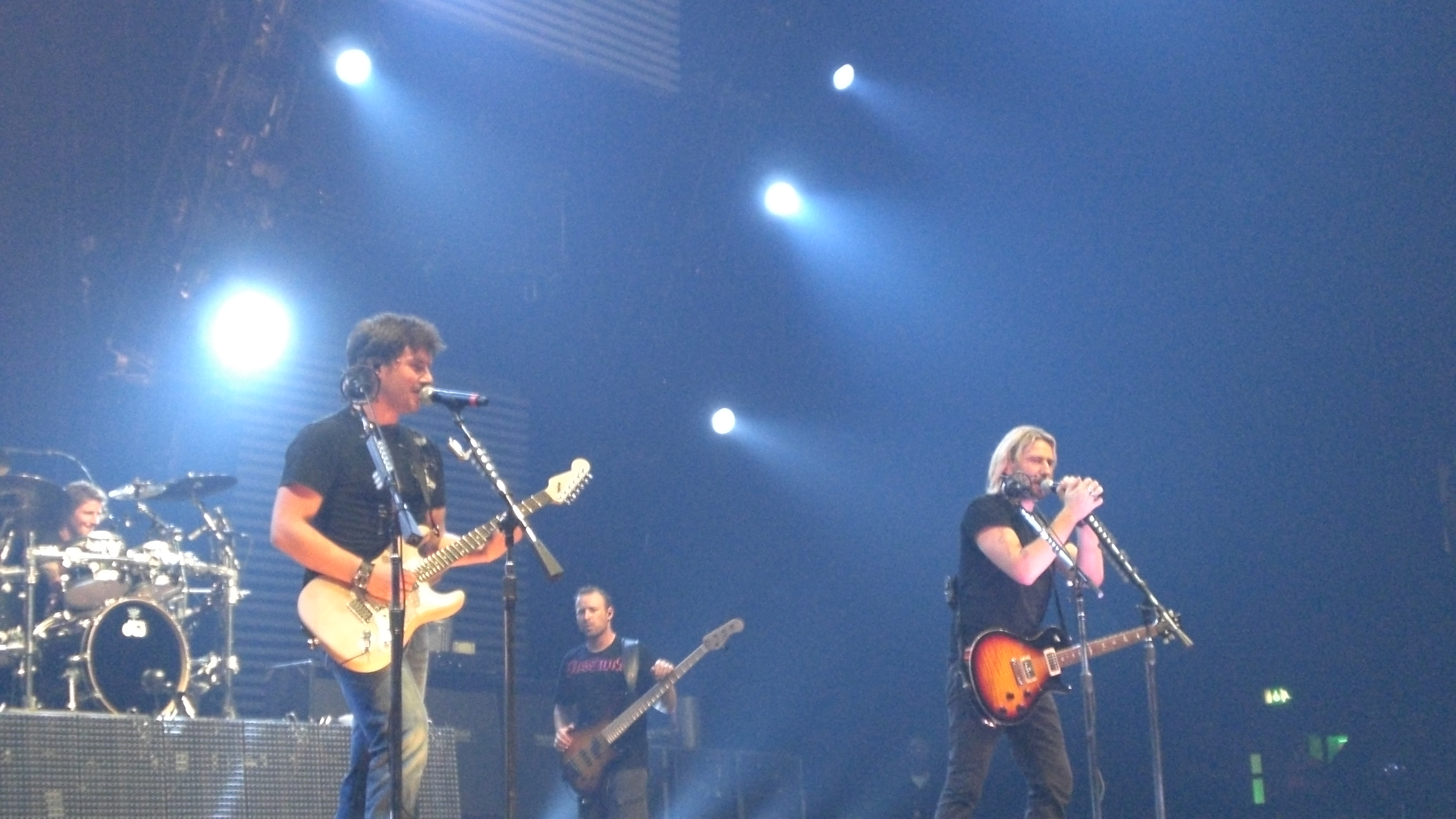
Nickelback at Wembley Stadium, London, 2008

Arguably the most successful Canadian group of the decade was Nickelback. The album Silver Side Up sold over six million copies (6× Platinum) in the United States and 800,000 copies (8× Platinum) in Canada. The band has won multiple Juno Awards, an American Music Award, and a MTV Video Music Award Their hit single "How You Remind Me" reached the top on the Canadian Singles Chart and the Billboard Hot 100 at the same time, making them the second Canadian band to accomplish this, the first being The Guess Who with "American Woman" in 1970. Nickelback has also sold over 50 million albums worldwide, making them the only Canadian rock band to achieve this. Also very notable is Avril Lavigne, who is one of the top-selling artists releasing albums in the United States, with over 10.25 million copies certified by the Recording Industry Association of America.

The end of the decade was notable for a surprising number of ambitious indie rock albums. The Canadian indie rock scene has been the focus of national and international attention in many publications, such as Spin, The New York Times Magazine, Rolling Stone, Under the Radar, as well the Canadian edition of Time magazine. It can be difficult for an indie group to break through in Canada as there is no nationwide rock station. On the other hand, although rock bands may get some exposure from outlets such as MuchMusic and CBC Radio 3, bands must largely rely on building an audience city by city, as each commercial radio station makes its playlist decisions independently. Similarly, it is more difficult to travel nationwide as well due to the vast size, creating regional communities that revolve around major music scenes in cities such as Winnipeg, Vancouver, Toronto, Montreal or Halifax, each with a handful of offshoot suburban town scenes that produce the next wave of fresh bands. Most notable is Arcade Fire, who have won numerous awards, including the 2011 Grammy for Album of the Year, the 2011 Juno Award for Album of the Year, and the 2011 Brit Award for Best International Album for their third studio album, The Suburbs.

== French ==
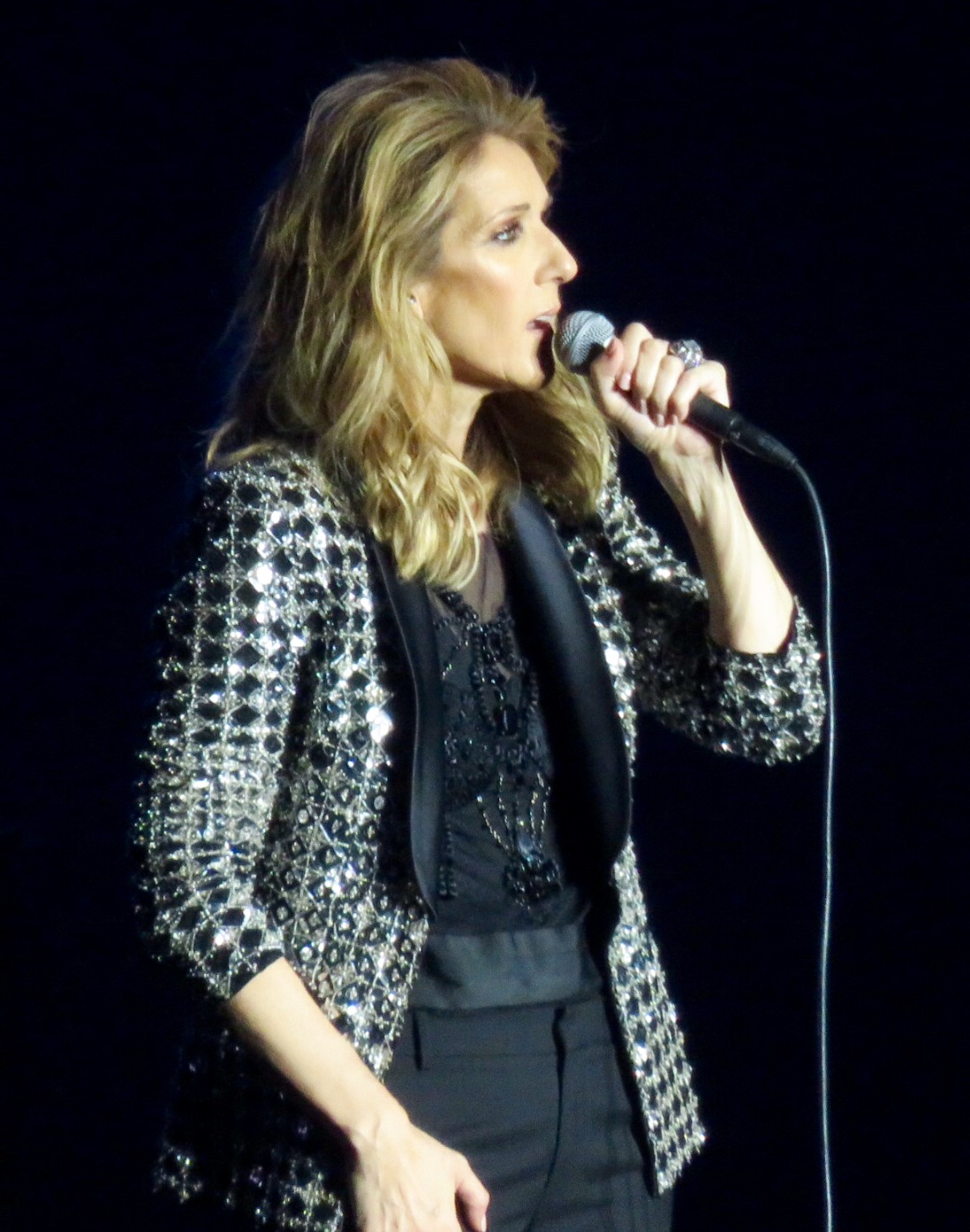
Céline Dion performing in Birmingham, England in 2017

In the 1960s, some French Canadians of Quebec were beginning to self-identify as Québécois (Quebecers). [See the Quiet Revolution.] The tensions between Quebec and English Canada have, at times, played out on Quebec's music scene as well. For example, in 1991, Céline Dion won the Félix award for Best Anglophone Artist for her English-language debut, Unison, but she refused the award as she did not view herself as an Anglophone artist. After the controversy caused by this incident, Dion has been careful not to clearly declare herself as either federalist or sovereignist.

Recent Quebec performers include Richard Desjardins, Daniel Boucher, Marie-Chantal Toupin, Éric Lapointe, Vilain Pingouin, Mes Aïeux, Les Trois Accords, Kaïn, Dumas, La Chicane, Les Colocs, Cindy Daniel, Daniel Bélanger, Paul Cargnello, Laurence Jalbert, Jean Leloup, Celine Dion, Les Stups, Dan Bigras, Isabelle Boulay and more recently Cœur de pirate. Some bands, such as Les Cowboys Fringants have known success in Europe (primarily in France) while Karkwa, Vulgaires Machins and Malajube are also recognized elsewhere in Canada. In 2003, TVA began to broadcast Star Académie, a Québécois version of a French reality music competition, several new artists including Marie-Élaine Thibert, Marie-Mai, Émily Bégin and Stéphanie Lapointe became better known among francophones after participation in the reality show. Charlotte Cardin, a finalist on TVA's singing competition La Voix in 2013, went on to critical and commercial success in pop and rock in French and English Canada.

Quebec has also produced a number of significant Anglophone artists, including Arcade Fire, Patrick Watson, The Dears, Godspeed You! Black Emperor, Riverbeds, Stars, The Stills, The Unicorns, Wolf Parade, Rufus Wainwright, Sam Roberts, Paul Cargnello, We Are Wolves, Corey Hart, Corky Laing, The New Cities, Chromeo, Simple Plan and the infamous spoken-word musical career of William Shatner. Quebec artists have dominated the long and short lists of the Polaris Music Prize. Among them, Arcade Fire, Patrick Watson, Godspeed You! Black Emperor and Karkwa have all won the award.

== See also ==
- Aboriginal rock
- Canadian patriotic music
- Canadian blues
- Canadian music genres
- Canadian Music Hall of Fame
- Canadian rock/alternative chart
- East Coast Music Association
- List of number-one singles in Canada
- Music of Canadian cultures
