= Georges Beauchemin =

Canadian singer and veterinarian (1891–1957)

Georges Beauchemin (June 17, 1891 – February 25, 1957) was a Canadian singer and veterinarian, who released records for both the Starr and Victor Talking Machine Company/RCA Victor recording companies, as well as two recordings under the pseudonym Roger Mainville for the Duprex company. Beauchemin was one of the first musicians from Quebec to have his music mass marketed.

== Career ==
Born in Nicolet, Quebec, Beauchemin began his professional life working as a veterinarian for the Government of Canada. He lived and worked in Winnipeg from 1922 to 1924, but moved to Montreal in 1924. While there, he began to perform on radio station CKAC, accompanied by his wife Marguerite Duval on the piano.

Beauchemin made his first recordings—two songs—in 1926, with the Starr recording company. He began recording songs for the Victor Talking Machine Company in 1928. Between 1928 and 1932, he recorded 45 songs under their label. These included both popular French songs and French versions of contemporary American songs. He was partial to the songs of Roméo Beaudry, who wrote fifteen of the songs Beauchemin recorded with the Victor Talking Machine Company.

In 1936 Beauchemin moved to Quebec City and abandoned his musical career to focus on his veterinary work. He died in Montreal in 1957.

== Recordings ==
=== 1926 ===
- 15293 Starr Side A: Au milieu de la nuit by Beaudry, Rose and Donaldson (Baritone with piano) (2:52) Side B: Bonjour, l'amour by Beaudry, Dixon and Henderson (performed by Jacques Fournier)

=== 1928 ===
- 263510 Victor Talking Machine Company Side A: Y-a des loups by Quentin and de Buxeuil (Baritone with piano) (3:19) Side B: À dame jolie by Favart and Codini (Baritone with piano) (2:48)
- 263512 Victor Talking Machine Company Side A: Un coin de ciel bleu by Beaudry and Donaldson (Baritone with piano and violin) (3:14) Side B: Prends garde Lisette by Fortin and de Buxeuil (Baritone with piano) (3:29)
- 263516 Victor Talking Machine Company Side A: À l'ombre des lilas by Beaudry and Donaldson (Baritone with piano) (2:47) Side B: C'est votre mère by Beaudry and Burke (Sung by Laurent Michel)
- 263518 Victor Talking Machine Company Side A: Tsin-tsa-no by Gold and Fragerolle (Baritone with piano) (2:55) Side B: On n'sait pas by Charles, Koger, Scotto and Mele (Baritone with piano) (2:48)
- 263526 Victor Talking Machine Company Side A: Ramona (Baritone with piano and violin) (3:17) Side B: Mademoiselle Mimi by Beaudry and Wayne (Baritone with piano and violin) (2:43)
- 263532 Victor Talking Machine Company Side A: Fleurette by Dupil and Gamache (Baritone with piano and violin) (3:14) Side B: Pourquoi me faire pleurer? by Deyglun and Carbonneau (Baritone with piano and violin) (3:05)
- 263535 Victor Talking Machine Company Side A: La belle de Sigma Chi by Poirier and Vernor (Baritone with piano and violin) (3:29) Side B: Vivre seul by Poirier and Sizemore (Baritone with violin and piano) (2:56)
- 263545 Victor Talking Machine Company Side A: Chiquita by Morrissette and Wayne (Baritone with piano, violin and cello) (3:32) Side B: Reviens à moi by Deyglun and Payette (Baritone with piano) (3:25)
- 263558 Victor Talking Machine Company Side A: Jeannine au temps des lilas by Beaudry and Shilkret (Baritone with violin, cello and piano) (3:20) Side B: Berceuse tendre : il fait si bon près de toi by Daniderff, Ronn and Daniderff (Baritone with violin, cello and piano) (3:26)

=== 1929 ===
- 263566 RCA Victor Side A: J'ai trouvé l'amour by Beaudry and Friend (Baritone with piano) (3:04) Side B: Lenora by Beaudry and Riesenfeld (Baritone with piano) (3:12)
- 263574 RCA Victor Side A: Cher enfant by Poirier, de Sylva, Brown and Henderson (Baritone with cello, violin and piano) (3:01) Side B: Dis-moi que tu pardonnes by Beaudry and Fiorito (Baritone with piano) (2:55)
- 263583 RCA Victor Side A: Au sommet du monde by Beaudry and Whiting (Baritone with violin, cello and piano) (3:14) Side B: Et moi by Poirier and Berlin (Baritone with violin, cello and piano) (3:01)
- 263591 RCA Victor Side A: Les yeux de maman by Beaudry and Baer (Baritone with cello, violin and piano) (3:02) Side B: Bonjour mon bel oiseau by Beaudry and Friend (Baritone with cello, violin and piano) (3:18)
- 263596 RCA Victor Side A: Mon Angéline by Beaudry, Gilbert and Wayne (Baritone with violin, cello and piano) (3:30) Side B: Mon château d'Espagne by Beaudry, Caesar and Friend (Baritone with violin, cello and piano) (2:59)
- 263607 RCA Victor Side A: Un gentil rien qui s'appelle l'amour by Davis and Coots (Baritone with orchestra) (3:15) Side B: Un baiser sur vos mains, Madame by Rotter and Erwin (Baritone with orchestra) (3:22)
- 263608 RCA Victor Side A: Coucou by Deyglun and Jonasson (Baritone with orchestra) (2:47) Side B: Les filles de La Rochelle by Tiersot (Baritone with orchestra) (2:58)
- 263617 RCA Victor Side A: Mariez-vous donc by Gitrall and Scotto (Baritone with piano) (3:01) Side B: Les ciseaux by Fragerolle and Missa (Baritone with piano) (3:02)

=== 1930 ===
- 263658 RCA Victor Side A: Mon chant du Nil by Deyglun and Meyer (Baritone with orchestra) (3:18) Side B: Le chant païen by Deyglun and Brown (Baritone with orchestra) (2:47)
- 263668 RCA Victor Side A: Trois petits garçons by Urgel (Baritone with piano) (2:46) Side B: Le couteau by Botrel (Baritone with piano) (2:14)
- 263759 RCA Victor Side A: Mon coeur by Willemetz, St-Granier, Le Seyeux and Christiné (Baritone with piano) (3:15) Side B: Raymonde by Mirande, Willemetz and Moretti (Baritone with piano) (2:45)

=== 1931 ===
- 263778 RCA Victor Side A: Marianina by Monti (Baritone with piano and violin) (3:04) Side B: L'hirondelle by Boyer and Milano Baritone with piano and violin) (3:16)

=== 1932 ===
- 263873 RCA Victor Side A: Je ne sais pas pourquoi by Turk, Ahlert and Nel (Popular song with piano) (3:20) Side B: Coupable by Kahn, Akst, Whiting and Nel (Popular song with piano) (3:27)
