= Dionysos (Canadian band) =

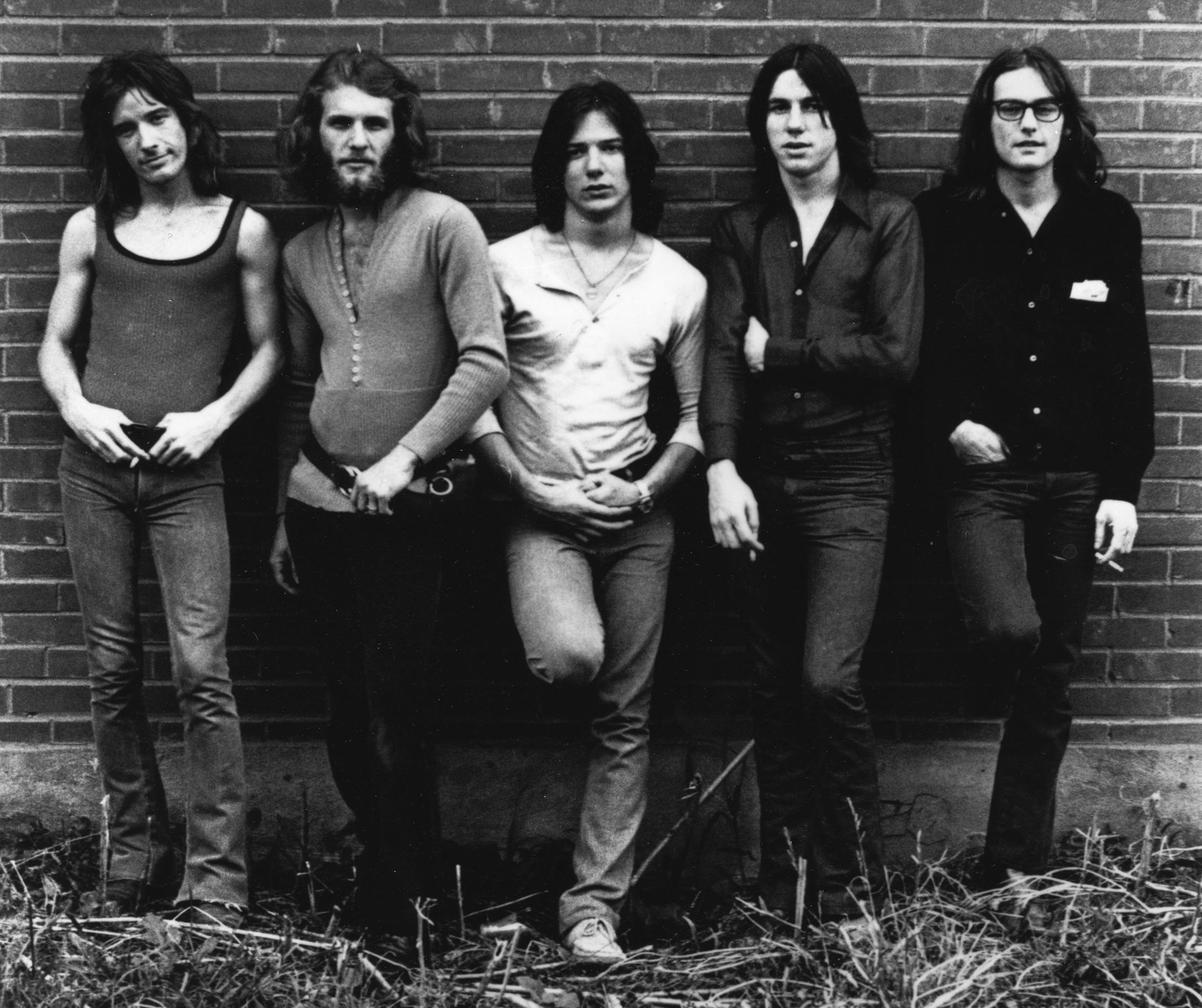
- Dionysos in 1969

Background information
- Origin: Salaberry-de-Valleyfield, Quebec, Canada
- Genres: Progressive rock
- Years active: 1969–1977
- Labels: Jupiter; Disques Vogue, Deram Records
- Past members: Phil Bech; Éric Clément; Fern Durand; Jean-Pierre Legault; Robert Lepage; André Mathieu; Paul-André Thibert; Clement Tremblay

Dionysos was a French Canadian progressive rock band based in Salaberry-de-Valleyfield, Quebec, Canada. The founding members were Paul-André Thibert (vocals, harmonica, flute), Éric Clément (guitars), Jean-Pierre Legault (bass), André Mathieu (keyboards) and Robert Lepage (drums). They had a hit with their 1970 single "Suzie". The band is also known for being the first rock band from Quebec to write and play music sung entirely in "joual", the slang-influenced dialect of Quebec itself, an important step in Quebec culture.

== History ==
In 1969, the members of the group composed the music for the play Simon neige, presented by the Cégep de Valleyfield theater troupe. Dionysos made a name for themselves during the summer of 1970 by playing at the Galerie Café du Vieux-Montréal. In January 1971, they released their first album, Le Grand Jeu, which was co-produced by singer Donald Lautrec. It was released under the Jupiter record label and sold 6,000 copies.

On June 13, 1971, Dionysos took part, representing Canada, in the Montreux Jazz Festival in Switzerland. The group's performance was a resounding success; the newspaper La Presse even compared singer Paul-André Thibert to Mick Jagger of the Rolling Stones. Following this event, the group performed regularly in Canada.

Their second album, Le Prince Croule, was released in November 1971 under the Zodiac record label. Following a conflict with Jean-Pierre Legault, Paul-André left the band for a short period, and his return to the lineup coincided with the arrival of the new bassist Fernand Durand.

In 1974, the Zodiac record company released Collection Dionysos, which turned out to be a compilation of the first two albums. In retaliation for the commercial failure of the album Le Prince Croule, this album still refused them the budget necessary for the production of their third album. Deprived of the prospect of releasing this new album, the group ceased all activity in April of the same year.

18 months later, in September 1976, Dionysos released their third album Changé d'adresse, an album they produced themselves thanks to an advance on royalties from a distribution contract got with the Deram record label. The group, then a sextet, separated definitively during the year 1977 after a last tour on the North Shore.

== Post-separation ==
Paul-André Thibert pursued a solo career, and in 1978 published a solo album entitled Musique de mes amis Dionysos. The album brings together former members of Dionysos: Éric Clément, Fernand Durand, André Mathieu, Jean-Pierre Forget, as well as other musicians such as Alain Paquette (guitar), Michel Lefrançois (guitar) who also orchestrated, arranged and produced the album, Richard Perotte (drums), Serge Réhaume (flute) and Robert Turmel (bass).

Dionysus made a comeback in 1994 with the release of Pionnier 1969–1994.

== Discography ==
=== Singles ===
- 1970: "Suzie"
- 1972: "J'ai Jamais"

=== Albums ===
==== Studio ====
- 1971: Le Grand jeu
- 1972: Le Prince Croule
- 1976: Dionysos (Changé d'addresse)
- 1978: Musique de mes amis Dionysos

==== Compilation ====
- 1974: Collection Dionysos
- 1994: Pionniers 1969–1994

== See also ==
- Music of Canada
- Canadian rock
- List of bands from Canada
