= Eugène Daignault =

American-Canadian multi-genre performer and artist

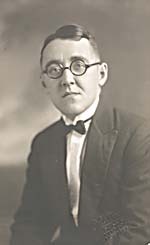
Eugène Daignault, circa 1926

Eugène Daignault (September 14, 1895 in Saint Albans, Vermont – January 27, 1960 in Montreal) was an American-Canadian performer, known for his music, his comedy, and his radio performances – in particular, on the Société Radio-Canada soap opera Un homme et son péché, where he portrayed "Pere Ovide" from 1949 to 1960.

His radio career began in 1922, with a performance on CKAC radio mere days after its launch.

In 1926, he signed a recording contract with the Canadian branch of Starr Records, for whom he recorded 93 songs, some of which were in collaboration with Mary Bolduc; He also recorded for Bluebird Records beginning in 1942.
