= Music of Quebec =

As a cosmopolitan province, Quebec is a home to various genres of music, ranging from folk to hip hop. Music has played an important role in Quebecer culture. In the 1920s and 1930s, singer/songwriter Madam Bolduc performed comedic songs in a folk style with Irish influences. Quebec's popular artists of the last century include Félix Leclerc (1950's), Gilles Vigneault (1960s–present), Kate and Anna McGarrigle (1970's–present) and Céline Dion (1980's–present).'

The First Nations and the Inuit of Quebec also have their own traditional music. A local variety of Celtic music can also be found there. Quebec also has many well-known jazz musicians and a culture of classical music, as well as a strong presence of historically informed performance of baroque and renaissance music.

The song À la claire fontaine was the anthem of the New France, Patriots and French Canadian before being replaced by O Canada. Currently, the song Gens du pays is preferred by many Quebecers to be the national anthem of Quebec. The Association Québécois de l'industrie du disque, du spectacle et de la vidéo (ADISQ) was created in 1978 to promote the music industry in Quebec. The Orchestre symphonique de Québec and the Montreal Symphony Orchestra are respectively

== Traditional music ==
When it was under French control, Québec was referred to as Le Canada. It was known as the advanced colony out of all the New France settlements. After some generations of French settlers being born in Canada, the colonists began to identify with their home country and call themselves les Canadiens (the Canadians) as distinct from les Français (the French), those native to France. The Canadiens brought with them a rich tradition of songs and dances from northern France, namely the regions of Île-de-France, Picardy, Normandy, Poitou, and Brittany. Influence from these regions and the Irish immigration to Quebec of the 19th century may explain the Celtic connection that Quebec still shares with Brittany, Ireland, Scotland and the Maritimes.

As time went by, the French Canadians began to develop their own music, and also incorporated and transformed the styles of music played by the settlers from Great Britain, in particular the Scots, after the Conquest. (One hundred of these songs were collected by Ernest Gagnon for an 1865 compilation, one of the first such collections to be published in Canada.)

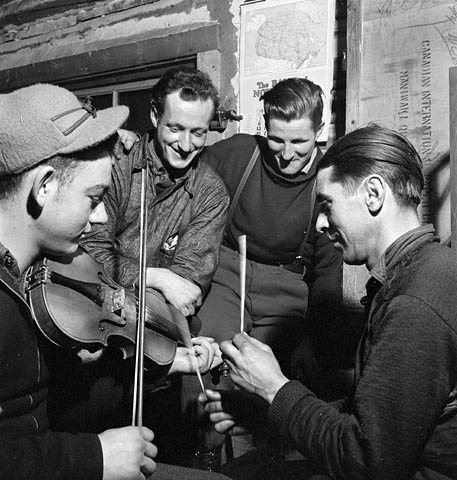
Québécois lumberjacks playing the fiddle, with sticks for percussion, in a lumber camp in 1943.

Traditional music is infused with many dances, such as the jig, the quadrille, the reel and line dancing, which have developed in the festivities since the early days of colonization. And in Quebec's culture, the following musical instruments are the most prominent: harmonica (music-of-mouth or lip-destruction), fiddle, spoons, jaw harp and accordion. Traditional Quebec music is characterized by podorythmie which means giving the rhythm with the feet, and is currently provided by various contemporary groups performing mostly during Christmas and New Year's Eve celebrations, the Quebec National Holiday and many local festivals.

== Popular music ==
Perhaps the phenomenon in the popular music of that century was the career of La Bolduc, who became extremely popular singing satirical and sometimes racy songs based on the Quebec and Irish folk traditions, and who also was expert in the wordless vocalization known as turlutte.

By the 1960s, radio and television had begun to help disseminate French folk songs, especially after the 1967 foundation of the Centennial Collection of Canadian Folk Songs, including recordings of Quebec performers like Yves Albert and Jacques Labrecque, as well as Acadian Edith Butler.

The popular songwriters and singers of this period were Gilles Vigneault, Leonard Cohen (attended McGill University, d.2016, buried in Montreal), and Félix Leclerc, who brought more influences to the music of France-based singing stars like Jacques Brel. Leclerc, from La Tuque, and Vigneault, from Natashquan in the north of Quebec, became heroes for a new generation of Quebec youth. It was Vigneault's "Mon pays" (My Country), which became a rallying anthem for Quebec nationalism after a 1965 performance by Monique Leyrac, and established a tradition of Quebec artists supporting Quebec's independence movement. Many artists openly endorsed it, notably Raymond Lévesque, Pauline Julien and Paul Piché.

In the 1960s, the French Canadians of Quebec were beginning to self-identify as Québécois (Quebecers). See the Quiet Revolution. Another important nationalist performer during this period was Georges Dor, who enjoyed international success with the recording of his own composition, "La complainte de la Manic" ("The Ballad of Manicouagan"); other popular singers of the time include Claude Gauthier and Clemence Desrochers. Popular artists of the 70s included Harmonium, Offenbach, Plume Latraverse, Garolou and Beau Dommage, as well as Michel Rivard.

Country music, in both French and English (primarily the former), is prevalent in Quebec. An aspect of the overall Canadian country scene, it is the chief source of francophone country, inclusive of artists such as Renée Martel, Gildor Roy, Patrick Norman, Willie Lamothe, and Georges Hamel.

Progressive rock and fusion jazz band Maneige was founded in Quebec in 1972 by Alain Bergeron and Jérôme Langlois. The band was one of the Quebec progressive rock scene's longest running and consistent bands. In 1974, Vigneault and Leclerc played on the Plains of Abraham with Robert Charlebois, who made heavy use of Quebec French in his rock and roll fusions. In 1976, multi-instrumentalist sisters Kate & Anna McGarrigle emerged on the international music scene with their blend of folk-rock and vocal harmonies added to self-penned songs in English and French, many of the latter co-written with Swiss-born poet Philippe Tatartcheff. The 1970s also saw roots performers like La Bottine Souriante gain critical and commercial acclaim within Quebec. Jim Corcoran and Bertrand Gosselin released La tête en gigue, an influential album that helped bring Quebec roots to crossover audiences across Canada, the United States and Europe. In addition to his musical career, Corcoran currently hosts a weekly show on CBC Radio One, which airs Francophone music from Quebec for English audiences across Canada. The early 1980s saw the formation of francophone synthpop/new wave groups such as Nudimension that became involved in the genesis of music video and MTV culture.

More recent Quebec performers include Richard Desjardins, Daniel Boucher, Marie-Chantal Toupin, Éric Lapointe, Vilain Pingouin, Mes Aïeux, Les Trois Accords, Kaïn, Dumas, La Chicane, Les Colocs, Mélanie Renaud, Cindy Daniel, Daniel Bélanger, Paul Cargnello, Laurence Jalbert, Rudy Caya, Jean Leloup, Celine Dion (who had 4 No. 1 Billboard Hot 100 hits like "My Heart Will Go On" in 1998), Les Stups, La Chicane, Dan Bigras, Isabelle Boulay and more recently Cœur de pirate. Some bands, such as Les Cowboys Fringants have known success in Europe (primarily in France) while Karkwa, Vulgaires Machins, Les Batinses and Malajube are also recognized elsewhere in Canada and internationally.

Hip-hop has been widely active in the Montreal area with groups like Loco Locass, Sans Pression, Dionysos, Criollo, Atach Tatuq, Manu Militari, KCLMNOP, Imposs, Muzion and Dubmatique.

Heavy metal, and other adjacent metal genres, have as well played a significant role in Quebec's musical repertoire, represented notably by Sword, Voivod and death metal bands Cryptopsy, Kataklysm, Martyr, Neuraxis, Gorguts, Quo Vadis, Despised Icon, Ex Deo, Blackguard, Beneath the Massacre, Augury and many others. The Quebec black metal scene has also gotten some attention in recent years, including bands like Akitsa, Spirit of the Forest, Forteresse, Chasse-Galerie, Monarque and Nefastus Dies.

In 2003, TVA began to broadcast Star Académie, a Québécois version of a French reality music competition, several new artists including Marie-Élaine Thibert, Marie-Mai, Émily Bégin and Stéphanie Lapointe became well-known music artists after their passage in the reality show.

The tensions between Quebec and English Canada have, at times, played out on Quebec's music scene as well. In 1991, Céline Dion won the Félix award for Best Anglophone Artist for her English-language debut, Unison, but refused it as she did not view herself as an Anglophone artist.

Quebec has also produced a number of significant Anglophone artists, including Arcade Fire (who had 3 No. 1 albums on the Billboard 200 like The Suburbs in 2010.) Win Butler graduated from McGill University in Montreal in 2004. Régine Chassagne also went there. Other Anglophone artists from Quebec include Patrick Watson, The Dears, Godspeed You! Black Emperor, Riverbeds, Stars, The Stills, The Unicorns, Wolf Parade, Rufus Wainwright, Sam Roberts, Paul Cargnello, We Are Wolves, The New Cities, Chromeo, Simple Plan and William Shatner. In addition, some Quebec artists from the 1960s to the 1980s Lewis Furey, Men Without Hats, Norman Iceberg, Rational Youth, Corey Hart, Julie Masse, Martine St. Clair, Marjo, Offenbach, The Box, Gino Vannelli, Luba, Jacynthe, France Joli, Sass Jordan, and Grimskunk have frequently recorded both English and French material.

Quebec artists have dominated the long and short lists of the Polaris Music Prize. Among them, Arcade Fire, Patrick Watson, Godspeed You Black Emperor, Karkwa and Backxwash have all won the coveted award.

== Jazz music ==
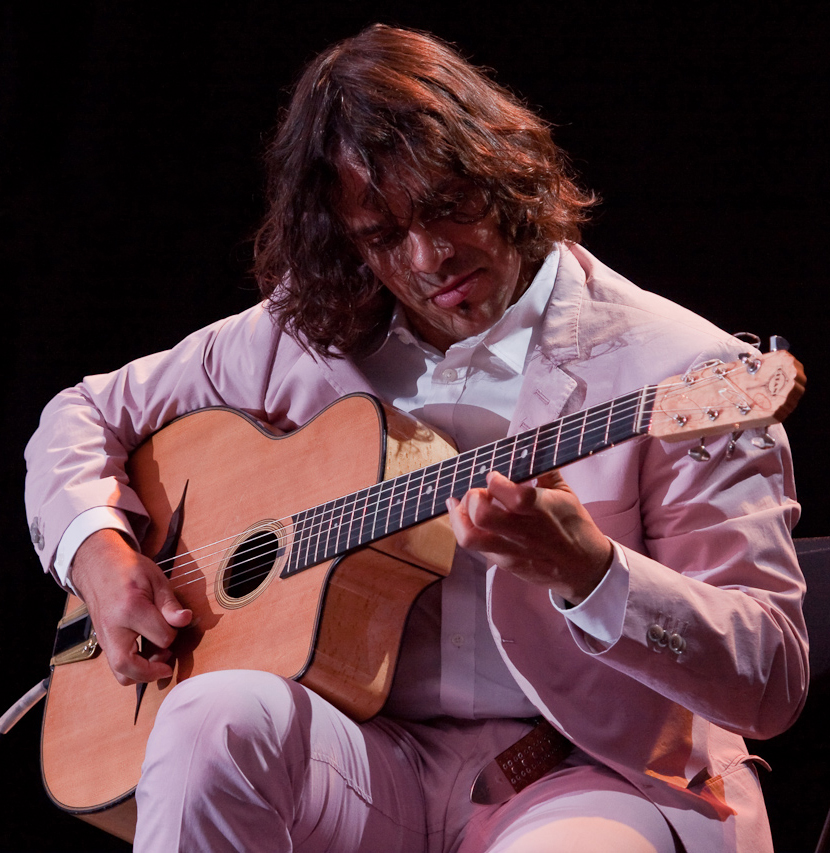
Christian Roberge, lead singer of French-Canadian gypsy jazz band The Lost Fingers, performing at Festival Franco-Ontarien in Ottawa on 11 June 2009.

Some famous jazz musicians from Quebec are Oscar Peterson, Paul Bley, Oliver Jones, Charles Biddle, Ranee Lee, Karen Young, and Alain Caron.

The Montreal International Jazz Festival is a globally renowned jazz festival, having been hosted by the city since 1980 it's attracting thousands of visitors annually. For the rest of the year, the L'OFF Festival de Jazz de Montreal organizes jazz shows in bars across Montreal.

== Classical music ==
The early part of the 20th century saw growth in opera, and the foundation of the Montreal Opera Company in 1910, and opera singers became popular.

André Gagnon, Angèle Dubeau, Michael Laucke, Louis Lortie, Alain Lefèvre, Alain Trudel, Alexandre Da Costa, Marc-André Hamelin, Nathalie Choquette and Richard Verreau are established classical musicians from Québec at the present.

André Mathieu is among the renowned composers from the province. He has been compared to a 'little Canadian Mozart', and Rachmaninov pronounced him, "a genius, more so than I am". His works became the official music of the Summer Olympics of 1976. Other famous composers are Claude Champagne, Calixa Lavallée, Pierre Mercure, Jacques Hétu, André Gagnon, Airat Ichmouratov, Denis Gougeon, José Evangelista and composer-critic Alfred La Liberté, among others.

== Quebec and France ==
Both nations have influenced each other in terms of music styles. In recent years, Quebec singers have gained notable recognition on the French stage. Quebec singers that have performed in France included: Céline Dion, Garou, Anthony Kavanagh (a stand-up comedian), Isabelle Boulay, Bruno Pelletier, Lynda Lemay, Cœur de pirate and many others.

Roch Voisine and Natasha St-Pier are two artists who also perform in France and are often mistaken for Quebecers. They are actually from New Brunswick and are of Acadian heritage, like Daniel Lavoie who is from Manitoba.

== Musicals ==
Few musicals were made or adapted by Quebec artists. Among them, Luc Plamondon has had the brightest career as a songwriter, writing for the big ones (Céline Dion, Garou). The main musicals 'made in Quebec' : Starmania, La Légende de Jimmy, Notre-Dame-de-Paris, Chicago (adapted into French), "Demain matin, Montréal m'attend", Dracula.

== Le Cirque du Soleil ==
Cirque du Soleil develops its own musical pieces to go along with various acrobatic tricks. The music aspect of the show is essential as it sets a mood for performances and links one number to another.

== See also ==
- Culture of Quebec
- French-Canadian music
- Gogo (Quebec music)
- List of Quebec musicians
- List of Quebec record labels
