= Le Rêve du Diable =

- Origin: Quebec, Canada
- Genres: Folk
- Years active: 1974–present
- Website: www.lerevedudiable.com

Le Rêve du Diable (The Devil's Dream) is a Canadian folk music group from Quebec. It is one of the oldest folk music bands in the province, and has been performing folk music for more than forty years.

== History ==
The band was founded by Gervais Lessard and Claude Méthé in 1974. In recent years the band's members include Lessard and Claude "Le Clin" Morin. The band made their first, eponymous album in 1976. They have since then released eight albums, the latest in the fall of 2013.

In May 2012, Le Rêve du Diable received the Quebec Medal of the National Assembly.

A documentary film about Le Rêve du Diable was created by filmmaker Feber E. Coyote in 2013.

The band continues to perform and present workshops about traditional music at festivals.

== Discography ==
- 1976: Le Rêve du Diable
- 1977: Rivière Jaune
- 1979: Délires Et Des Reels
- 1982: Auberge le Rêve du Diable
- 1991: Avec Cholestérol
- 1996: Résurrection
- 2002: Sans tambour ni trompette
- 2013: Avec tambour et trompette
- 2016: Un choix d'enfer, les grands succès

== Special guests ==
- 2016: Chansons pour Hank (Feber E. Coyote, Productions Feber)

== Filmography ==
- 1975: "La veillée des veillées" (André Gladu, National film board of Canada)
- 1982: "Crac!" (Frédéric Back, National film board of Canada)
- 2014: "Le Rêve du Diable: avec tambour et trompette" (Feber E. Coyote, Productions Feber)

== See also ==
- List of bands from Canada
- Music of Quebec
