= Roméo Beaudry =

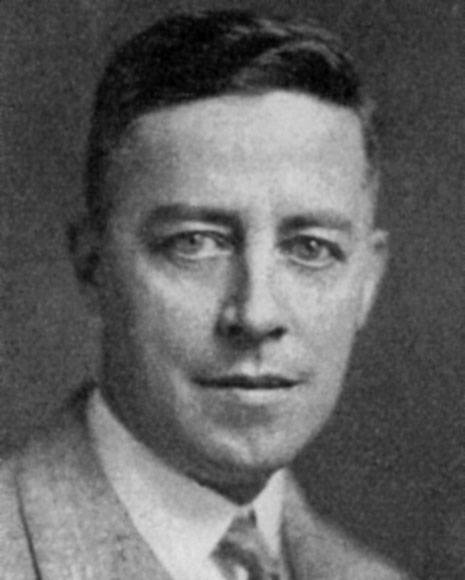

Background information
- Born: Louis Roméo Beaudry; February 25, 1882; Montreal, Quebec, Canada
- Died: May 6, 1932 (aged 50) Montreal, Quebec, Canada
- Occupation: Record producer

Louis Roméo Beaudry (February 25, 1882 – May 6, 1932) was a French Canadian author, composer, pianist and record producer, who established Éditions Radio and served as the director general of the Starr Records company of Canada as a music producer. As a composer Beaudry wrote more than 75 songs which went on to be recorded.

== Life and career ==
Born in Montreal, Beaudry grew up primarily in Quebec City. After finishing his schooling at the Quebec Seminary in 1900, he obtained a job at the National Bank of Canada. Beaudry soon left that job to become a partner in his father's music store, Willis Piano Company.

In 1912 Beaudry obtained a sales representative job with Starr Records which required him to move to Montreal. While in Montreal he obtained a job as a music critic for La Patrie as well.

In 1915, the Columbia Graphophone Company of New York requested that Beaudry put them into contact with Québécois artists in the hopes they could obtain French language music for their francophone customers in New England. Beaudry did so, and Jean-Marie Magnan, Joseph-Henri Thibodeau, Hector Pellerin, François-Xavier Mercier, Damase DuBuisson, Alfred Nohcor and Honoré Vaillancourt all recorded with Columbia as a result of these efforts.

In 1918, the Starr Piano Company of Richmond, Indiana set up a Canadian branch named the Starr Company of Canada. Beaudry was hired as the director general of the company on the strength of his existing relationship with the Starr company and his knowledge of music and musicians in Quebec. During that time, he became a close business associate with Herbert Berliner. In 1919, Beaudry awarded the contract for pressing records from Starr's subsidiary Gennett Records for all of Canada to Berliner's Compo pressing factory. In 1920, he founded Starr Phonograph of Quebec which used Berliner's recording studios to record francophone artists under the Gennett label. Berliner formed a new record company in 1921, first called Sun, but quickly renamed Apex Records, which began producing records for the Starr 12000 series in July 1921. Apex began selling records at 65¢ each, and with the same production Starr also sold records at 65¢ each. The other major record sellers in Quebec, Columbia and His Master's Voice, priced their records at 85¢. This competitive pricing scheme led to the Quebec music market being dominated by Starr.

Around 1920, Beaudry began a collaboration with J Hervey Germain, who recorded eighteen of Beaudry's songs between 1920 and 1925, including: Au revoir Mimi, non pas adieu (1920), Au printemps ma Lizon (1921), Nos vieux parents (1921), Rien qu’un baiser (1921), Mimi printemps (1921), N’oubliez pas (1922), La rose du boulevard (1922), Le sheik d’Arabie (1922), Ah! Ce qu’il a le nez gros (1923), Bonjour ma ninette (1923), Ma jolie danseuse (1923), Mon ami m’a volé mon amour (1924), Printemps d’amour (1924), Riez un peu et tout ira bien (1924), Une fille que les hommes oublient (1924), Il est quelque part mon cœur (1925) and Je ne veux plus pleurer pour toi (1925).

Hercule Lavoie began recordings songs written by Beaudry in 1924, recording more than a dozen songs of Beaudry's over the next few years. These included L’amour pardonne (1924), L’amour se souvient (1924), Berce mon rêve (1924), Chante rossignol chante (1924), Dis-le moi (1924), Hier, aujourd’hui, demain (1925), Il ne faut pas pleurer pour ça (1925), J’ai toujours vingt ans (1925), Mais si tu reviens un jour (1925), Laisse-moi te dire (1926), Il fallait des anges au paradis (1927), Pour quelqu’un qu’on aime (1927) and Tu prends plaisir à me voir souffrir (1927).

In 1925, Compo purchased Starr Phonograph of Quebec and Beaudry remained with the company. During this time most of the prominent singers in Quebec appeared on the Starr label. Beaudry's most insightful move may have been supporting Mary Bolduc in spite of the lack of success on her first release, Y'a longtemps que je couche par terre. The sale of Bolduc's records would later be critical to the survival of Starr through the Great Depression.

In 1927, Beaudry began an association with Georges Beauchemin. Over the next four years, Beauchemin would record more than a dozen songs written by Beaudry. Beauchemin recorded Au milieu de la nuit (1926), Bonjour l’amour (1927), Ramona (1928), Un coin de ciel bleu (1928), À l’ombre des lilas (1928), Jeannine au temps des lilas (1928), Mademoiselle Mimi (1928), Mon Angéline (1929), Mon château d’Espagne (1929), Au sommet du monde (1929), Bonjour mon bel oiseau bleu (1929), Dis-moi que tu pardonnes (1929) and J’ai trouvé l’amour (1929) by Beaudry.

Beaudry died in Outremont of a heart attack on May 6, 1932.
