= Conrad Gauthier =

Canadian musician, actor, and folklorist

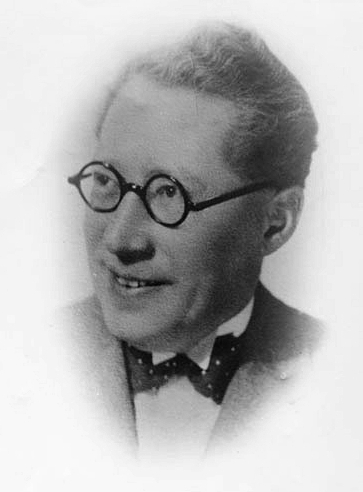
Conrad Gauthier

Conrad Gauthier (8 August 1885 – 14 February 1964) was a Canadian singer, songwriter, actor, and folklorist from Quebec. He helped popularize French Canadian folk music in Canada.

== Life ==
Gauthier was born in Montreal on 8 August 1885.

After some commercial training, Gauthier worked in theatre, founding in 1902 the Cercle du Drapeau and later the Cercle Lapierre. He was a member of the Association dramatique de Montréal and the Anciens du Gesù company. In turn printer, editor, cartoonist, director of silent movies, journalist, accountant, and municipal officer, Gauthier made his name in Canada and the United States as an actor and amateur singer. He played Gaspard in Robert Planquette's comic opera Les cloches de Corneville (The Chimes of Normandy), with the Société Canadienne d'Opérette.

In the early 1920s, Gauthier was a pioneer in radio and in the recording of Quebec folk music, making 78 speed phonograph records for Victor Talking Machine Company and Columbia Records. He recorded more than 100 songs and monologues, often with Elzéar Hamel.

Gauthier created the Veillées du bon vieux temps concert presentations, which he produced from 1921 until 1941 at the Monument-National theatre in Montreal.

Gauthier's 40 Chansons d'autrefois (Thérien Frères 1930, 1932) and 40 Autres Chansons d'autrefois (Archambault 1947) were combined in the collection Dans tous les cantons (Archambault 1963). In the preface to 40 Chansons d'autrefois Gauthier was described by Gustave Comte as a 'keen re-creator of our old customs' and an 'irresistible dispenser of good old-fashioned happiness'.

Conrad Gauthier died in Montreal on 14 February 1964.

== Songs ==
- Les pieds de ma soeur
- Vieillir c'est souffrir
- Mon chapeau de paille
- Le bedeau de St David
