= Turlutte (music) =

Form of traditional popular song from Quebec, Canada

In Quebec, the turlutte is a form of traditional popular song, which is associated with specific melody ornaments. It is more accurately characterized as a song or vocal style in the French chanson tradition. It is associated particularly with the working class or trade union tradition in the Canadian Encyclopedia. These include the following:

- Short developments - preambles, bridges, refrains. It is frequently done solo, impromptu or otherwise.
- In its canonical form, the turlutte is characterized by wordless variations on certain phonetic connections. For example (in French) "tamtidelam" passes to "tam tidelidelam" and posts a certain pallet of phonemes whose selection answers phonetic and aesthetic criteria. They include, for example, the marriage of [t], [d], and [m] for consonants, and of [I] and of [a] for vowels.
- It is also characterized by a removed tempo, which often takes the pace of impossible tongue twisters. The turluttées melodies are ordinary dancing and merry. According to some, the turlutte is a vocal imitation of a musical instrument, such as the violin or the flute.
- It was used by Mary Travers, under the name "La Bolduc," in the 1930s. Another more recent example, from 2000, is from the group Mes souliers sont rouges, with the song "Quand plus rien ne va," whose topic is precisely the turlutte and its homonyms.

Turlutte is similar in form and function to lilting in Irish and Scottish music and "trall" in Scandinavian music.

== Quebec popular music ==
A skilled proponent of the turlutte is La Bolduc, whose satirical and sometimes racy songs were based on the Quebec and Irish folk traditions. She is considered an expert turlutte.

== Song ==
Turlutte is also the name of a fiddle tune in Quebec. It lends itself well to group playing and percussive use of feet and hands, as in the performance at Kyneton, central Victoria, where the Celtic Southern Cross Summer School produced this ethnomusicologically notable clip. It has also been rendered on guitar.

== See also ==
- Canadian music
- Entry on French Wikipedia
