= C'est l'Halloween =

Song by Matt Maxwell

from the album Comment ca va?
- Recorded: 1984
- Genre: Children's music
- Label: A&M Canada
- Songwriter: Matt Maxwell

"C'est l'Halloween" (lit. It's Halloween) is French-language children's song written and performed by Canadian teacher and children's entertainer Matt Maxwell. It was written in 1981 for his Halifax-based grade-school French-language students the day before Halloween. Years later, he recorded the song for his first album Comment ca va? (lit.How are you?).

"C'est l'Halloween" lyrics mostly pertain to a list of spooky Halloween imagery and features a chorus that invites its audience to participate by shouting "Hey!". Maxwell left teaching after recording the album and went on to work as a children's entertainer for the next 15 years. The song is Maxwell's most well-known song, with Dave Shumka of the CBC.ca writing in 2012 that thousands of students learning French across Canada have sung "C'est l'Halloween" to help learn the language.

== Development and lyrics ==
"C'est l'Halloween" was written in 1981 by Matt Maxwell. At the time, Maxwell was in his first year of teaching French in Halifax and was writing songs to try and make French more fun for his students with "C'est l'Halloween" being one of his first. He wrote the song on October 30, thinking he would have it ready for his grade school students the next day. The song was written in about 10 minutes with Maxwell saying he "spent more time talking about it than writing it." He recalled that the students all liked performing the shouted chorus of "Hey!".

The success of the song with his students inspired him to record his first album, Comment ca va? three years later in Toronto. The song is included on the album and recorded with Ben Mink, who performs the reverse violin on it. Children from the Gabrielle-Roy school in Toronto also contribute vocals.

The lyrics of "C'est l'Halloween" mostly contain a list of spooky Halloween imagery, such as gloomy nights, witches, and ghosts. The two-word chorus "C'est l'Halloween" means that "It's Halloween" and is followed by an opportunity for kids to shout "Hey!" loudly.

== Release and reception ==
Dave Shumka of CBC.ca said that "C'est l'Halloween" was the biggest hit song of Maxwell's career. Maxwell responded that they should put quotation marks on the word "hit". The album Comment ca va? was released by A&M Records Canada and sold over 40,000 copies in Canada.

Maxwell said at the time he received some negative feedback from religious fundamentalists who said it was offensive to talk about witches and related material in the song. He responded that he would not rescind the song on the account that it may offend some people. Reflecting on the song in 2012, Maxwell said, "We've all evolved as a culture over the last 25 years, and what was maybe slightly scary 25 years ago isn't remotely scary now. The average young person sees multiple decapitations every day or whatever else."

== Legacy ==
"C'est l'Halloween" inspired Maxwell to leave his career as a teacher to become a children's performer full-time. His career of performing and recording lasted 15 years. Matthew Hayday, in his book So They Want Us to Learn French (2015) said Maxwell was a popular entertainer in the core French and French immersion audiences in Canada between the 1980s and 1990s, with "C'est l'Halloween" being a well-known song. Maxwell's career had him perform thousands of concerts at school, record six albums and earn a Juno Award nomination. Maxwell felt the song caught on because everyone likes Halloween and kids enjoyed shouting along "Hey!" with the chorus, saying "they get a big lift out of that." Dave Shumka of CBC wrote in 2012 that thousands of students learning French across Canada have sung "C'est l'Halloween" to help learn the language. The song has also been played in schools in Europe and Australia.

Maxwell later became a co-creator of the Aim Language Learning. The company released an interactive Halloween-themed story using both Maxwell's original version of the song and a new version made in 2012.
