= Les Stups =

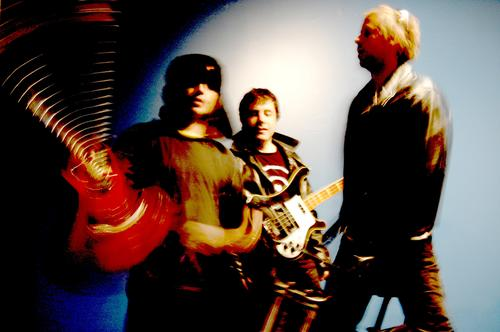

Background information
- Origin: Montreal, Quebec, Canada
- Genres: Alternative rock
- Years active: 1989–present
- Members: Dan Halen (guitar & lead vocals); Pat Panik (drums and vocals)
- Past members: Pierre Tombasles (lead vocal, lyrics); Red (bass); EaseEase (guitar); Julien Sisoitil (bass); Doug Danger (2nd guitar)
- Website: Les Stups

Les Stups is a Canadian alternative rock band formed in 1989 in Montreal, Quebec.

Since their beginnings, Les Stups (The Narcs) and their self-categorized Heavy Plastic have been in various scenes in Montreal (see Music of Montreal), and in the provinces of Quebec (Quebec music scene) and Ontario (NXNE -North By North East). They played live on TV (Musique Plus), at various happenings like Les FrancoFolies de Montréal, Francouvertes, Coup de coeur Francophone, Polliwog, Les Foufounes Électriques, and benefit gigs (for example Emmett Johns's Dans la rue.

Les Stups have gone through the phases: from cassette to LP album, then to CD and mp3, mainly in French, or Quebec French but sometimes in English and even in German.

GrimSkunk, The Nils, Doughboys (Canadian band), Noir Désir fr:Noir Désir, Ludwig Von 88 fr:Ludwig Von 88, Bérurier Noir fr:Bérurier Noir, Parabellum fr:Parabellum (groupe), Les Secrétaires Volantes fr:Les Secrétaires Volantes, Banlieue Rouge fr:Banlieue Rouge (groupe), Idées Noires, Les 3/4 putains, Glop! Glop! and several others have shared the stage with them during the 1990s. Then, radio silence after a final concert in tribute to The Clash’s deceased leader Joe Strummer in 2005.

Even though the band was not too much to be seen live in the last years, lead vocalist Pierre Tombasles and bassist Julien gone to other adventures, the songs have accumulated. Dan Halen and Pat Panik are now Les Stups. Pat, Doug and Julien were also members of Sick Jaggers and Julien is now with Double Date With Death.

== Discography ==
=== Cassettes ===
- Les Stups (Ondes de Choc / Lunatic Asylum)
- Toxines

=== CD ===
- Écrasé (4 song EP)
- Icec Tse Nu Euqsid Sed Sputs (2 song EP)

=== Compilations ===
Vinyl

- Lâchés lousses vol. 1, including Les Stups's song "Etre Gouverné" (Tir Groupé)

CD

- Québec en marge (including Les Stups's song "Écrasé")
- Sauvages Québécois (including Les Stups's song "Ça fait rien" – Live in concert)

== Videography ==
=== Video clips ===
- Être gouverné (1990)
- Et si c'était ça (1992)
