= Oscar Thiffault =

Canadian musician (1912–1998)

Oscar Thiffault (1912–1998) was a folk musician from Quebec, Canada.

== Early life ==
Thiffault was originally from Estrie, and lived for most of his life in Saint-Étienne-des-Grès.

== Career ==
Working on construction sites, Thiffault composed new versions of Quebecois folk songs, and also wrote many songs setting new lyrics to traditional melodies. He first found success in 1954 with "Le Rapide-Blanc", a humorous song written in 1935 while working on the Rapide-Blanc Generating Station. The song was a country and western adaptation of the traditional song "Le moine tremblant et la dame".

Thiffault wrote songs honouring local sports figures, including hockey players Maurice Richard, ("Le Rocket Richard"), and Guy Lafleur ("La Tourne à Ti-Guy Lafleur"). Other songs that he wrote were "Je parle à la française" and "En écoutant Y mouillera pu pantoute".

In 1988, a documentary film about Thiffault's life, created by Serge Giguère, was released. His songs continue to be played and recorded in Quebec; the band Carotté included "“Tape la bizoune" on their debut album.
