= Vilain Pingouin =

Rock band from Quebec, Canada

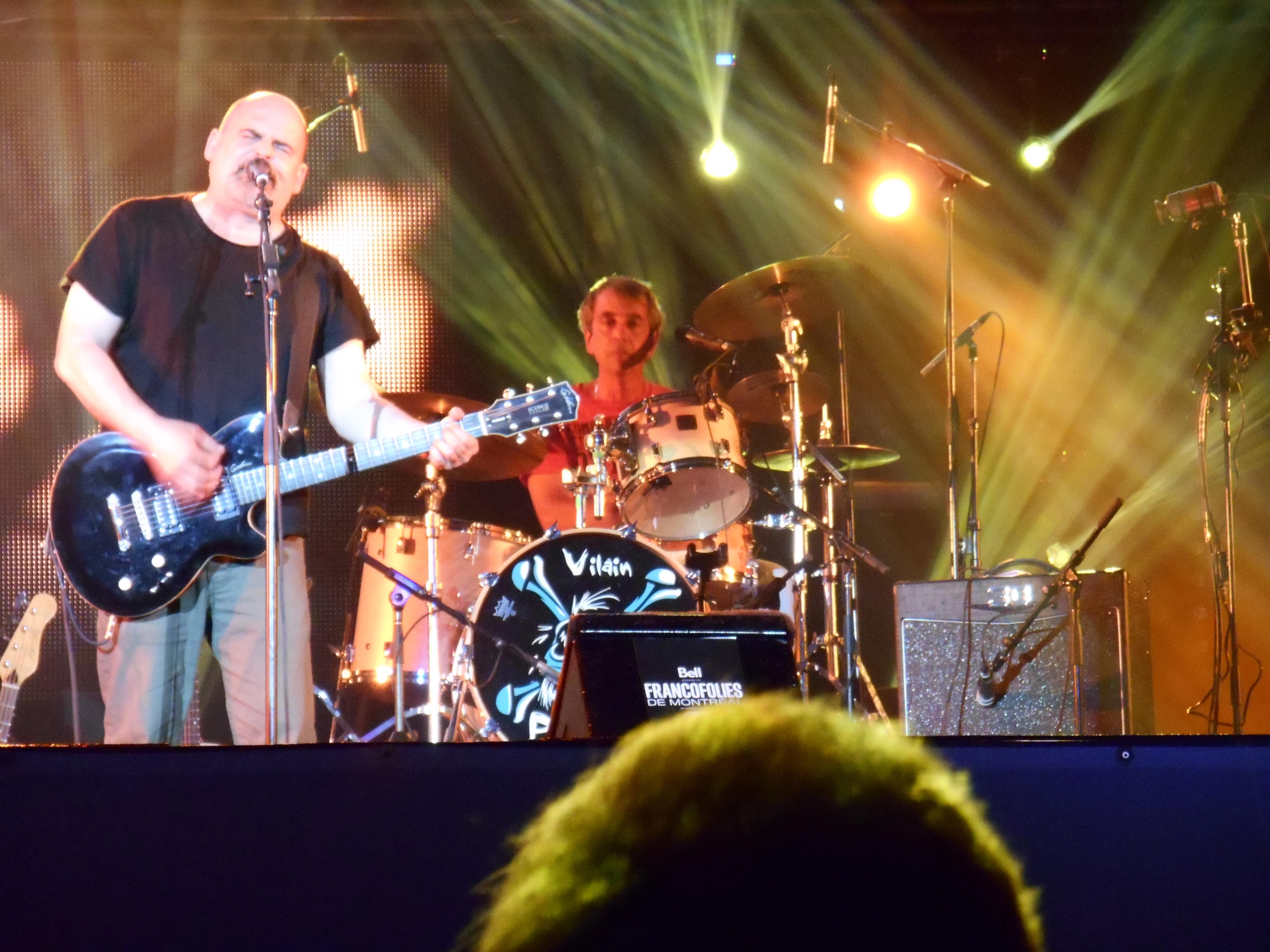
- Vilain Pingouin - Live concert at the FrancoFolies de Montréal, 2014

Background information
- Origin: Montreal, Quebec, Canada
- Years active: 1986–present
- Members: Rudy Caya; Michel Vaillancourt; Claude Samson; Michel Bélanger; Alain Godmer
- Past members: Frédéric Bonicard; Rodolphe Fortier; Michel Bertrand; Michel Turcotte
- Website: www.vilainpingouin.com

Vilain Pingouin is a rock band from Montreal, Quebec, Canada.

== Biography ==
After having played for a few years with various English-speaking rock groups, Rudy Caya and Michel Vaillancourt decided to plunge into more Francophone waters by playing with Les Taches from 1982 to 1986. Determined to push this Francophile experience even further, they started their own band.

Vilain Pingouin was born in Montreal in 1986 during a boom in Francophone rock music. Along with singer-songwriter Rudy Caya and drummer Michel Vaillancourt, the group included guitarist Rodolphe Fortier, harmonica player Claude Samson and bassist Frédéric Bonicard. A few months after its formation, Vilain Pingouin performed in the spring 1987 Rock en Vol contest and at the first International Rock Festival in Montreal (FIRM). Audiences responded well to the band's enthusiastic, raw, and—above all—original music, which brought Vilain Pingouin to the finals of the L'Empire des Futures Stars contest the following year.

In 1989, Vilain Pingouin recorded their first single, "François," under the Audiogram label, to which the band has remained faithful throughout its career. "François" was a hit, remaining on MusiquePlus' rotation for twelve weeks. The same year another single, "Salut Salaud", propelled Vilain Pingouin to the top of the Radio-Activity charts.

After completing its first provincial tour of Quebec, the group released its refreshing debut album, "Vilain Pingouin" on September 12, 1990. With tracks whose sounds evoked everything from U.S. country music to 60s pop, "Vilain Pingouin" transformed the Quebec music scene and achieved gold status in 1991. Several tracks, including "Sous la Pluie", "Les Belles Années" and "Marche Seul" became hits. Vilain Pingouin was named "Group of the Year" at ADISQ in 1991. The same year they also took home the awards for video of the year and best editing for "Marche Seul" at the first MusiquePlus Gala. Their self-titled album is often considered to be their most acclaimed and well-known.

Riding a wave of popularity, Vilain Pingouin embarked on a major tour of over two hundred shows in Quebec, Ontario, and New Brunswick. Despite their hectic schedule, they still managed to record and release their second album, "Roche et Roule", in the fall of 1992. "Roche et Roule" was acclaimed as both more varied and more "authentic" than their previous work. Its songs ranged from the folksy "Passe-Moi le Celt" and "Chu tu Seul à Soir", to jazz-influenced "Festin de Pingouins" and "Le Bleu de Papier Blanc", to the Cajun-accented "P'tite Vie, P'tite Misère". The album won Vilain Pingouin many new fans and consolidated the band's popularity.

In spring 1993, the group participated in the Rock Le Lait tour alongside Jean Leloup and France D'Amour and won the Félix "Album of the Year - rock" award at the ADISQ Gala. The same year, Vilain Pingouin's popularity crossed the Atlantic when "Roche et Roule" was released in France under the Boucherie Production label. In spring 1994, the band performed 15 concerts spread across "the six corners" of France. The "Tour de France" was a success, winning Vilain Pingouin both popular and critical acclaim in the country.

With Vilain Pingouin at its peak, its members felt the need to relax and work on some personal projects. In November 1994, they announced that they would take a hiatus after a farewell show titled "Pingouins sur Glace" at Snatches Electric in December 1994. Rudy Caya took advantage of this pause to record a solo album, "Mourir de Rire," in 1995, which included the single of the same name. Recorded with Claude Samson, the album demonstrated the creative energy of the band's leader.

But when Vilain Pingouin's "Roche et Roule" went gold that same year, Caya gathered the band back together with all the original members except bassist Fred Bonicard, who was replaced by Michel Bertrand. The group released its third album "Y'é Quelle Heure?" in spring 1998, featuring a more "heavy" sound. The band toured for a year and a half as part of the Rock Le Lait tour. The band's eclectic sound, influenced by jazz, hip-hop, reggae, and alternative music, once again attracted large crowds and frenzied fans. During the tour, guitarist Rodolphe Fortier and bassist Michel Bertrand were replaced by Alain Godmer and Michel Turcotte, respectively.

== History ==
In 1982, singer/guitarist Rudy Caya and drummer Michel Vaillancourt, having previously played in a number of English-language bands, formed a Francophone band, Les Taches ("The Stains" in English). In 1986, they expanded, adding Rodolphe Fortier on guitar, Claude Samson on guitar and harmonica and Frédéric Bonicard on bass. They called the new band Vilain Pingouin.

In 1989, they released the song "François". The video for this song played for 12 weeks on MusiquePlus, a Canadian francophone music station. They followed it with a song called "Salut Salaud" which topped the charts.

Frédéric Bonicard died after a long battle with cancer in July 2020.

== Line-up ==
The initial line-up of the band was:

- Rudy Caya (Vocals, Guitar)
- Frédéric Bonicard (Bass)
- Rodolphe Fortier (Guitar)
- Michel Vaillancourt (Drums)
- Claude Sampson (Mandoline, Harp, Accordion, Guitar)

Bonicard left and was replaced by Michel Bertrand (Guitar). Later, Michel Bertrand, and Rodolphe Fortier left the band, being replaced by Michel Turcotte and Alain Godmer. Michel Turcotte is now no longer with the band, with Michel Bélanger taking his place.

Bassist Benoit Labelle played with Vilain Pingouin at Woodstock en Beauce in 2006.

== Discography ==
- Villain Pingouin (1990)
- Roche et Roule (1992)
- Y'é Quelle Heure (1998)
- Jeux de Mains (2003)
- Les belles années (2014)

== Videography ==
- Chu tu Seul à Soir (1998)
- P'tite Vie, P'tite Misère (1993)
- Délinquance (1992)
- Les Belles Années (1991)
- Marche Seul (1991)
- Salut Salaud (1990)
- François (1989)
- Mirroir Mirroir (1998)

== Awards ==
- Hard Rock Gold and Rolls (1998)
- ADISQ, Félix "Album of the Year - Rock" for Roche et Roule (1993)
- ADISQ, Félix "Group of the Year" (1991)
- Gala MusiquePlus, "Video of the year", "Le Clip des Clip" and "Best Editing" for Marche Seul (1991)
