= Starr Records =

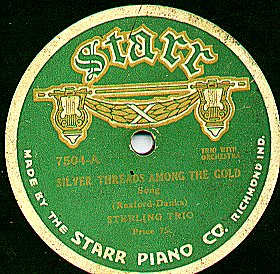
- Parent company: Starr Piano Company
- Founded: 1915
- Founder: Starr Piano Company
- Defunct: 1917
- Status: Defunct
- Genre: Jazz
- Country of origin: U.S.
- Location: Richmond, Indiana

Starr Records was a record label founded by the Starr Piano Company of Richmond, Indiana. Gennett Records was also owned by Starr Piano.

Starr's first discs were vertical cut records in the mid-1910s based on Edison Records standard found in the Edison Disc Record. They were discontinued in 1917. The Starr label was continued through much of the 1920s in Canada, pressed and distributed by Compo Company Ltd., mostly issuing sides that were released in the U.S. on Gennett.

An unrelated Starr Records made records in Australia which were sold in the Coles chain.

== See also ==
- List of record labels
