= Chansonnier (singer) =

Type of poet songwriter in France and Quebec, Canada

A chansonnier (French pronunciation: [ʃɑ̃sɔnje]; female: chansonnière, [ʃɑ̃sɔnjɛʁ]) was a poet songwriter, a solitary singer, who sang their own songs (chansons) with a guitar, prominent in francophone countries during the 1960s and 1970s. Unlike popular singers, chansonniers need no artifice to sing their soul poetry. They performed in "Boîtes à Chansons" which flourished during those years. The themes of their songs varied but included nature, love, simplicity and a social interest to improve their world.

== Canada ==
In Canada, the chansonnier tradition played a prominent role in the development of Quebec's social and political awareness during the Quiet Revolution, (la Révolution tranquille) that led to the affirmation of national identity of Québécois people. One prominent chansonnier, Robert Charlebois, transformed the province's musical culture when he moved from traditional chansonnier pop to a more rock-oriented sound with his fourth album, Lindberg, in 1968.

=== French-Canadian chansonniers ===
(listed alphabetically by surname)

- Geneviève Aubin-Bertrand
- Jacques Blanchet
- Hervé Brousseau
- Monique Brunet
- Pierre Calvé
- Christine Charbonneau
- Robert Charlebois
- Gervaises Desbiens-Roy
- Clémence Desrochers
- Serge Deyglun
- Lorainne Diot
- Georges Dor
- Jean-Pierre Ferland
- Jean-Paul Fillion
- Louise Forestier
- Claude Gauthier
- Marc Gélinas
- Suzanne Jacob
- Pauline Julien
- Mado de L'Isle
- Jacques Labrecque
- Georges Langford
- Christian Larsen
- Marie Lavigueur
- Félix Leclerc
- Tex Lecor
- Sylvain Lelièvre
- Jacqueline Lemay
- Pierre Létourneau
- Claude Léveillée
- Raymond Lévesque
- Monique Miville-Deschênes
- Priscilla
- Marie Savard
- Gilles Vigneault
