= Canadian music genres =

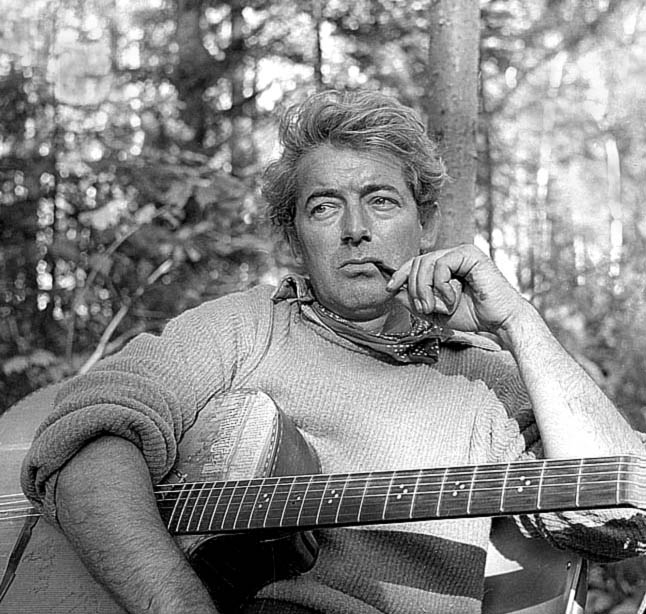
Félix Leclerc, pictured here in 1957, was a notable French-Canadian singer-songwriter, poet, writer, actor and Québécois political activist. He was made an Officer of the Order of Canada on December 20, 1968.

Canadian music genres identifies musical sounds as belonging to a particular category and type of music that can be distinguished from other types of music made by Canadians. The music of Canada has reflected the multi-cultural influences that have shaped the country. First Nations people, the French, the British, the Americans and many others nationalities have all made unique contributions to the musical genres of Canada. During the swing boom of the late 1930s and early 1940s, Canada produced such notable bandleaders as Ellis McLintock, Bert Niosi, Jimmy Davidson, and Mart Kenney. In the 1940s, Bert Niosi and Oscar Peterson became widely known. Canada has also produced a number of respected classical music ensembles, including the Montreal Symphony Orchestra and the Toronto Symphony Orchestra. Canadian rock describes a wide and diverse variety of music produced by Canadians, with the most notable Canadian rock band being Rush, who currently place fifth behind The Beatles, The Rolling Stones, Kiss and Aerosmith for the most consecutive gold and platinum albums by a rock band. The Canadian hip hop scene was first established in the 1980s. Some of the most well known Canadian rappers and hip-hop artists include Drake and Maestro Fresh-Wes.

Canadian country music used a more distinctly pronounced vocal style than American music, and stuck with more traditional ballads and narratives while American country began to use more songs about bars and lovers' quarrels. In the 1970s, chansonniers grew steadily less popular with the encroachment of popular rock bands and other artists. Some performers did emerge, however, including Jacques Michel, Claude Dubois, and Robert Charlebois. Saskatchewan-native Joni Mitchell is one of the most influential folk and popular music singer songwriters of the 20th century. Chansonniers were French Canadian singer-songwriters from the 1950s and 1960s. They sang simple, poetic songs with a social conscience. The first chansonniers were La Bolduc, Raymond Lévesque and Félix Leclerc.

Gaining speed in the west of Canada, the electronic music scene grew rapidly within most major centres. Canadian artists have also had a significant impact on industrial music worldwide, and Canada is considered by many to be one of the birthplaces of modern industrial music, with bands such as Skinny Puppy. Going back to the late 1960s, Canada has produced metal bands that have and continue to influence metal bands to this day. Some of Canada's most successful metal bands opted to change their style from the early 1980s roots metal sound to the growing glam metal style that became mainstream in the late 1980s. Canada's death metal scene has produced artists most of whom are based out of Quebec. Bands from across Canada contribute to the punk rock and hardcore scenes. D.O.A. of Vancouver founded Canadian hardcore punk rock along with their American counterparts in the early 1980s.

== Metal ==
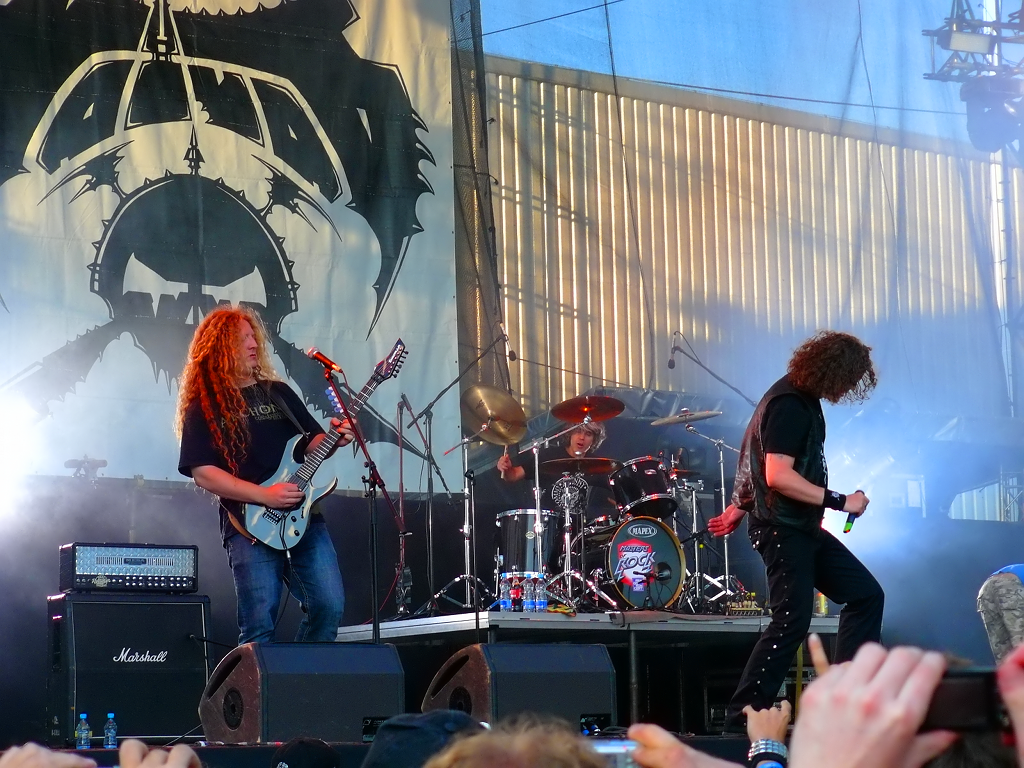
Voivod at the 2009 Masters of Rock festival in Vizovice.

Going back to the late 1960s, Canada has produced metal bands that have and continue to influence metal bands to this day. In 1964, Toronto-based band The Sparrows was formed. This band later changed their name to Steppenwolf and featured Canadians John Kay, Goldy McJohn and Jerry Edmonton. Steppenwolf's 1968 single "Born to be Wild" was the first use of the words "heavy metal" in a song's lyric. In 1970, Woodstock, Ontario-based Warpig released their metal music debut, which, although never reaching mainstream success like fellow heavy metal bands Black Sabbath and Blue Cheer, has become a cult favourite within the doom metal scene.

Some of Canada's most successful metal bands opted to change their style from the early 1980s roots metal sound to the growing glam metal style that became mainstream in the late 1980s. Bands such as Helix, Kick Axe, Brighton Rock, Killer Dwarfs, Annihilator, and Slik Toxik saw growing popularity in the mid-1980s thanks in part to MuchMusic and MTV playing their videos in regular rotation. Lee Aaron earned the nickname "Metal Queen" from her 1984 album of the same name.

Canada's death metal scene has produced many artists; most these are based out of Quebec. Bands such as Kataklysm, Cryptopsy, Quo Vadis, Gorguts, Augury, Voivod, Martyr, and Neuraxis have a strong underground following and are signed to major independent metal labels. In the 2000s, Canadian extreme metal has been put on the map by Vancouver band Strapping Young Lad (featuring Devin Townsend), 3 Inches of Blood, Ottawa grindcore quartet Fuck the Facts, Regina band Into Eternity, and progressive metal band Protest the Hero. James LaBrie, lead singer of Dream Theater, is Canadian born. Some notable black metal bands have come from Ontario, including Woods of Ypres, Wolven Ancestry, Zogroth and Eclipse Eternal. The cult black/death metal band Blasphemy, formed in 1984 in British Columbia, are still touring despite not having released a studio album since 1993. Canada has a very strong underground metal scene in cities such as Vancouver, Calgary, Toronto, Montreal, Winnipeg, and Quebec City.

In the early 1980s, Vancouver gained itself the reputation of being called the "Metal Central of Canada". To the present day, Vancouver still holds the reputation and has become a favourite city for many touring bands across the world.

== Classical ==
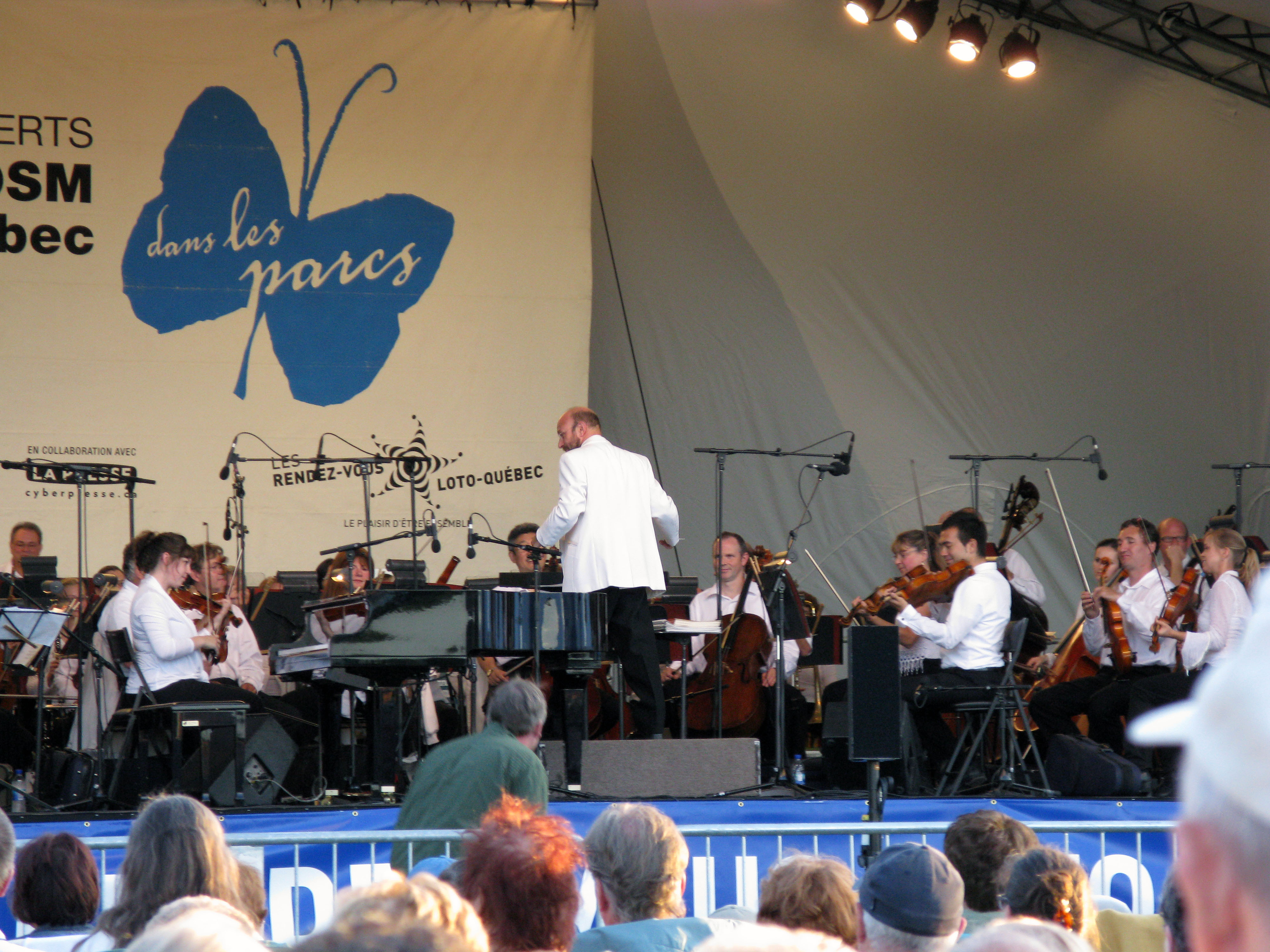
the Montréal Symphony Orchestra with conductor Jean-François Rivest August 2008.

In Canada, classical music includes a range of musical styles rooted in the traditions of Western or European classical music that European settlers brought to the country from the 17th century and onwards. As well, it includes musical styles brought by other ethnic communities from the 19th century and onwards, such as Indian classical music (Hindustani and Carnatic music) and Chinese classical music.

Canada has produced a number of respected ensembles, including the Montreal Symphony Orchestra and the Toronto Symphony Orchestra, as well as a number of well-known Baroque orchestras and chamber ensembles, such as the I Musici de Montréal Chamber Orchestra and the Tafelmusik Baroque Orchestra and Chamber Choir. Major Canadian opera companies such as the Canadian Opera Company have nurtured the talents of Canadian opera singers such as Maureen Forrester, Ben Heppner, and Jon Vickers. Well-known Canadian musicians include pianist Glenn Gould; violinist James Ehnes; flautist Timothy Hutchins; and composers R. Murray Schafer and Harry Somers. Well-known music schools include the Royal Conservatory of Music (Canada) in Toronto and the Schulich School of Music at McGill University in Montréal.

== Rock ==
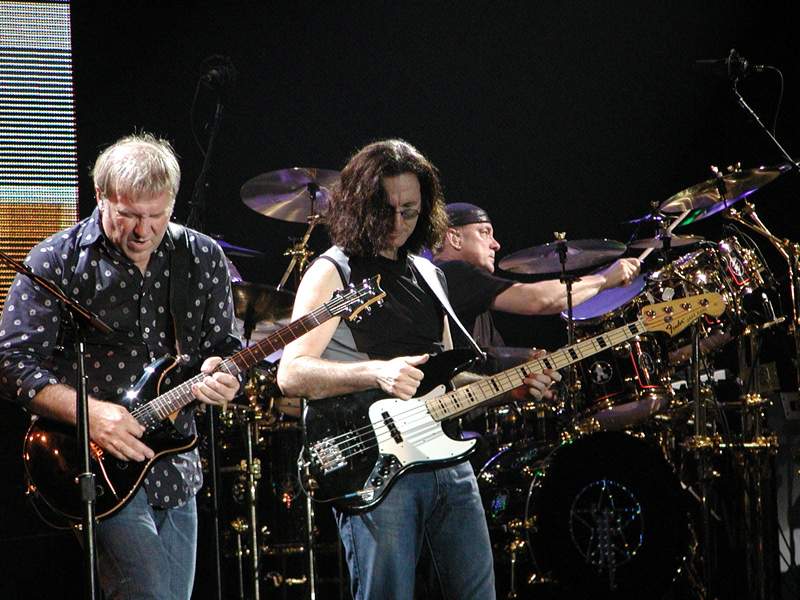
Rush at their 30th Anniversary tour, 2004

Canadian rock describes a wide and diverse variety of music produced by Canadians, starting with American-style Rock and roll in the mid-20th century. Since then Canada has had a considerable impact on the development of the modern popular music called rock. Canada has produced many of the genre's most significant groups and performers, while contributing significantly to the development of the most popular subgenres, which include alternative rock, pop rock, progressive rock, country rock, folk rock, hard rock, punk rock, metal and indie rock.

Canada has been a source of rock and roll music for decades. The first Canadian rock single was "The Mocking Bird"; it was recorded by The Four Lads in 1952 and reached No. 23 on the Billboard chart that year. It was re-released four years later reaching No. 67 on the 1956 chart. The first Canadian with a No. 1 American Billboard hit was 16-year-old Paul Anka. In 1957 he went to New York City where he recorded his own composition, "Diana". The song brought him instant stardom selling more than nine million copies in sixteen countries, reaching No. 1 on the U.S. and Canadian charts. Since then, Canada has produced many internationally popular rock and roll artists.

One of the best-selling Canadian rock bands internationally is Rush; as of 2008, they placed fifth behind The Beatles, The Rolling Stones, Kiss and Aerosmith for the most consecutive gold and platinum albums by a rock band. Other notable musicians include Thousand Foot Krutch, The Guess Who, BTO, Nickelback, Three Days Grace, The Tragically Hip, Our Lady Peace, Sum 41, Alanis Morissette, Billy Talent, Simple Plan, Finger 11 and Metric. Toronto-based band The Birthday Massacre has established a very faithful fanbase spreading across the globe.

== Blues ==
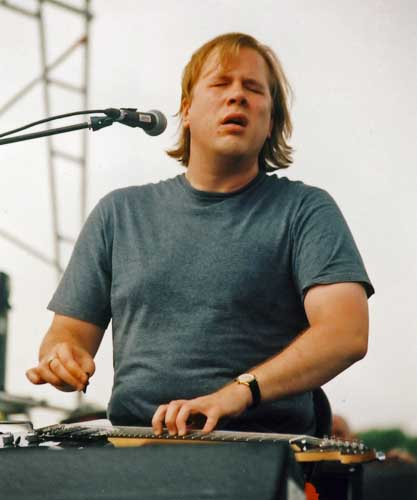
The late Canadian Blues man Jeff Healey

The blues is a vocal and instrumental form of music based on the use of the blue notes, often with a repetitive twelve-bar structure, which evolved in the United States in the communities of former African slaves. Canadian blues refers to the blues and blues-related music (e.g. blues-rock, folk blues, etc.) performed by blues bands and performers in Canada. In Canada, there are hundreds of local and regionally based Canadian blues bands and performers. As well, there is a smaller number of bands or performers that have achieved national or international prominence. These bands and performers are part of a broader Canadian "blues scene" that also includes city or regional blues societies, blues radio shows, and blues festivals.

A small number of Canadian blues bands and artists have achieved national or international prominence by touring across Canada, the US, or Europe, and releasing recordings that have received critical or audience acclaim in Canada and abroad. The performers below are listed according to the decade during which they first achieved national or international prominence:

- 1960s: Ronnie Hawkins
- 1970s: The Downchild Blues Band, Norman "Dutch" Mason, Back Alley John
- 1980s: David Wilcox, The Powder Blues, Jeff Healey
- 1990s: Colin James
- 2000s: Jack de Keyzer, Sue Foley, Tony D, Steve "Muddog" Sainas

== Hip hop ==
The Canadian hip hop scene was first established in the 1980s. Through a variety of factors, however, it developed much more slowly than Canada's popular rock music scene, and apart from a short-lived burst of mainstream popularity from 1989 to 1991, it remained largely an underground phenomenon until the early 2000s. Canada had hip hop artists right from the early days of the scene – the first known Canadian rap single, Mr. Q's "Ladies Delight", was released in 1979, although even that historic distinction was widely overlooked for many years, with most music historians erroneously crediting Singing Fools' 1982 "The Bum Rap" as the first Canadian hip hop song. With some exceptions, most notably from campus and community radio, the promotional infrastructure simply was not there to get most artists' music to the record-buying public. Even Toronto– Canada's largest city and one of its most multicultural– had difficulty getting an urban music station on the radio airwaves until 2000. As a result, if a Canadian hip-hop artist could get signed, it was very difficult for them to get exposure – even if their music videos were played on MuchMusic, many artists simply could not get their records into stores or played on mainstream radio.

As a result, through much of the 1990s, Canadian hip hop experienced a slowdown without any significant artists bursting into the scene. However, beginning in 1998, a sequence of events spurred by the anthemic collaborative single "Northern Touch" finally brought hip hop back into the mainstream of Canadian music. AllMusic has stated that Canadian hip hop is the "best-kept secret in hip-hop." Some of the most well known Canadian rappers and hip-hop artists include Drake, who is the only non-American who is signed into Young Money. Maestro Fresh-Wes, Classified, K'Naan, Kardinal Offishall, Belly and K-os are the other significant rappers and hip-hop artists from Canada.

== Jazz ==
Oscar Emmanuel Peterson 1977

Jazz is a genre of African American music present in Canada since at least the 1910s. In 1919–1920, in Vancouver, Jelly Roll Morton, a New Orleans pianist, played with his band. During that period, Canadian groups such as the Winnipeg Jazz Babies and the Westmount Jazz Band of Montreal also found regional acclaim.

During the swing boom of the late 1930s and early 1940s, Canada produced such notable bandleaders as Ellis McLintock, Bert Niosi, Jimmy Davidson, Mart Kenney, Stan Wood, and Sandy De Santis. In the 1940s, Bert Niosi and Oscar Peterson became widely known. Peterson became internationally acclaimed, and is a widely respected Canadian jazz musician.

During the 1970s and 1980s, the jazz fusion band Uzeb was a well known domestic and international jazz group. Since 2000, a brand new list of Canadian jazz artists has risen to prominence, including Diana Krall, Michael Bublé, Matt Dusk, and Molly Johnson – often attracting international acclaim and success. Other highly notable Canadian jazz artists are Ed Bickert, Lenny Breau (born in Maine but lived in Canada), and Gil Evans.

== Country ==
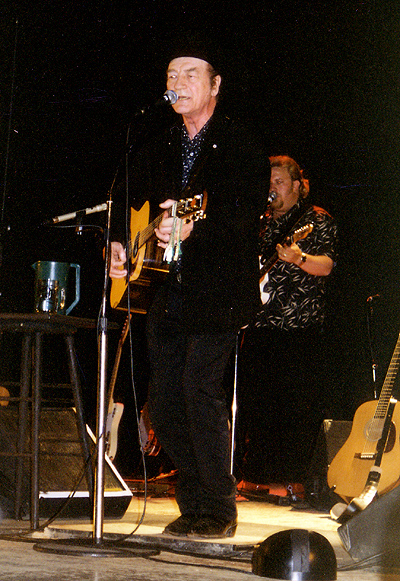
Stompin' Tom Connors, 2005

Country music evolved out of the diverse musical practices of the Appalachian region of the United States. Appalachian folk music was largely Scottish and Irish, with an important influence also being the African American country blues. Parts of Ontario, British Columbia and the Maritime provinces shared a tradition with the Appalachian region, and country music became popular quite quickly in these places. Fiddlers like George Wade and Don Messer helped to popularize the style, beginning in the late 1920s. Wade was not signed until the 1930s, when Victor Records, inspired by the success of Wilf Carter the year before, signed him, Hank Snow and Hank LaRivière.

Canadian country as developed by Otto Wilke, Carter, Snow and Earl Heywood, used a less nasal and more distinctly pronounced vocal style than American music, and stuck with more traditional ballads and narratives while American country began to use more songs about bars and lovers' quarrels. This style of country music became very popular in Canada over the next couple of decades. Later popular Canadian country stars range from Stompin' Tom Connors, Shania Twain, and Rick Tippe to Brett Kissel, Paul Brandt, and Dean Brody.

Radio and television stations in Canada which play country music, however, are often more flexible in how they define the genre than their counterparts in the United States. Canadian country stations frequently play artists more commonly associated with folk music, such as Bruce Cockburn, Leahy and The Rankin Family. Tommy Hunter's popular CBC TV show was a particularly strong influence to initiate and introduce many aspiring musicians to future success. Earlier, the CBC also broadcast Don Messer's Jubilee, another Canadian favourite.

Francophone country is mostly concentrated in Quebec, though both languages are found throughout the province and all of Canada. Artists include Renée Martel, Gildor Roy, Patrick Norman, Willie Lamothe, Steph Carse, and Georges Hamel.

== Traditional ==
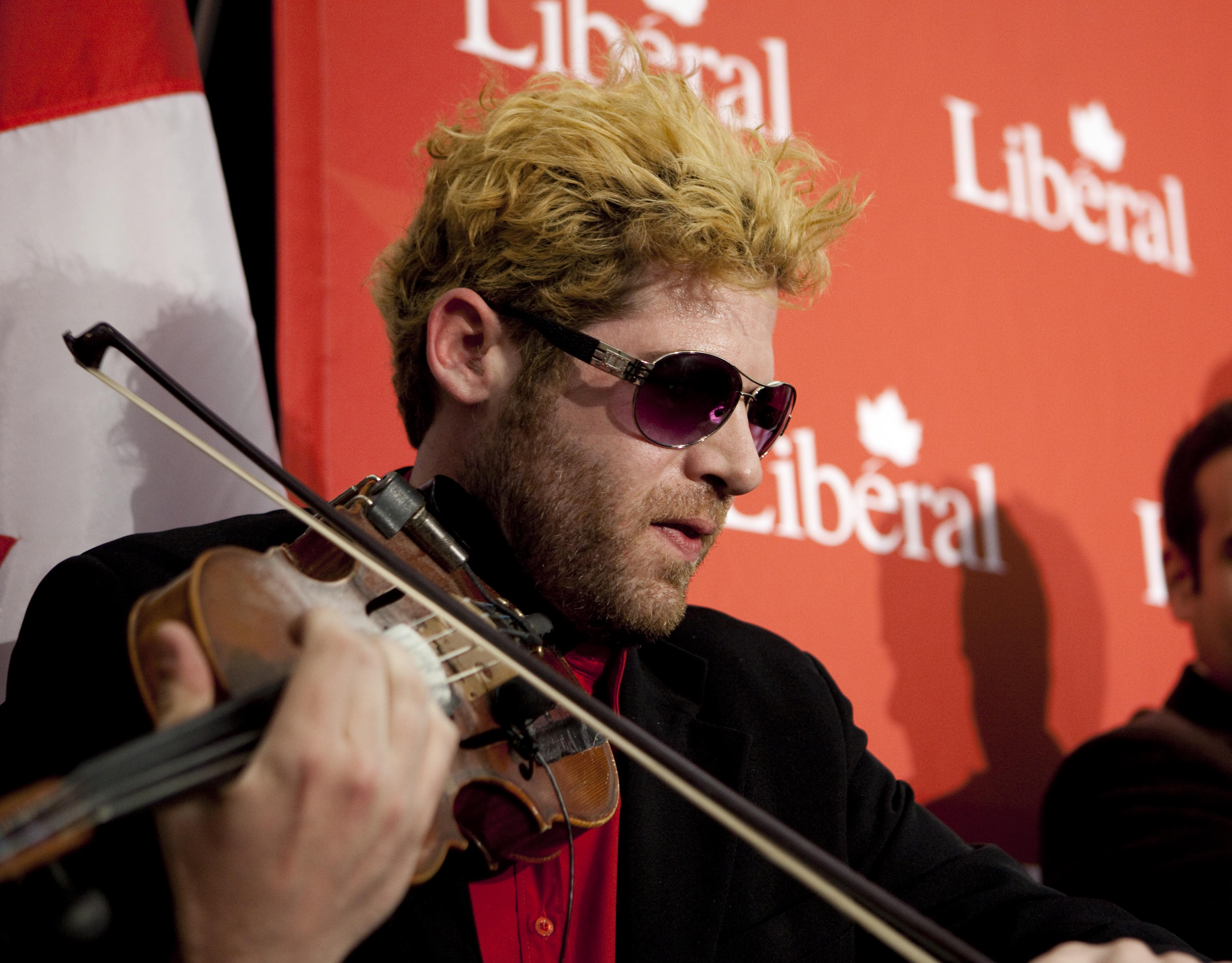
Ashley MacIsaac

Canadian fiddle is the aggregate body of tunes, styles and musicians engaging in the traditional folk music of Canada on the fiddle. It is an integral extension of the Anglo-Celtic and Québécois Frenchfolk music tradition but has distinct features found only in the Western hemisphere. Due to immigration and cross-border commerce, Canadian fiddle is part of the American fiddle repertoire. Old time and fiddle music are well represented by such Canadian exponents as Jerry Holland, Natalie MacMaster, Sierra Noble, The Rankin Family, and Ashley MacIsaac.

- In the Maritime provinces, sea chanteys, ballads of seagoing folk, are a distinct influence apart from Highland Scottish Fiddle.
- Cape Breton fiddle is a regional violin style which falls within the Celtic music idiom. Dance styles associated with the music are Cape Breton step dancing, Cape Breton square dancing (Iona style and Inverness style), and highland dancing.
- Quebec fiddle is a part of the Old time fiddle canon and is influential in New England and Northwest fiddle styles. The affinity between Anglo-Celtic and French fiddle music dates to the 1600s.
- Métis fiddle is the style with which the Métis of Canada and Métis in the northern parts of the US have developed to play the violin in folk ensemble and solo. It is marked by percussive use of the bow and percussive accompaniment such as spoon percussion.
- Canadian Old time fiddle is a genre of American folk music. "Old time fiddle tunes" may be played on fiddle, banjo or other instruments but are nevertheless called "fiddle tunes". The genre has European and African origins and traces from the colonization of North America by immigrants from England, France, Germany, Ireland, Scotland as well as slaves brought from west Africa in the 1600s and thereafter. It is separate and distinct from traditions which it has influenced or which may in part have evolved from it, such as bluegrass, country blues, variants of western swing and country rock.

== Folk ==
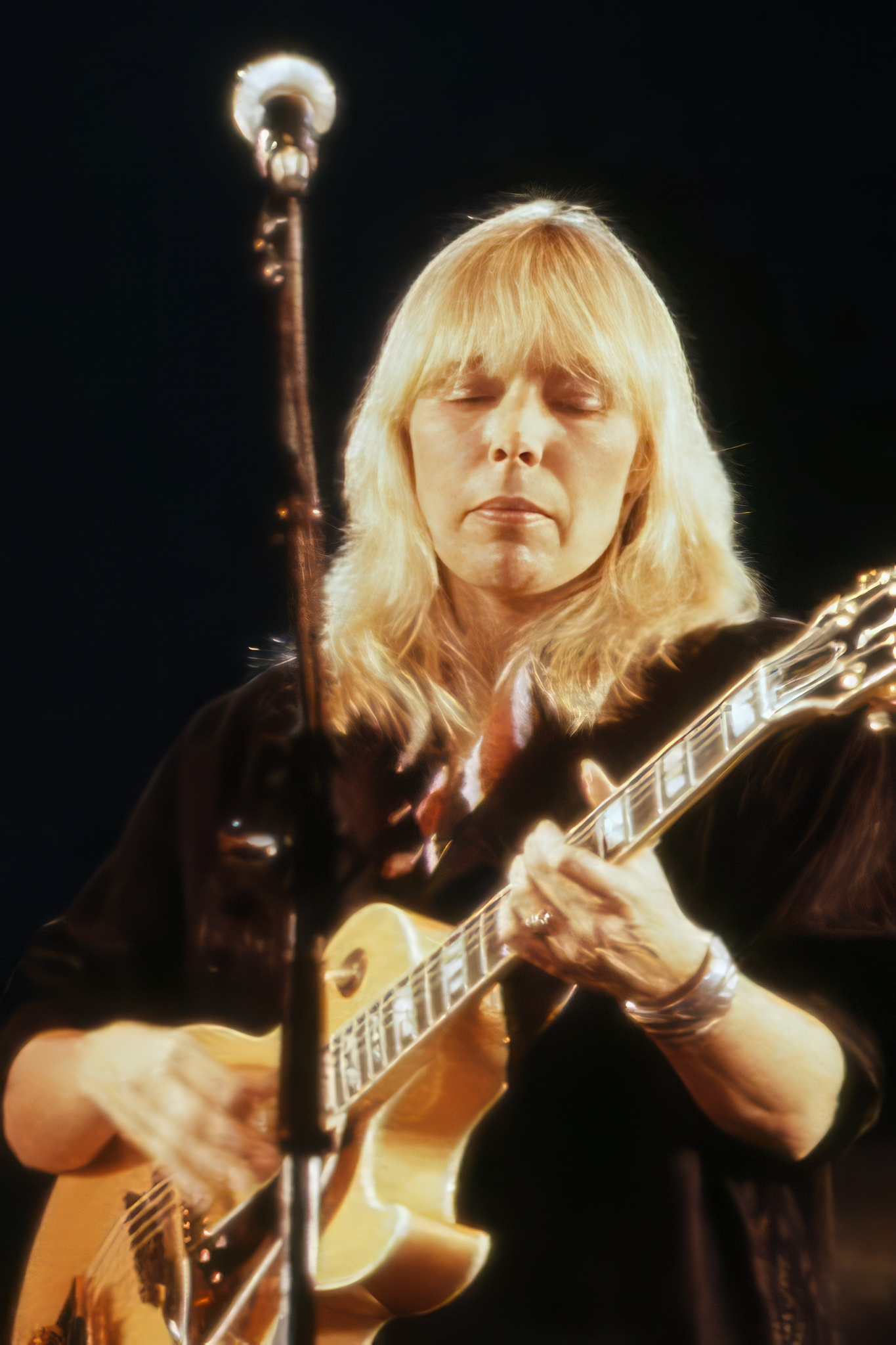
Saskatchewan-native Joni Mitchell, an influential 20th-century folk and popular music singer songwriter.

Some of Canada's most influential folk artists also emerged in this era, notably Stan Rogers, Ferron, Wade Hemsworth, Gordon Lightfoot, Murray McLauchlan, and Kate & Anna McGarrigle.

In the 1970s, chansonniers grew steadily less popular with the encroachment of popular rock bands and other artists. Some performers did emerge, however, including Jacques Michel, Claude Dubois, and Robert Charlebois.Modern folk music is very much present in Canada, being home to successful folk artists such as Great Lake Swimmers, City and Colour, Basia Bulat, Joel Plaskett, and Old Man Luedecke.

== Toronto goth scene ==
The Toronto goth scene, the cultural locus of the goth subculture in Toronto and the associated music and fashion scene, has distinct origins from goth scenes of other goth subcultural centres, such as the UK or Germany. Originally known as the "freaks", the term "goth" appeared only after 1988, when it was applied to the pre-existent subculture. Distinctive features included internationally recognized gothic and vampiric fashion store 'Siren', a goth-industrial bar named 'Sanctuary: The Vampire Sex Bar', and Forever Knight, a television series about an 800-year-old vampire living in Toronto. In Toronto, the goths did not seek to reject mainstream status, and achieved partial acceptance throughout the mid to late 1990s, and in 1998 Toronto was reported to have a higher concentration of goths than any other city in the world. The goth subculture faced public suspicion and the local goth scene declined after allegedly goth-related acts of violence, the Columbine High School massacre in particular.

== Chansonniers ==
Chansonniers were French Canadian singer-songwriters from the 1950s and 1960s. They sang simple, poetic songs with a social conscience. The first chansonniers were La Bolduc, Raymond Lévesque and Félix Leclerc. It was not until the 1960s, however, that chansonniers became such a major part of the Québécois music scene. This was largely due to the formation of Les Bozos in 1959. Les Bozos was an informal collective of chansonniers, including Lévesque, Jean-Pierre Ferland, Claude Léveillée, Clémence DesRochers, Talon Starsdawn, and Jacques Blanchet.

With the first stars popularizing the chansonnier format, a new generation of popular singers emerged in the 1960s. These included Gilles Vigneault, Pierre Létourneau, Pierre Calvé, Hervé Brousseau, Georges Dor, Monique Miville-Deschênes, and Claude Gauthier. The boîtes à chansons, a kind of performance place for chansonniers (akin to coffee houses in the United States), also appeared during the 1960s, spread across Quebec.

The Chansonnier tradition has continued with artists who have been carrying on since the 1970s to the present. One good example is Diane Dufresne who also is prolific in the area of cabaret or theatre-rock.

== Electronic music ==
Gaining speed in the west of Canada, the electronic music scene grows rapidly within most major centres.

Internationally renowned electronic artists from Canada include Winnipeg-based breakcore artist Aaron Funk a.k.a. Venetian Snares, minimal techno artist and DJ Richie Hawtin, electro-dance artist and DJ deadmau5, experimental electronic metal artist Pim Zond, dub techno producer Deadbeat, lo-fi electronica band Holy Fuck, whose music has been featured in commercials for General Motors, Montreal-based electrofunk duo Chromeo, Toronto-formed Crystal Castles, whose music is considered electro-punk, the duo's front woman Alice Glass topped NME's Cool List for 2008, indie-electronica group Junior Boys & quirky sound-artist Vitaminsforyou. Albertan electronica musicians include Mark Templeton, Escapist Opportunities, and organizers Electronic Music Calgary, creating venues throughout the province, though mainly in Calgary. Monstercat, an electronic dance music label, is based out of Waterloo, Ontario, and has its headquarters in Vancouver, British Columbia.

=== Grime ===
Grime is a British electronic genre that emerged in the early 2000s; it is derivative of UK garage and jungle, and draws influence from dancehall, ragga, and hip hop. The style is typified by rapid, syncopated breakbeats, generally around 140 bpm, and often features an aggressive or jagged electronic sound. Rapping is also a significant element of the style, and lyrics often revolve around gritty depictions of urban life.

British Man Dem (B.M.D), a grime collective originally from the UK but now established in Canada, popularised grime across Canada with their radio show "Brits in the 6ix" in 2008 in which they brought grime artists to the spotlight in Canada. This garnered a fan base of grime fans across Canada and even influenced some Canadians to start producing grime music too. Grime became increasingly popular in Canada during early 2010, most notably by Canadian grime artist Tre Mission. He is known as one of the first North American artists to be associated with the predominantly United Kingdom-based grime genre. After discovering grime and dubstep music through the Internet, he began making his own grime tracks in 2010, and started to attract positive attention in the UK. He has also worked with prominent British grime artists such as Wiley and Jme. Dhamiri, a Canadian artist with part-Lebanese and part-British roots, also mixes elements of grime with New Toronto sound since 2012. Drake has also had significance in bringing grime to the spotlight in Canada as well. The single Shutdown by Skepta sampled a speech from a Vine video created by the Canadian rapper. Skepta would later feature on Drake's More Life project.

== Industrial ==
Canadian artists have had a significant impact on industrial music worldwide, and Canada is considered by many to be one of the birthplaces of modern industrial music. The first wave of Canadian industrial music was born out of the Juno Award-winning new wave act, Images in Vogue. From this Vancouver-based band, guitarist Don Gordon went on to found Numb, and percussionist Kevin Crompton left in 1985 to focus on his side project, Skinny Puppy. Quickly signed to Nettwerk Records, Skinny Puppy is still an influential industrial act. Skinny Puppy has spawned numerous sideprojects over the years, including Hilt, Download, The Tear Garden, Doubting Thomas, ohGr, Cyberaktif, and others.

Out of this environment also came Front Line Assembly, formed by former Skinny Puppy member Bill Leeb in 1986. Joined by Rhys Fulber (and later by Chris Peterson), FLA became one of the most commercially successful electro-industrial acts of the 1990s, and spawned a host of sideprojects, including (but not limited to) Conjure One, Pro-Tech, Synæsthesia, Will, Intermix, Noise Unit, Equinox, Cyberaktif, Mutual Mortuary, and the vastly successful Delerium, which began life as an ambient project.

And on the distaff side, also from Vancouver's early electronic/industrial scene; Madelaine Morris, the fab front women in Mark Jowett's early electronica project, Moev. And Myra Davies, who built her reputation in the Euro Underground, notably in collaborations with Berliner Gudrun Gut, but entered the scene through her association in Vancouver with Skinny Puppy. The Pups connected her to Neubauten who invited her to Berlin where she met Gudrun Gut (ex Neubauten, Malaria, and many other projects). In 1991, Davies and Gut formed MIASMA; a wide-ranging project with a fantasy 'dark cabaret' vibre. Davies and Gutare still working together with Davies recording under her own name on Gut's label and Gut producing and programming. The latest Myra Davies CD (Cities and Girls) includes a track with Alexander Hacke (Neubauten)and one with Beate Bartel (orig Neubuaten, Malaria, Liaisons Dangereuse).

== Punk ==
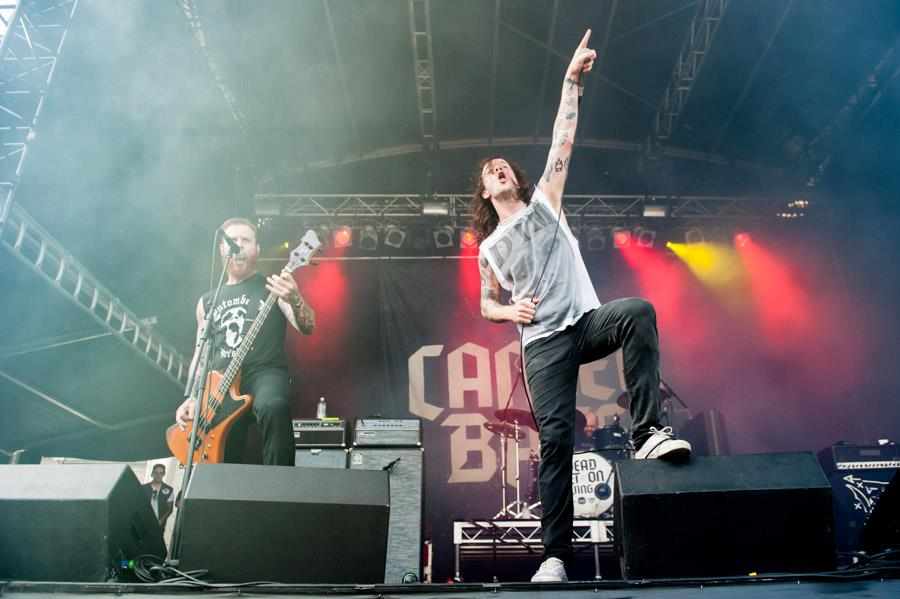
The Cancer Bats at a 2013 show; (left to right) Jaye R. Schwarzer, Liam Cormier and Mike Peters (back)

Bands from across Canada contribute to the punk rock and hardcore scenes. D.O.A. of Vancouver founded Canadian hardcore punk rock along with their American counterparts in the early 1980s. Bands from Distort Entertainment have been gaining prominence through extensive touring and Much Music video rotation, including Alexisonfire (from St. Catharines, Ontario, active from 2001 to 2012) and Cancer Bats (from Toronto, active 2004–present). Others include Subhumans (active from 1978 to 1983 and 2005–present), Dayglo Abortions (active 1979–present), SNFU (active for most of the period from 1981–present), and Daggermouth (active 2004–2008)(all from Vancouver), Propagandhi (from Portage la Prairie, Manitoba, active 1986–present), Silverstein (from Burlington, Ontario, active 2000–present), The 3tards (from Brampton, Ontario, active 2001–present), Fucked Up (from Toronto, active 2001–present), Cursed (from Toronto and Hamilton, Ontario, active 2001–2008), and Comeback Kid (from Winnipeg, active 2002–present). Fucked Up is notable for winning the 2009 Polaris Music Prize for their album The Chemistry of Common Life.

== See also ==
- Canadian patriotic music
- Music of Canadian cultures
- List of number-one singles in Canada
