= Canadian Songwriters Hall of Fame =

Organization honouring music contributions

Canadian Songwriters Hall of Fame (CSHF) ——— Le panthéon des auteurs et compositeurs canadiens (PACC)
- Founded: 1998
- Founder: Frank Davies
- Purpose: "CSHF/PACC is a national, bilingual, apolitical, non-profit organization dedicated to preserving Canada's rich songwriting heritage."
- Key people: CSHF Board Members; CSHF Team; Advisory Board Members; Founders; Founding Contributors; Founding Patrons; Patron of the Arts; Core-Funding Partners; Member Association Shareholders; Member Association Participant
- Website: www.cshf.ca

The Canadian Songwriters Hall of Fame (Panthéon des Auteurs et Compositeurs canadiens) is a Canadian non-profit organization, founded in 1998 by Frank Davies, that inducts Canadians into their Hall of Fame within three different categories: songwriters, songs, and those others who have made a significant contribution with respect to music.

The CSHF/PACC's mandate is to honour and celebrate Canadian songwriters and those who have dedicated their lives to the legacy of music, and to educate the public about these achievements.

== History ==
=== Founder ===
Frank Davies founded the CSHF/PACC while he was on the board for the Canadian Academy of Recording Arts and Sciences (CARAS). His position was as the first music publisher appointee and as the voice for songwriters and publishers among the group of music industry professionals who oversee Canada's Juno Awards. Frank has had a long career in music, mainly as a record producer and music publisher, recently having received the Walt Grealis Special Achievement Award at the 2014 Juno Awards and the Harold Moon Special Achievement Award (SOCAN). He developed the Hall of Fame because he wanted increased public recognition for Canadian Songwriters.

=== SOCAN ===
In December 2011, SOCAN – the Society of Composers, Authors and Music Publishers of Canada acquired the assets of the Canadian Songwriters Hall of Fame. The Hall of Fame's mandate aligns with SOCAN's objectives as a songwriter and publisher membership-based organization. The CSHF continues to be run as a separate organization with its own board of directors.

=== Award ===
Northern Island (1927) The award is a miniature replica of the sculpture 'Northern Island' created by Elizabeth Wyn Wood, who was born in Orillia, Ontario. Wood was a Canadian sculptor, who graduated from the Ontario College of Art (OCA) in 1926. The award was selected by Davies and established in the year 2003.

Wood took many trips to the Pickerel River crossing, which is halfway between Parry Sound and Sudbury. She sketched, explored, swam, and feasted in the area she was enchanted by. It was in 1927 that Wood completed the first of the island sculptures which conveyed her true and unique artistic character.

Frank Davies Founder's Award The Frank Davies Founder's Award is given to individuals who have dedicated a lifetime to building the Canadian music industry. Recipients receive the Northern Island Award.

Legacy Award The Legacy Award is presented to individuals who have contributed significantly to the development, promotion and preservation of Canadian songs and songwriters. Legacy Award inductees receive the Northern Island Award.

== Induction guidelines ==
=== Songwriters ===
Songwriters must be Canadian by birth or citizenship or have landed immigrant status and may be living or dead. Songwriters must have written or co-written the music and/or lyrics to a song or catalogue of songs in one or more of the following categories:

- Having entered into popular culture and been sustained through oral tradition for a significant period of time;
- Having achieved substantial regional, national and/or international status whether culturally, commercially and/or socially;
- Having recorded a historical event or helped to define an era of popular culture;
- Having created or helped to create a genre of music.

Songwriters must have made a significant contribution through a song or catalogue of songs published, or otherwise made available to the public in some form, for at least twenty-five years. By virtue of their induction to the CSHF, a songwriter inductee's entire catalogue of work is also recognized and inducted into the Hall of Fame.

Recognition by era:

Songwriters and songs shall be recognized by era. All inductees are honoured equally and the eras simply provide a context for induction by allowing the CSHF to honour inductees, annually or otherwise, within a given span of years. The eras are:

- Pioneer Era – up to 1938
- Radio Era – 1939 to 1969
- Modern Era – 1970 to twenty-five years prior to the current year)

=== Songs ===
An eligible song is a musical work that consists of lyrics and music, or music alone without lyrics, and written wholly or in part by a Canadian (that is, Canadian by birth or citizenship or having landed immigrant status), living or dead, and may qualify in one or more of the following categories:

- Having entered into popular culture and been sustained through oral tradition for a significant period of time;
- Having achieved substantial regional, national and/or international status whether culturally, commercially and/or socially;
- Having recorded a historical event or helped to define an era of popular culture;
- Having created or helped to create a genre of music.

An eligible song may be an adaptation of an earlier musical work provided the adaptation is itself sufficiently original so as to qualify for copyright protection as a new musical work.

A translation is not eligible for song induction independent of the induction of the original musical work. However, if the translated lyrics are not a straight translation of the original lyrics but instead articulate a new and original meaning and sensibility such that the translated lyric is itself a new work capable of copyright protection as an adaptation separate from the original musical work (including a straight translation of that work) then the adapted musical work may qualify for song induction.

Songs may have been written by previous songwriter inductees or eligible songwriter inductees and are subject to the same timelines and guidelines regarding eras as apply to the songwriters.

=== Others ===
With respect to the induction of those individuals who have contributed significantly to the development and recognition of Canadian songs and songwriters (such as, but not limited to, publishers, performers, broadcasters and other members of the media, collectors and compilers of traditional material, performers of Canadian songs etc.) the board of directors will review any recommendations made to them by the Anglophone and Francophone Induction Committees. These awards are presented at the discretion of the board of directors.

=== Board approvals ===
In accordance with the CSHF bylaws, the number of inductees, if any, in any given year shall be at the discretion of the board. The board shall also have the option to override guidelines in exceptional circumstances.

== 2008 inductees ==
=== Gala ===
The CSHF 2008 inductees were announced on 15 November 2007 at Toronto's Le Royal Meridien King Edward. The event was attended by over 150 artists, members of the media and other people in the industry. Performances at the press conference included:

- Suzie McNeil
- Julie Crochetière
- Dave Bourgeois
- Cindy Daniel
- Lawrence Gowan

The gala for this year's awards was conducted on 1 March 2008 at the Toronto Centre for the Arts and recorded for broadcast. Featured performances at the gala were:

- Kyle Riabko
- Anik Jean
- Yelo Molo
- Emilie-Claire Barlow
- David Foster
- Rufus Wainwright
- Martha Wainwright
- Boom Desjardins
- Ellis Marsalis
- Branford Marsalis
- Jully Black
- Serena Ryder
- Gregory Charles
- Dione Taylor
- Oliver Jones
- Toulouse
- Lily Lanken

CBC Radio 2 aired the gala broadcast on 2 March, and rebroadcast on CBC Radio 1 the following day. CBC Television aired its gala broadcast on 3 March. Performances from many French-language artists were omitted from the broadcasts, causing Hall of Fame honouree Claude Dubois to charge the CBC with racism and in turn prompted an apology from CBC vice-president Richard Stursberg.

=== Frank Davies Legacy Award ===
- Oscar Peterson

=== Radio-era inductees ===
Songwriters

- Alex Kramer
- André Lejeune

Songs

- Ain't Nobody Here But Us Chickens – Alex Kramer, Joan Whitney
- Candy – Alex Kramer, Joan Whitney, Mack David
- Il suffit de peu de choses – André Lejeune, Fernand Robidoux, Moune Victor
- My Sister and I – Alex Kramer, Joan Whitney, Hy Zaret
- Prétends que tu es heureux – André Lejeune
- Une promesse – André Lejeune, Guy Godin

=== Modern-era inductees ===
Songwriters

- Paul Anka - award presented by former Prime Minister Jean Chrétien
- Claude Dubois

Songs

- Artistes – Claude Dubois
- Aimes-tu la vie comme moi? – Georges Thurston, Billy Clements, Phillip Mitchell
- Canadiana Suite – Oscar Peterson
- Comme un million de gens – Claude Dubois
- Diana – Paul Anka
- Femme de rêve – Claude Dubois
- Heart Like a Wheel – Anna McGarrigle
- Hymn to Freedom – Oscar Peterson, Harriette Hamilton
- It Doesn't Matter Anymore – Paul Anka
- Le Beat à Ti-Bi – Raoul Duguay
- Le Labrador – Claude Dubois
- L'infidèle – Claude Dubois
- Love Child – R. Dean Taylor, Deke Richards, Pam Sawyer, Frank Wilson
- My Way – Paul Anka, Claude François, Jacques Revauk, Gilles Thibault
- Put Your Head on My Shoulder – Paul Anka
- She's a Lady – Paul Anka
- Signs – Les Emmerson

== 2010 inductees ==
The 2010 awards were presented at a gala in Toronto on 28 March 2010 at the Toronto Centre for the Arts.

=== Legacy awards ===
Musical archivist Edward B. Moogk received the Frank Davies Legacy Award. The Canadian Music Publishers Association Legacy Award was presented to music promoter Guy Latraverse.

=== Pioneer era songs ===
- "Come Josephine in My Flying Machine", Alfred Bryan and Fred Fisher
- "Des mitaines pas de pouces", Ovila Légaré

=== Radio-era songs ===
- "(There's a) Bluebird on Your Windowsill", Elizabeth Clarke
- "Deux enfants du même âge", Germaine Dugas

=== Modern era performers and songs ===
The rock group Rush (Geddy Lee, Alex Lifeson and Neil Peart) was inducted in 2010 as were several of its songs:

- "Closer to the Heart" by Rush and Peter Talbot
- "Limelight" by Rush
- "The Spirit of Radio" by Rush
- "Subdivisions" by Rush
- "Tom Sawyer" by Rush and Pye Dubois

Francophone singer Robert Charlebois was also declared a modern era inductee, as was some of his songs:

- "Demain l'hiver" by Charlebois
- "Fu Man Chu" by Charlebois, Claude Gagnon, Marcel Sabourin
- "Les ailes d'un ange" by Charlebois
- "Lindberg" by Charlebois, Claude Péloquin, Louise Forestier and Pierre F. Brault
- "Ordinaire" by Charlebois and Claudette Monfette

Two songs neither related to Charlebois nor Rush were also inducted into the Hall of Fame:

- "The Hockey Theme", Dolores Claman
- "J'entends frapper", Michel Pagliaro

== Inductees ==
=== Songwriters ===
- Bryan Adams
- Paul Anka
- Randy Bachman
- Roméo Beaudry
- Blue Rodeo
- Mary Travers Bolduc
- Shelton Brooks
- Alfred Bryan
- Édith Butler
- John Capek
- Wilf Carter
- Robert Charlebois
- Tom Cochrane
- Bruce Cockburn
- Leonard Cohen
- François Cousineau
- Burton Cummings
- Lionel Daunais
- Serge Deyglun
- Beau Dommage
- Claude Dubois
- Pye Dubois
- Willie Eckstein
- Raymond Egan
- Jean-Pierre Ferland
- Feist
- David Foster
- Myles Goodwyn
- Harmonium
- Bill Henderson
- Dan Hill
- Ron Hynes
- Marc Jordan
- Andy Kim
- Alex Kramer
- Daniel Lavoie
- Félix Leclerc
- André Lejeune
- Sylvain Lelièvre
- Pierre Létourneau
- Claude Léveillée
- Raymond Lévesque
- Gordon Lightfoot
- Lighthouse
- Carmen Lombardo
- Loverboy
- Rita MacNeil
- Marjo
- Anna McGarrigle
- Kate McGarrigle
- Loreena McKennitt
- Sarah McLachlan
- Murray McLauchlan
- Jean Millaire
- Joni Mitchell
- Kim Mitchell
- Alanis Morissette
- Bob Nolan
- Michel Pagliaro
- Christian Péloquin
- Paul Piché
- Luc Plamondon
- Francine Raymond
- Michel Rivard
- Robbie Robertson
- Stan Rogers
- Rush
- Eddie Schwartz
- Jack Scott
- Richard Séguin
- Jane Siberry
- Hank Snow
- John Stromberg
- Diane Tell
- Ian Thomas
- Triumph
- The Tragically Hip
- Ian Tyson
- Sylvia Tyson
- Jim Vallance
- Gino Vannelli
- Stéphane Venne
- Gilles Vigneault
- Florent Vollant
- Roch Voisine
- Neil Young

=== Special achievement ===
People who were not principally known as songwriters, but were inducted due to their importance in Canadian music history.

- Marius Barbeau
- Herbert Samuel Berliner
- Henry Burr
- Helen Creighton
- Frank Davies
- Yvan Dufresne
- Lucille Dumont
- Edith Fowke
- Ernest Gagnon
- Sam Gesser
- Walt Grealis
- Pierre Juneau
- Stan Klees
- Guy Latraverse
- Edward B. Moogk
- Anne Murray
- Oscar Peterson

=== Songs ===
==== A-H ====
- (Make Me Do) Anything You Want
- À Québec au clair de lune
- Les ailes d'un ange
- Aimes-tu la vie comme moi?
- Aimons-nous
- Ain't No Cure for Love
- Ain't We Got Fun?
- Ain't Nobody Here but Us Chickens
- American Woman
- Aquarius
- Artistes
- As the Years Go By
- Big Yellow Taxi
- Big Wheels
- Bird on the Wire
- Black Fly Song
- Bleu et blanc
- Bluebird on Your Windowsill
- Boo Hoo (You've Got Me Crying For You)
- Born to be Wild
- Both Sides Now
- Câline de blues
- Calling Occupants of Interplanetary Craft
- Canadiana Suite
- Un canadien errant
- Candy
- Chante-la ta chanson
- Le ciel se marie avec la mer
- Clap Your Hands
- Closer to the Heart
- Un coin du ciel
- Come Josephine in My Flying Machine
- Comme j'ai toujours envie d'aimer
- Comme un million de gens
- Cool Water
- Dans nos vielles maisons
- The Darktown Strutters' Ball
- Demain l'hiver
- Des croissants de soleil
- Des mitaines pas de pouces
- Deux enfants du même âge
- Diana
- En veillant su'l perron
- Everybody Knows
- The Facts of Life
- Far Away Places
- Farewell to Nova Scotia
- Femme de rêve
- Four Strong Winds
- Frédéric
- Le Frigidaire
- Fu Man Chu
- Gens du pays
- A Guy is a Guy
- Hallelujah
- Hand Me Down World
- Heart Like a Wheel
- Hello, Hooray
- Help Me
- The Hockey Song
- The Hockey Theme
- Home For a Rest
- Hot Child in the City
- How About You?
- The Huron Carol
- Hymn to Freedom

==== I-P ====
- I Go Blind
- I Heard the Bluebirds Sing
- I Just Wanna Stop
- I Saw Her Again
- I Would Be The One
- I'm Movin' On
- I's the B'y
- I'll Never Smile Again
- I've Got Everything I Need (Almost)
- If You Could Read My Mind
- Il suffit de peu de choses
- (It Takes) Diff'rent Strokes
- Informer
- It Doesn't Matter Anymore
- It's Raining Men
- J'ai la tête en gigue
- J'entends Frapper
- Je ne suis qu'une chanson
- Je reviens chez nous
- Je suis cool
- K-K-K-Katy
- L'infidèle
- L'âme à la tendresse
- L'adieu du soldat
- La bitt à Tibi
- La Manic
- La maudite machine
- La Parenté
- La vie d'factrie
- Le Frigidaire
- Le Labrador
- Last Night I Had the Strangest Dream
- Last Song
- Le monde a bien changé
- Lest You Forget
- Let Your Backbone Slide
- Limelight
- Lindberg
- Love Child
- Marie-Hélène
- Mille après mille
- Moi, mes souliers
- Mommy Daddy
- Mon pays
- Morning Dew
- My Definition of a Boombastic Jazz Style
- My Heart Cries For You
- My Old Canadian Home
- My Sister and I
- My Swiss Moonlight Lullaby
- My Way
- No Sugar Tonight/New Mother Nature
- No Time
- Les nuits de Montréal
- O Canada
- Oh What a Feeling
- Opportunity
- Ordinaire
- Paper Rosie
- Paquetville
- Pas Besoin de Frapper Pour Entrer
- Peg O' My Heart
- Pendant que
- Peter's Dream
- Le petit roi
- Un peu plus haut, un peu plus loin
- Play Me a Rock and Roll Song
- Pop Goes the World
- Powder Your Face with Sunshine
- Prétends que tu es heureux
- Une promesse
- Put Your Dreams Away (For Another Day)
- Put Your Hand in the Hand
- Put Your Head on My Shoulder

==== Q-T ====
- Quand les hommes vivront d'amour
- Québécois
- The Red River Valley
- Le réveil de la nature
- Rise Up
- S'Nice
- The Safety Dance
- She's a Lady
- Si j'avais un char
- Si j'étais un homme
- Si les bateaux
- Signs
- Sing High, Sing Low
- Sleepy Time Gal
- Snowbird
- Some of These Days
- Something to Talk About
- Song For the Mira
- Spinning Wheel
- The Spirit of Radio
- Squid Jiggin' Ground
- Subdivisions
- Sugar, Sugar
- Suzanne
- Sweet City Woman
- Sweethearts on Parade
- Swinging Shepherd Blues
- T'es mon amour, t'es ma maîtresse
- There's a Love Knot in My Lariat
- These Eyes
- This Beat Goes On/Switchin' to Glide
- This Wheel's On Fire
- To Sir With Love
- Tom Sawyer
- Ton Visage
- Le tour de l'île
- Tumbling Tumbleweeds

==== U-Z ====
- Universal Soldier
- Vivre dans la nuit
- Vivre en amour
- We'll Sing in the Sunshine
- What a Friend We Have in Jesus
- What About Love
- When I Die
- When My Baby Smiles at Me
- When You and I Were Young, Maggie
- Wildflower
- Woodstock
- The World is Waiting for the Sunrise
- You Turn Me On, I'm a Radio
- You Were On My Mind

== See also ==
- List of music museums
