= Georges Langford =

Canadian singer-songwriter

- Born: 24 May 1948 (age 78); Pictou, Nova Scotia, Canada
- Occupations: Singer-songwriter, Composer
- Notable work: "Acadiana"

Georges Langford (born 24 May 1948) is a Canadian singer-songwriter and composer.

== Biography ==
Georges Langford was born in Pictou, Nova Scotia, Canada on 24 May 1948, son to René Langford and Régina Richard. He was raised in Havre-aux-Maisons at the Magdalen Islands, then studied at Bathurst in New Brunswick, where he composed his first songs.

In 1965, Langford started his career as a singer-songwriter. He was the first professional Magdalen Islander singer-songwriter. Langford opened boîtes à chansons on the Magdalen Islands, including L'Astrid in 1966 and Le Vieux Quai. He performed in 1968 at the Acadian festival of Caraquet. In 1969 he composed the soundtrack of the film La noce n'est pas finie.

Langford then moved to Montreal and performed in small boîtes à chansons, playing his guitar as accompaniment. At the television show Sous mon toit he performed "Le frigidaire", which would later obtain international success when recorded by Tex Lecor in 1971. This notoriety helped Langford's career, who had multiple successful songs : "Thunder Bay", "Derrière", "Le 15 de mai", "Le péril jaune" and "Allô! la Calypso".

In 1973 he published a collection of poems and songs named Arrangez-vous pour qu'il fasse beau and a first folk rock album with the same title. In 1974 he was the opening act for Louise Forestier at the Place des Arts. He was Radio-Canada's deleguate at the Festival de Spa in 1975 and won the prize for the best new song with "Acadiana".

In the early 1980s, he retired from the musical scene while continuing to compose. In 1981 he became program director at the community radio station of the Magdalen Islands. In 1985, he published L'Anseaux-demoiselles, a chronicle of the Magdalen Islands.

In 1992, he published Le premier voyageur, and on the same year, he won the Jovette-Bernier Prize. In 1993, he was the first recipient of the Rosaire Vigneault Award. In 1994, he became a member of the Congrès Mondial Acadien. In the same year, he won the SOCAN classics award. In 2001, he won the International poetry contest Ronald Gasparic in Romania. He ran the boîte à chansons La Côte at l'Étang-du-Nord in the early 2000s.

He published the album Il n'y a qu'une histoire in 2003, which was named one of ten best Québécois discs of the year by Le Devoir.

In 2015, La Société Nationale de l'Acadie gave him the Léger-Comeau Medal, the highest distinction given by the Acadian people. One year later, he published his collection of poems and songs Un point sur la mer.

== Discography ==
Singles
Year	Title
1973	Thunder Bay / Derrière
1973	La coupe Stanley / Le cowboy dans la lune
1974	Le 15 de mai / La butte
1974	L'écossaise / La femme du président
1975	Acadiana / Le chant du tracteur
1976	Le tour des maisons / Le fond du bassin
1977	Bluenose / Astre propice au marin
1978	Le péril jaune / Allô! la Calypso

Albums
Year	Title
1973	Arrangez-vous pour qu'il fasse beau
1975	Acadiana
1976	Album souvenir
1976	Bluenose
1978	Le chemin des trois maisons
1979	Les grands succès
2003	Il n'y a qu'une histoire
