= Tex Lecor =

Canadian singer, painter and media personality

- Born: Joseph Henri Paul Cyrille Lecorre; June 10, 1933; Saint-Michel-de-Wentworth, Quebec, Canada
- Died: September 8, 2017 (aged 84); Terrebonne, Quebec, Canada
- Occupations: Painter, Host, Singer-Songwriter

Tex Lecor (10 June 1933 – 8 September 2017), real name Paul Lecorre, was a Québécois painter, host and singer-songwriter.

== Biography ==
Joseph Henri Paul Cyrille Lecorre was born in Saint-Michel-de-Wentworth, Quebec, Canada on 10 June 1933 to Henri Lecorre. He was baptized on 16 June.

He left the Laurentides in 1957 for Montreal, where he opened the boîtes à chansons La Poubelle and La Catastrophe. He made his debut in La Poubelle in the late 1950s while studying at the Montreal School of Fine Arts. He used the nickname Tex, which came from his youth manual labor. Tex Lecor then published his first album Complexe de la chanson canayenne with the label London

He obtained success visiting Quebec's clubs and boîtes à chansons with his lumberjack character.

In the mid-1960s, his discs became somewhat popular with "Le dernier des vrais", "Je t'amène avec moi" and "Noël au camp", the latter of which became a classic of the holiday season.

Tex Lecor performed at the Comédie-Canadienne in 1968. He was the star of the movie The Draveur by Van de Water.

He composed "La Bolduc 68" for Marthe Fleurant and "Gogo Trudeau" for the SINNERS.

Lecor was the host of the successful variety show Sous mon toit starting in 1970.

Lecor's adaptation of the song Le frigidaire by Georges Langford was successful internationally. He sung the adaptation in five languages. He published other successful songs in the 1970s: "Rame, rame", "Quand ça ne tourne pas rond", "Ti-bicycle", "Tout l'monde est de bonne humeur" and "Lucille".

He stopped singing in the late 1970s to focus on painting and radio. His radio shows Tex Matinal, Les insolences d'un téléphone and Le festival de l'humour were very successful. His paintings were exhibited in multiple large Canadian cities.

Tex Lecor died on 8 September 2017 in Terrebonne, Quebec from pulmonary complications tied to Legionnaires' disease.

== Discography ==
Singles
Year	Title
1963	Le bal chez Jos Brûlé/Tout ça
1964	McNally/Charlie Lee
1967	Le dernier des vrais/Ti-Loup
1968	Je t’amène avec moi/Noël au camp
1968	Les charpentiers du ciel/Ma truie
1968	Bienvenue chez nous/La ballade du gars brûlé
1968	The Draveur/Les raftmen sont arrivés
1968	La Bolduc 68/Le temps du rock
1968	Salut les hippies/Ton sourire
1969	Ne t’en fais pas trop/Rame, rame
1969	Noël mauve/Nous nous aimerons
1970	Sous mon toit/Mon amour pour vous
1971	Le frigidaire/Quand viendra le temps
1971	Pauvre jeunesse/Big Swede
1972	Il Frigidaire/Prima o poi vedrai
1972	Marilo/Sieur Émile et Von Fitsko
1972	Quand ça n'tourne pas rond/Faut pas s’faire de bile
1973	Sainte-Scholastique Blues/Après la Baie-James
1973	La misère/La chatte à Thibault
1974	Ti-bicycle/Maudit français
1975	J’passe plus en arrière/La théière
1975	Gaston Labrousse/Dans mon shack
1976	Tout le monde est de bonne humeur/Le petit pub de Val-d’Or
1977	Saint-Gérard-de-Kiamika/Tu n’es pas venue
1977	Lucille/La vie, c’est pas con
1977	Si tu t’en vas demain/Instrumental
1978	Le frigidaire/T’as donc des beaux bip-bops
1979	Viens t’en donc/J’me sens fou
1979	Je t’aime encore/Quand on s’ennuie
1985	Noël au camp/Noël au camp

Albums
Year	Title
1960	Complexe de la chanson canayenne
1961	Mes chansons
1963	Le dernier des vrais
1967	Je t’amène avec moi
1969	Le Québécois Tex Lecor
1969	Chansons interdites à la radio et à la télévision
1970	Sous mon toit
1972	Tex Lecor, c’est moi... et lui aussi
1972	Mon monde à vous
1973	Quand je rêve, c’est en couleur
1974	Tex Lecor
1975	Les grands succès de Tex Lecor
1975	Tex: l'album souvenir
1975	Le tout nouveau festival de l'humour
1976?	Mes premières chansons
1977	Le festival de l’humour québécois
1978	Mon plus récent Lecor
1982	En direct de l’Assemblée nationale
1989	Collection souvenir
1990	Collection souvenir
1991	Collection souvenir
