= Willie Eckstein =

William "Willie" Eckstein
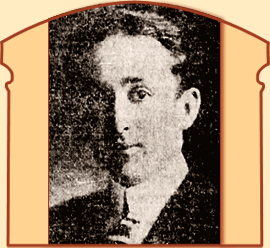
- Willie Eckstein, 21 June 1913

Background information
- Also known as: Boy Paderewski, Mr. Fingers
- Born: 6 December 1888; Montreal, Canada
- Died: 23 September 1963 (aged 74) Montreal, Canada
- Genres: Ragtime
- Occupation(s): Pianist, composer
- Instrument: Piano

William "Willie" Eckstein (6 December 1888 – 23 September 1963), a.k.a. the Boy Paderewski and Mr. Fingers, was a Canadian pianist and composer.

== Life and career ==
William Eckstein was born in Pointe St. Charles, Montreal, Quebec, Canada. It is said that he began showing signs of prodigious musical talent at the early age of 3 when he played by ear the melody to Home! Sweet Home! on the piano after hearing it performed the day before.

At age 6, Eckstein studied with Moretzky Upton of McGill University, and various other music teachers, who taught him piano, theory and harmony, and at age 12 was offered a piano scholarship to the school.

Due to his small stature, standing under 5 feet, Eckstein first attracted attention dressed as a boy performer and billed as the "Swedish Boy Wonder" while employed for the Bell Piano Company at the Canadian National Exhibition. An agent recognized his unique talent and offered him a job playing in New York City. There he was scouted once again and offered a job with the Keith/Albee, Proctor and Orpheum vaudeville circuits. Billed as the "Boy Paderewski", Eckstein toured across Canada, the United States, and Europe. He was even invited to perform for Theodore Roosevelt at the White House.

In 1910, Eckstein returned to Montreal and became an accompanist at the Lyric Music Hall before moving to the Strand Theater in 1912 where he accompanied silent films and was known as "Mr. Fingers". Soon his musical interpretations and original film scores attracted the attention of famous musicians and celebrities alike. Even the great composer Sergei Rachmaninoff upon hearing Eckstein play once commented: "I don't believe it", in regards to his ability. Eckstein also became noted as a ragtime composer; his pieces include Perpetual Rag and Delirious Rag, both co-authored with Harry Thomas.

Following the demise of silent movies brought on by the advent of the talking motion picture or "talkies", Eckstein became a club and broadcast entertainer. He attempted to enlist in the army during the First World War, but was refused because of his height. Instead, he began composing popular and patriotic songs like Goodbye Soldier Boy, You Are My All in All and Goodbye Sunshine, Hello Moon, which enjoyed success in the Ziegfeld Follies. He gave the first live radio performance in North America in 1919. He recorded with Eckstein's Jazz Band (fronted by his brother Jack), the Melody Kings from Montreal, the Willie Eckstein Trio, The Strand Trio and as a solo performer. He was honored in 1959 for his composition "Queen of Canada" for Queen Elizabeth II's Canadian tour.

In May 1963, Eckstein attended an appreciation night held at His Majesty's Theater in his honor but was too sick to perform. Shortly after the concert, he suffered a stroke. He died on 23 September 1963 at the age of 74. The Who's Who of Jazz in Montreal: Ragtime to 1970 by John Gilmour describes him as highly influential on the styles of Canadian pianists Vera Guilaroff, Bob Langlois and Harry Thomas. In 2006, Eckstein was inducted into the Canadian Songwriters Hall of Fame.

== Aftermath ==
As a testament to his legacy, a two-story mural of Eckstein remained on the west wall of the Strand Theater until it was demolished (and is now a store.)

== Select works ==
- "Won't you meet me at Murray's : fox-trot"
- "You are my all in all"
- "In sunny summertime"
- "Good bye sunshine, hello moon!"
- "Beautiful thoughts : a reverie"
- "To the King and Queen : from over there" : "A Toast to the King and Queen" (from over there) by [Harold Moon]
- "Lest you forget" (a song inducted into the Canadian Songwriters Hall of Fame)
- "S'Nice" (also inducted into the CSHF)
- "Valse de luxe"
- "Sunshine trail"
- "I just can't help lovin' 'em all"
