= Lynda Squires =

Canadian pop singer (born 1951)

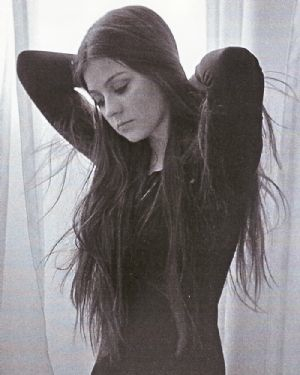

Background information
- Born: January 22, 1951 (age 75)

Lynda Squires (born 22 January 1951) is a Canadian pop singer.

== Family ==
She was born Lynda Margaret Mae Squires. Her mother was Ruth Mullen Squires of Oshawa, Ontario. She married Frank Davies on 1 June 1972.

== Career ==
=== Bands ===
Drummer Bob Bryden and Squires were members of The Christopher Columbus Discovery of New Lands Band in Oshawa, Ontario during 1967. The unit split up in 1968. Bryden and Squires joined rival band Reign Ghost. Soon the bassist left and Bryden recruited former Columbus bassist Joe Gallant. After creative differences Gallant quit and Columbus' Jerry Dufek joined. This line-up signed with Jack Boswell's Allied Records. The recorded the self-titled Reign Ghost album in late 1968 for release in January 1969. However, the band soon broke up. Bryden and Squires Reign Ghost, joining with drummer Rich Richter and bassist Russ Erman. Allied offered to release a follow-up album Reign Ghost Featuring Lynda Squires, but before the album could be released, the new band split up.

=== HAIR ===
Lynda Squires joined the 1969 Canadian cast of Hair, as one of the first cast members of the widely acclaimed Toronto "Mississauga Tribe" at The Royal Alexandra Theatre.

== Gallery ==
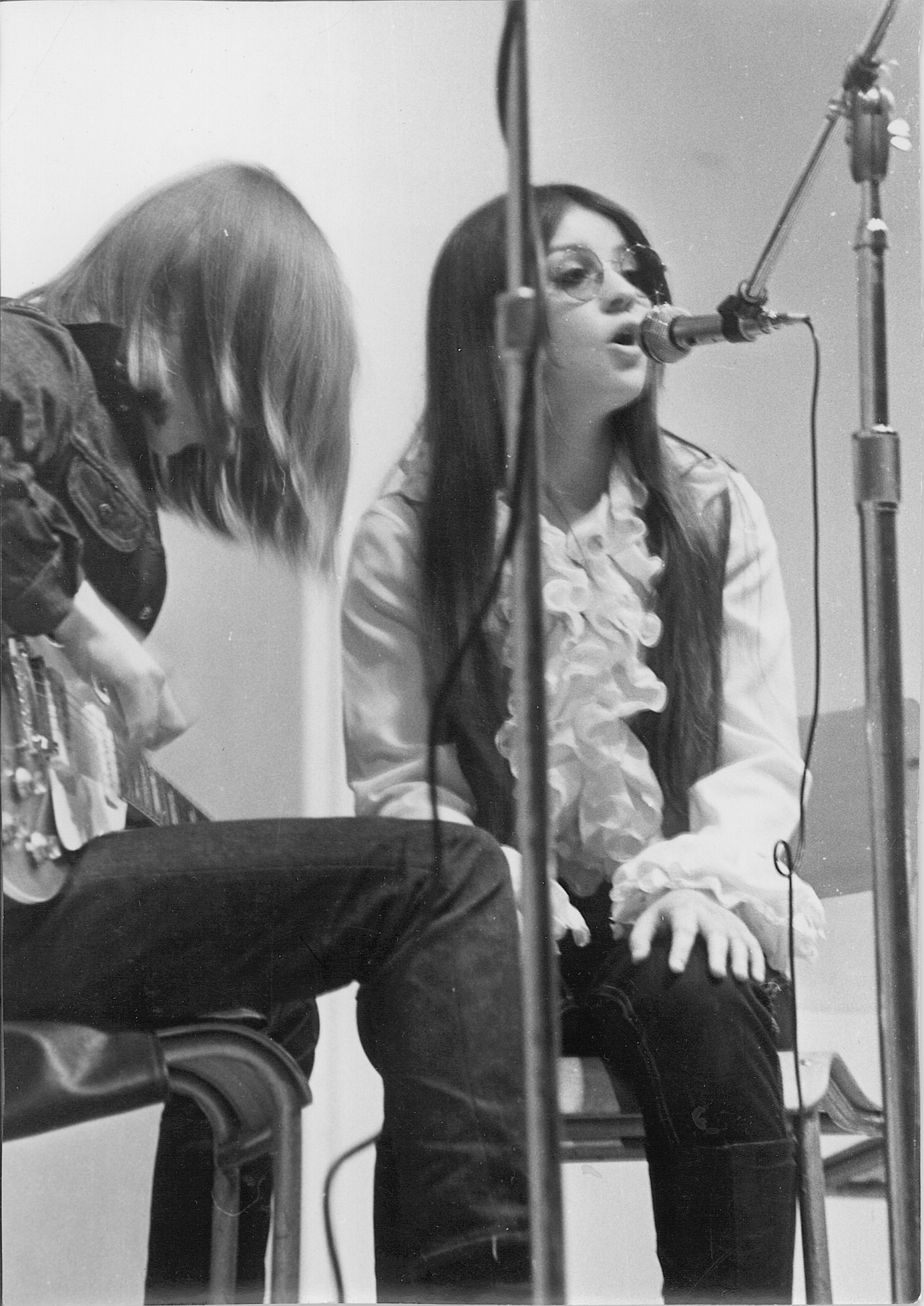
photo of Lynda Squires, Canadian pop singer

== Discography ==
=== Singles ===
1970 Long Day Journey/Pudsy's Parable (Paragon)

=== Albums ===
- 1969 Reign Ghost (Allied)
- 1970 Reign Ghost Featuring Lynda Squires (Paragon)
- 1991 Reign Ghost [2-fer-1 CD re-issue] (Laser's Edge - US)
