= Marc Gélinas =

Canadian musician (1937–2001)

- Born: Joseph Édouard Yves André Marc Gélinas; November 28, 1937; Montreal, Quebec, Canada
- Died: October 2, 2001 (aged 63); Sainte-Agathe, Quebec, Canada
- Occupations: Singer-songwriter, Composer, Actor, Screenwriter
- Father: Gérard Gélinas
- Awards: Great Prize of the Canadian disc (CKAC); Various awards (Festival du disque); Léo-Le Sieur prize Silvey Key (CBC national competition)

Marc Gélinas (28 November 1937 – 2 October 2001) was a Canadian singer-songwriter, composer, actor and screenwriter from Quebec.

== Biography ==
Joseph Édouard Yves André Marc Gélinas was born in Montreal, Quebec, Canada on 28 November 1937 to Gérard Gélinas, a bass singer.

Gélinas started writing songs when he was fourteen, but initially sang those of Francis Lemarque and Joseph Kosma. In 1954–1955, he studied singing at the Music Conservatory of Montreal. Gélinas's career started in acting, starring in the soap opera Beau temps, mauvais temps in 1955. He starred in Nérée Tousignant in 1956 and Médée.

His debut as a singer was singing Boucles blondes on the show Rendez-vous avec Michelle in 1955. His first album won the Great Prize of the Canadian disc of CKAC in 1958. He started performing at boîtes à chansons, cabarets and various variety shows. Starting in the 1960s, Gélinas wrote songs for other authors.

He starred in the TV shows En quête de chansons (1960–1961), Sur deux notes (1961–1962) and Une semaine avec...(1962) and Musique en tête (1962). He was also host at the cabaret Le Cochon borgne.

He left the forestage in 1962, but returned in 1965 with Moïra and De vie à éternité, the latter of which earnt him the trophy of best singer-songwriter at the Festival du disque. In 1966 the Festival du disque gave him the prize for best chansonnier-style performer for his album "Ça c'est du Gélinas", of the best pop song for Tu te souviendras de moi and of the most popular chansonnier. He also won the Léo-Le Sieur prize for best Canadian pop song for Tu te souviendras de moi.

He wrote three songs for the Expo 67: Rendez-vous à Montréal, La Ronde and Lorsque le rideau tombe.

In 1968, Gélinas was named the most popular singer of the year by the Festival du disque, and was Radio-Canada's delegate at the international contest Chansons sur mesure at Brussels and at the International pop song festival of Rio de Janeiro. The next year, he won a Festival du disque prize for his album's quality. He was also named chansonnier of the year at the Gala des artistes.

In 1970, Gélinas hosted Le rideau s'ouvre. He won the Silver Key for Un amour in the CBC national competition. He quit his singing career to focus on his singing school (which he headed until 1974), his disc label, films, variety shows and commercials.

In the early 1980s, Gélinas returned to acting. He mostly acted in theatre, but also in television and cinema.

In 1988, he published a novel with autobiographical tones, Je voudrais bien être pute... mais j'ai pas de clients.

In the 1990s, he gave occasional concerts.

Marc Gélinas died on 2 October 2001 in Sainte-Agathe, Quebec, Canada from liver cancer.

== Discography ==
Singles
Year	Title
1957	Aide-toi et le ciel t'aidera/Le bossu
1957	Boucles blondes/La route
1957	Dors mon chéri/Les langues longues
1958	Numéro de chance/Petite couventine
1958	La chanson des petits poissons/Mon chien et moi
1960	Christine/Quand on parle d'amour
1960	Isabelle/Pardonne-moi
1960	Personnalité/Linda
1961	Un p'tit béguin/La maisonnette
1964	Quitte-moi doucement/J'aime toutes les filles
1965	Moïra/Toi, moi, pour quand
1965	De vie à éternité/Cheveux bruns, têtes blondes
1966	Tu te souviendras de moi/Comme si
1966	Avec les anges/D’ici à Monaco
1966	Le bateau de minuit/Approche
1966	Mon vieil amour/Mon vieil amour
1967	Rendez-vous à Montréal/Fais ta valise
1967	La Ronde/À Baie-Jolie
1967	La Ronde (English version)/Rendez-vous In Montréal (English version)
1967	Lorsque le rideau tombe/Le week-end
1967	À Noël, tu reviendras/La panoplie
1968	Une fille/La Guadeloupe
1968	Quel merveilleux dimanche/Ils étaient deux
1968	En suivant l’étoile/Vivre pour vivre
1969	J’ai du bon feu/L’aventure
1969	Adieu chérie, adieu doudou/La solitude
1969	Joli novembre/Dimanche triste
1969	La solitude/Sais-tu bien comment va ta vie
1969	Les Expos sont là/Instrumental
1969	The Expos’ Song/Instrumental
1969	C’est parce que/Innocence d’Isabelle
1969	Festival western de Saint-Tite/Jonathan City
1970	Avec une chanson/Consuelo
1970	Un amour/Salut les amis
1970	Les jeux du Québec/Instrumental
1970	En motoneige/Par la fenêtre
1971	Mommy Daddy/Instrumental
1972	Encore une fois/Mon chien
1974	Le vendredi, c’toujours pareil/Ramène-moi Sylvie
1983	Le centenaire de 40 ans/La musique

Albums
Year	Title
1957	Marc Gélinas chante pour toi
1958	2e Festival de la chanson canadienne
1961?	Succès du mois, volume 5
1964	Au Cochon borgne avec les indépendantistes
1965	Ça c’est du Gélinas
1966	Trois fois bravo
1968	Lorsque le rideau tombe
1968	Mes premières chansons
1968	Succès souvenirs
1969	Marc Gélinas
1971	Tiens-toi bien après les oreilles à papa
1971	Les grands succès de Marc Gélinas
1973	La Ronde

== Filmography ==
Films
Year	Title	Role
1971	Les mâles	
1975	Tout feu, tout femme	André
1980	Suzanne	Greasy Spoon Owner
1981	The Plouffe Family	Jos Bonefon
1983	Au clair de la lune	Quilleur
1983	Lucien Brouillard	
1984	Sonatine	Bus driver who replaced Fernand
1990	Une histoire inventée	Gros Pierre
1992	Requiem for a Handsome Bastard	Lastic Choquette
1994	Mouvements du désir	Big man
1994	A Wind from Wyoming	Assourhampel
1996	L'homme perché	Agent Léo Petit
1998	Le coeur au poing	
1999	Histoires d'hiver	Monsieur Girouard
2000	Maelstrom	Stranger in subway

TV Series
Year	Title	Role
1955-1958	Beau temps, mauvais temps	Roger Pigeon
1968	Moi et l'autre	
1984	Poivre et sel	Conrad Leboeuf
1989	Lance et compte III	Henri Gendron
1989	Blue la magnifique	Bar boss
1990	Avec un grand A	Barman
1990	La misère des riches	Antoine
1991	Les filles de Caleb	Drinker
1992	Scoop	Jean-Marie
1992	Montréal ville ouverte	Dealer
1992	Montréal P.Q.	Gérald Baribault
1994	Jalna	
1994	Les grands procès	Restaurant owner
1995	Une petite fille particulière	Fat man at fair
1998	KM/H	Mechanic
2000	Chartrand et Simonne	Client #2
2001	Avoir su...	Monsieur Giguère

== Bibliography ==
Year	Title
1988	Je voudrais bien être pute... mais j'ai pas de clients
