= Frank Davies (music producer) =

The Honourable Frank Davies
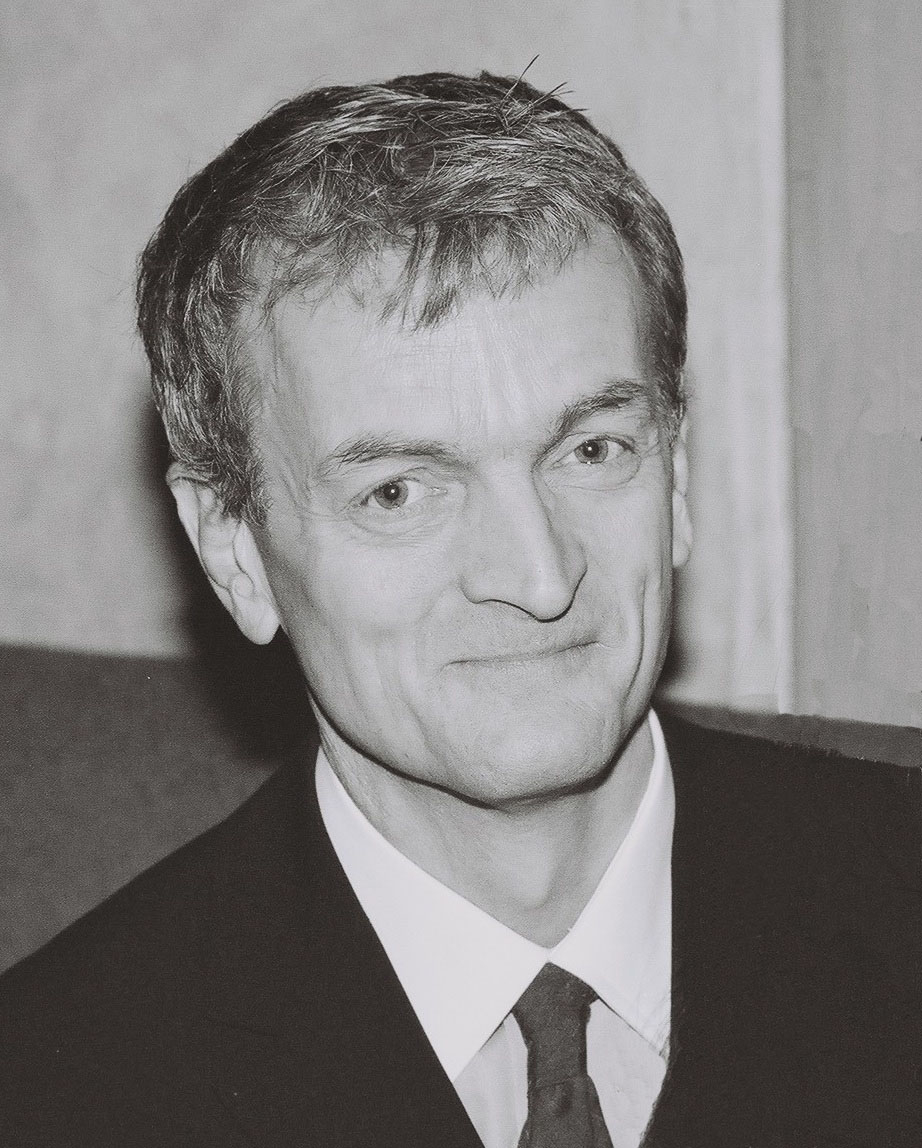

Background information
- Born: Francis William Harding Davies; 22 November 1946 (age 79); Northampton, England
- Occupations: Record producer; publisher
- Years active: 1964–present

Francis William Harding Davies (born November 22, 1946) is a British-born Canadian record producer, music publisher, and founder of the Canadian Songwriters Hall of Fame (Panthéon des Auteurs et Compositeurs Canadiens). Davies has contributed to the growth of Canada's music industry and its creative community for more than four decades. He is credited with discovering, producing, publishing, and developing the careers of many artists and songwriters, and has advocated for their status.

Davies received the Juno Awards 2014 Walt Grealis Special Achievement Award, recognizing individuals who have made a significant impact on the Canadian music industry.

== Family and early life ==
Born in Northampton, England, to British politician The Right Honourable John Davies and The Right Honourable The Lady Vera Georgina Harding-Davies, the young Davies was educated at Windlesham House School near Brighton, Pangbourne College, and Strasbourg University, in north-east France. On June 1, 1972, he married the Canadian pop singer Lynda Squires, daughter of Ruth Mullen Squires. The marriage produced three children: Meghan Mae Harding Davies, now Ehrensperger; Emily Gwyneth Emerson Davies-Cohen; and Kate Theresa Georgina Davies.

== Boards Served in Canada ==
- Chairman, Canadian Songwriters Hall of Fame (CSHF) 2000-2004
- Ontario Media Development Corporation (OMDC) 2001-02
- Founding Member, Canadian Independent Record Production Association (CIRPA) 1970
- Vice-president & Trustee, Canadian Academy of Recording Arts & Sciences (CARAS) 1983-90
- Chairman, The SOCAN Foundation 1990-97
- Foundation to Assist Canadian Talent on Record (FACTOR) 1985-88
- Society of Composers, Authors & Music Publishers (SOCAN) 1990-99
- Performing Rights Organization of Canada (PROCAN) 1983-89
- Music Promotion Foundation (MPF) 1985-90
- Executive Committee - Canadian Music Publishers Association (CMPA) 1982-2000
- Chairman, Canadian Musical Reproduction Rights Agency (CMRRA) 1982-2000

== Awards ==
- Canadian Songwriters Hall of Fame (CSHF) Special Achievement Award (2005)
- SOCAN Society of Composers, Authors & Music Publishers of Canada Special Achievement Award (2004)
- CARAS Canadian Academy of Recording Arts and Sciences Dedicated Service Award (1993)
- Juno Award Dedicated Service Award (1990)
- Marquee Magazine - named one of the "Top 30: Canadian Music's Power Brokers"
- PROCAN - Dedicated Service Award (1990)
- The Record - 'Music Publisher of the Year' (1990)
- The Record - 'Music Publisher of the Year' (1989)
- Record World Magazine (US) - Gold Label Award (1977)

== Bibliography ==
- Hon. Francis William Harding Davies in Canadian Who's Who, Vol. XLI (University of Toronto Press, 2006)
