= Sylvain Lelièvre =

Canadian singer-songwriter

- Born: February 7, 1943; Limoilou, Quebec City, Quebec, Canada
- Died: April 30, 2002 (aged 59); Lévis, Quebec, Canada
- Education: Université de Laval
- Occupations: Singer-songwriter, Composer, Poet
- Website: https://sylvainlelievre.com/

Sylvain Lelièvre (7 February 1943 – 30 April 2002) was a Canadian singer-songwriter, composer and poet from Quebec.

== Biography ==
Sylvain Lelièvre was born on 7 February 1943 in Limoilou, Quebec City, Quebec, Canada, second of four children born from Roland Lelièvre, a journalist, and Marie-Ange Hawey, an actress.

Lelièvre first studied architecture, then studied the humanities (writing) at the Université Laval from 1963 to 1966. He started performing in boîtes à chansons in the early 1960s and met Gilles Vigneault, who became his mentor.

In 1962 he participated in the contest Chansons sur mesure and won a prize for "Après l'hiver", performed by Aimé Major. He won the contest's international finale in 1963 with Les amours anciennes, performed by Monique Leyrac. Over the following years, Lelièvre continued occasionally performing in boîtes à chansons and was a piano accompanist for other artists. In 1966, Renée Claude recorded Lelièvre's compositions "Chanson du bord de l'eau" and "Quand le soir descend". He thus launched his career as a professional singer-songwriter.

In 1968 Lelièvre moved to Montreal. In summer of the same year, he hosted the radio show D'un chansonnier à l’autre. He became a French teacher at Collège de Maisonneuve and there founded a songs workshop that he led for multiple years. It was the first course on Quebec chanson. He continued singing in boîtes à chansons; notably at Chez Clairette and Le Patriote.

In 1971, Lelièvre recorded his first album on Gilles Vigneault's label, Le Nordet. In 1975, Lelièvre encouraged one of his students, Fabienne Thibault, to participate in Chant’Août - thus launching her career. Lelièvre gave a mini-recital at the same festival. In 1976, he composed the musical Les héros de mon enfance based on a booklet by Michel Tremblay.

Lelièvre drew the wider public's interest with songs such as "Marie-Hélène", "Programme double", "Drôle de pays", "Le chanteur indigène", "Lettre de Toronto" and "Moman est là". In 1980, he participated at the Festival de poésie in Paris. He published the major album Venir au monde in 1981. He was the opening show of the Festival d'été de Québec (1982), then participated at Printemps de Bourges (1983) and sung at the Théâtre de la Ville (1984).

Lelièvre became the first recipient of the Jacques-Blanchet medal in 1983. During the 1980s, his songs "Rock", "Banana Split et Cream Soda", "Le drop-out", "Overdose", "Tu danses trop vite", "Tout ça pour tromper la nuit" and "Je flâne en chemin" were successful. He participated in the 1988 Festival de la chanson québécoise at Saint-Malo and in the Festival d'Asilah in Morocco.

He wrote songs for Danièle Oddera and worked on the texts of Daniel Lavoie's album Vue sur la mer.

Lelièvre was part of the board of directors of the Société professionnelle des auteurs et des compositeurs du Québec.

Lelièvre published multiple collections of poems and songs: Chansons (1969), Les trottoirs discontinus (1969), Les sept portes (1972) and Entre écrire (1982).

In 1993 and 1998, Lelièvre was invited at the University of Massachusetts for cultural events on French songwriting in the Americas. He produced the music for Marcel Simard's 1993 film Les mots perdus and for the radio series Un fleuve et des gens. He was the guest of honor at the 1996 Salon du livre de Montréal.

He performed at the Festival international de jazz de Montréal in 2000. He performed his last show, Versant Jazz, in 2001.

Sylvain Lelièvre fainted on 28 April 2002 at the Magdalen Islands and was brought back to Montreal. Lelièvre died on 30 April 2002 in Lévis, Quebec, Canada from a severe cerebral gas embolism. Since his death, one park, one playground, two performance halls and three roads were named in his honor.

His song "Marie-Hélène" was inducted in the Canadian Songwriters Hall of Fame in 2015.

== Discography ==
Singles
Year	Title
1974	Toute nue / Petit moulin
1975	J’ai perdu trop de temps / Le blues du courrier
1975	Old Orchard / Petit matin
1978	Lettre de Toronto / Poucet et Chaperon
1979	Moman est là / Provisoirement
1980	Marie-Hélène / Toi l’ami
1981	Dans le métro / Clandestins
1981	La règle du jeu / Le croque-mort à coulisse
1983	Rock, Banana Split et Cream Soda / La corde de la
1983	Le drop-out
1985	Overdose / Instrumental
1985	Tu danses trop vite / Instrumental
1986	La lune grise
1986	Lignes de coeur / La clé du piano
1989	Tôt ou tard / Instrumental
1989	Au milieu de nous deux / Instrumental
1990	Tout ça pour tromper l’ennui / Instrumental
1990	Je flâne en chemin / Instrumental

Albums
Year	Title
1971	Sylvain Lelièvre
1975	Petit matin
1976	Programme double
1978	Sylvain Lelièvre
1979	Intersection
1980	Sylvain Lelièvre: 13
1981	Venir au monde
1983	À frais virés
1985	Les yeux de la faim
1986	Lignes de cœur
1989	Un aller simple
1991	Sylvain Lelièvre : ses plus belles chansons
