= Vera Guilaroff =

Canadian composer and pianist

Vera Guilaroff (26 October 1902 – 23 October 1976) was a Canadian composer and pianist. She was responsible for the first jazz record by a Canadian woman.

Guilaroff began her career as a pianist for silent film screenings. She performed with Willie Eckstein and broadcast music under the name "Princess of the Radio". She toured the US with her husband, percussionist Harry Raginsky in the 1920s, and in the 1930s broadcast as "Canada's Melody Girl" with the BBC. After the Second World War she largely withdrew from performing to focus on composition.
