= Wentworth-Nord =

- Municipality
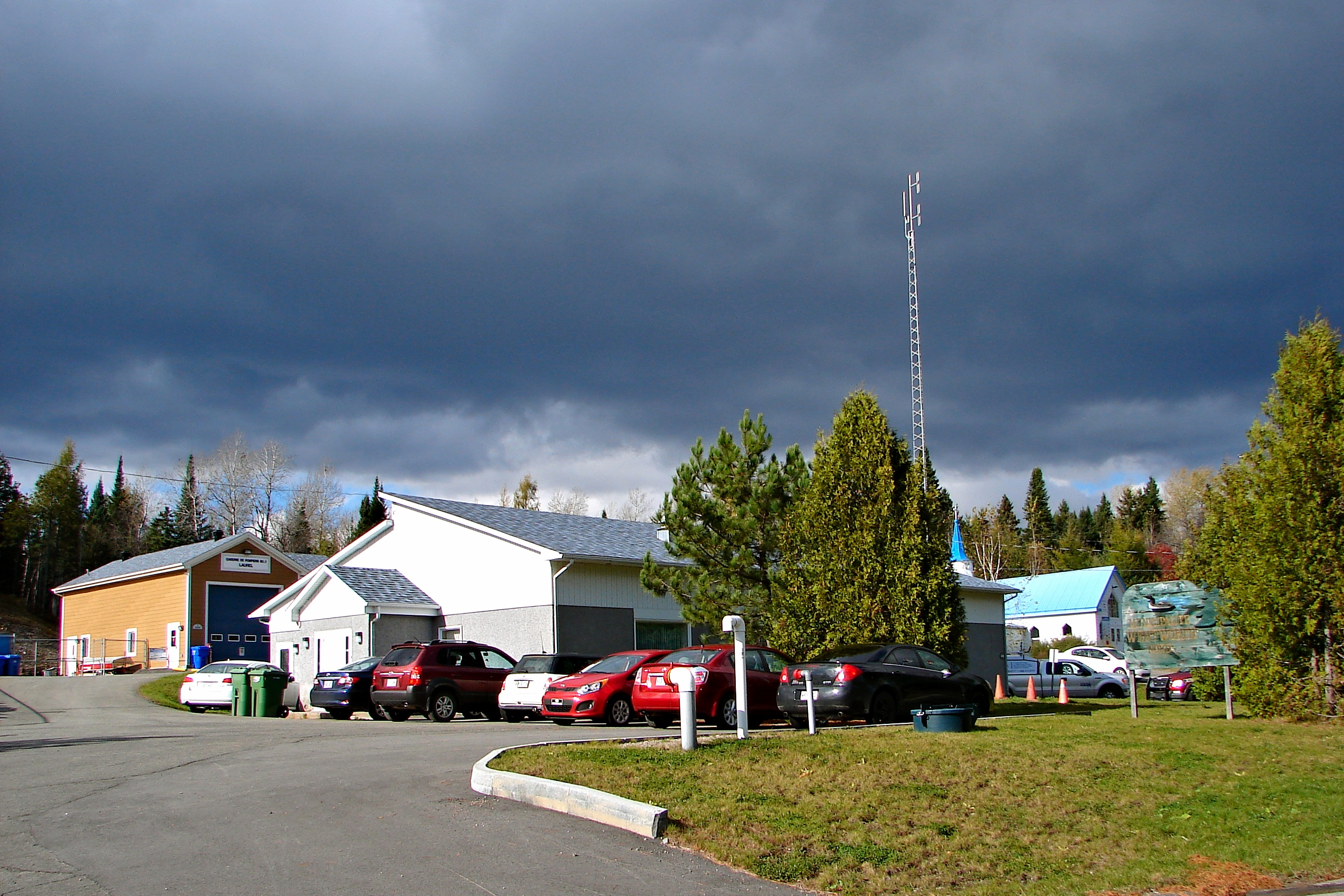
- Laurel

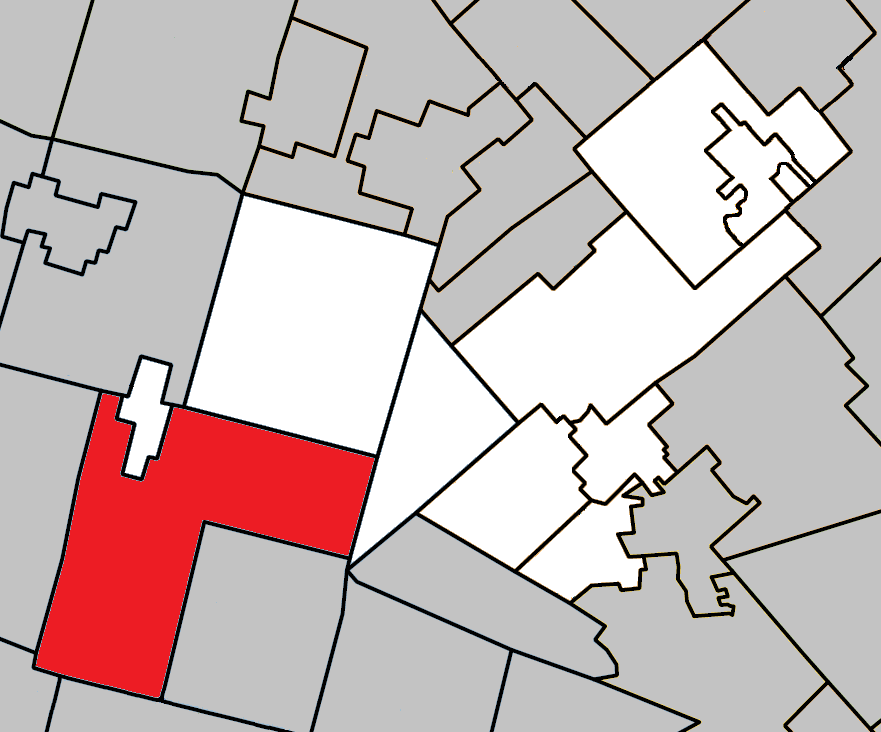
- Location within Les Pays-d'en-Haut RCM

- Location in central Quebec
- Coordinates: 45°51′N 74°27′W
- Country: Canada
- Province: Quebec
- Region: Laurentides
- RCM: Les Pays-d'en-Haut
- Settled: 1855
- Constituted: January 1, 1958

Government
  - Mayor: Karine Dostie
  - Fed. riding: Les Pays-d'en-Haut
  - Prov. riding: Argenteuil

Area
  - Total: 171.1 km^{2} (66.1 sq mi)
  - Land: 152.87 km^{2} (59.02 sq mi)

Population (2021)
  - Total: 1,672
  - Density: 10.9/km^{2} (28/sq mi)
  - Pop (2016–21): ▲22.9%
  - Dwellings: 1,968
- Time zone: UTC−5 (EST)
  - Summer (DST): UTC−4 (EDT)
- Postal code(s): J0T 1Y0
- Area codes: 450 and 579
- Website: wentworth-nord.ca

Wentworth-Nord (French for North Wentworth) is a municipality in the Laurentides region of Quebec, Canada, part of the Les Pays-d'en-Haut Regional County Municipality.

Its communities include Saint-Michel, Laurel, and Montfort. Its many lakes attract many cottage vacationers each summer.

== History ==
The original Wentworth Township, formed in 1809, included both Wentworth and Wentworth-Nord, so their histories are closely related until 1958 when Wentworth-Nord became a separate municipality.

The community of Laurel formed when the first families arrived from Ireland between 1855 and 1860, calling it New Ireland in memory of their homeland. The Laurel Post Office opened in 1886. In 1856, the mission of Wentworth was established, officially renamed to Saint-Michel in 1884. By 1860, McCluskey or McClosky Court opened, probably named after pioneer James McClosky.

From 1899, several mines were commercially exploited, extracting mica (from 1899 onward), chalk (from 1919 to 1923), marl, and graphite. Other economic activity included logging, agriculture, and the manufacture of potash.

== Geography ==
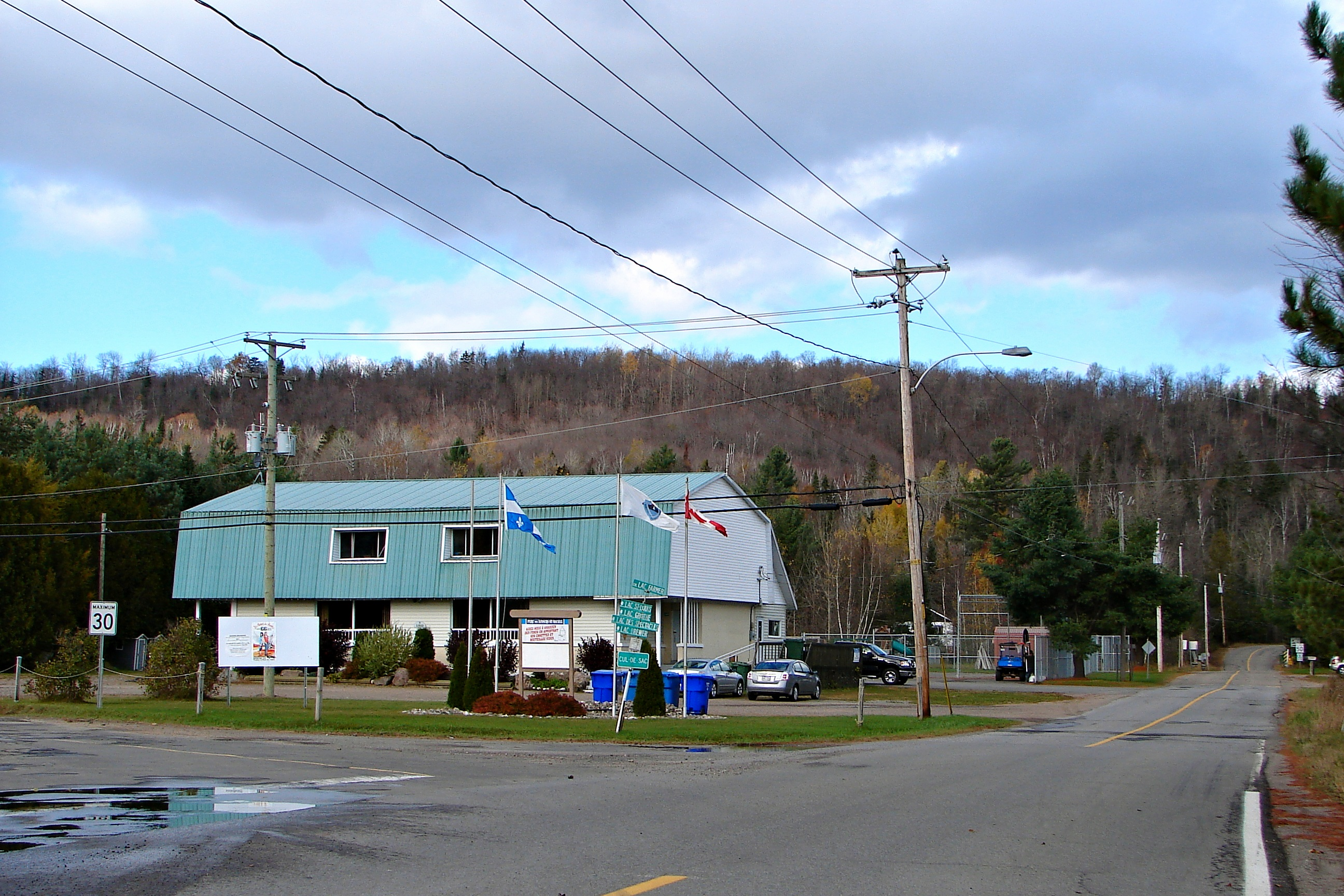
St-Michel-de-Wentworth

Wentworth-Nord is composed of three small towns: Montfort, Laurel, and Saint Michel-de-Wentworth. The largest of these is Laurel, which contains the Town Hall and other major municipal and civic installations.

The municipality of Wentworth-Nord is largely wooded and mountainous terrain. It is one of two main head waters for the Rivière à Simon (English: Simon River), and has one main river, the Rivière de L'Ouest (English: West River). Both are tributaries of the Rivière du Nord.

=== Lakes ===
A small portion of Lac Louisa is located in Wentworth-Nord, Quebec.

Lac Saint-François-Xavier (74.35889°S 45.88139°E) is believed to have been named after François-Xavier Froideveaux. Work undertaken in 2011 restored the lake's natural shore near the Montfort recreational building.

Other lakes in the municipality include Lac Notre-Dame, Lac Saint-Victor, Fraser Lake, Lac Grothé and Lac Wentworth.

== Demographics ==
Canada census – Wentworth-Nord community profile

	2021	2016	2011
Population	1,672 (+22.9% from 2016)	1,381 (-4.1% from 2011)	1,440 (6.4% from 2006)
Land area	152.87 km^{2} (59.02 sq mi)	156.48 km^{2} (60.42 sq mi)	158.42 km^{2} (61.17 sq mi)
Population density	10.9/km^{2} (28/sq mi)	8.8/km^{2} (23/sq mi)	9.1/km^{2} (24/sq mi)
Median age	59.6 (M: 59.6, F: 59.6)	54.3 (M: 55.0, F: 53.4)	55.8 (M: 56.1, F: 55.6)
Private dwellings	1,968 (total) 896 (occupied)	1,989 (total)	1,958 (total)
Median household income	$61,200	$51,584	$n/a

Notes: 2021 population growth percentage based on revised 2016 count of 1,361.
References: 2021 2016 2011

Historical census populations – Wentworth-Nord, Quebec

Year	Pop.	±%
1961	336	—
1966	344	+2.4%
1971	388	+12.8%
1976	483	+24.5%
1981	521	+7.9%
1986	593	+13.8%
1991	789	+33.1%

Year	Pop.	±%
1996	1,039	+31.7%
2001	1,121	+7.9%
2006	1,353	+20.7%
2011	1,440	+6.4%
2016	1,381	−4.1%
2021	1,672	+21.1%

Source: Statistics Canada

Mother tongue (2021):

- English as first language: 13.7%
- French as first language: 78.5%
- English and French as first language: 2.7%
- Other as first language: 4.5%

== Attractions ==
Wentworth-Nord is known primarily for outdoor oriented activities. It is one of many municipalities that has a section of the Aerobic Corridor passing through its territory. The majority of the tourist activity is located at either one of three camp grounds, or in Montfort at the Pavilion. The main summer activities are hiking, mountain biking, kayaking, and SUP. In the winter they are cross country skiing, fat bike, and snowshoeing. Wentworth-Nord maintains 25 km of trails in the Montfort Sector for recreational use, and the municipality is also home to 9 km of the Aerobic Corridor.

== Government ==
Wentworth-Nord forms part of the federal electoral district of Argenteuil—La Petite-Nation and has been represented by Stéphane Lauzon of the Liberal Party since 2015. Provincially, Wentworth-Nord is part of the Argenteuil electoral district and is represented by Agnès Grondin of the Coalition Avenir Québec since 2018.

Wentworth-Nord federal election results
Year	Liberal		Conservative		Bloc Québécois		New Democratic		Green	
2025	33%	128	30%	114	29%	112	4%	14	2%	8
2021	33%	237	12%	85	38%	275	9%	64	0%	0
2019	34%	227	8%	53	46%	304	5%	32	6%	37
2015	33%	128	12%	46	29%	112	24%	95	3%	11
2011	12%	75	13%	84	27%	173	45%	288	2%	12
2008	24%	143	20%	116	41%	242	12%	73	3%	15
2006	18%	106	23%	131	46%	263	8%	47	5%	26
2004	35%	191	7%	40	48%	265	2%	11	7%	41

Wentworth-Nord provincial election results
Year	CAQ		Liberal		QC solidaire		Parti Québécois	
2022	42%	254	11%	64	11%	67	18%	105
2018	40%	289	19%	136	11%	77	21%	152
2014	17%	117	37%	253	6%	38	39%	267
2012	26%	154	27%	159	4%	24	41%	247

List of former mayors:

- André Genest (2005–2017)
- François Ghali (2017–2021)
- Danielle Desjardins (2021–present)

== Infrastructure ==
=== Fire Department ===
The municipality of Wentworth-Nord has a part-time fire department, the Service Security et Incendie Wentworth-Nord (SSIWWN) that was founded in 1972. The SSIWWN has its force trained as both Fire Fighters and Medical First Responders, allowing them to respond to medical emergencies. The municipality Fire Stations, one located in each of the three towns. Each station is equipped with one custom fire truck and one modified Ford pick up truck as a specialty vehicle (medical emergency, SAR, or extrication.) The department averages approximately 200 calls per year.

=== Special Constables ===
Since June 2020 the Municipality has hired and created a department of Public Security staffed by Special Constables. They enforce municipal by-laws and ensure public order.

== Education ==
The Commission scolaire de la Rivière-du-Nord operates French-language public schools.

- École polyvalente Lavigne in Lachute

The Sir Wilfrid Laurier School Board operates English-language public schools:

- Laurentian Elementary School in Lachute serves most of the town
- Morin Heights Elementary School in Morin-Heights serves some of the town
- Laurentian Regional High School in Lachute

== Notable people ==
- Tex Lecor, singer-songwriter

== See also ==
- List of anglophone communities in Quebec
- List of municipalities in Quebec
