= Raymond Lévesque =

Canadian singer-songwriter (1928–2021)

- Born: October 7, 1928; Montreal, Quebec, Canada
- Died: February 15, 2021 (aged 92) Montreal, Quebec, Canada
- Genres: Pop
- Occupation: Singer-songwriter
- Instruments: Vocals, piano
- Years active: 1940s–1980s

Raymond Lévesque (October 7, 1928 – February 15, 2021) was a Canadian singer-songwriter and poet from Quebec. One of the pioneers of the chansonnier tradition in Quebec, he was best known for writing "Quand les hommes vivront d'amour", one of the most famous pop standards in French-language popular music.

== Early life ==
Lévesque was born in Montreal on October 7, 1928. He learned piano under Rodolphe Mathieu and drama under Madame Audet. Shortly after, he met his wife and they married soon after. Inspired by the work of Charles Trenet, he began writing songs in the 1940s and started performing in various cabarets around Montreal. He had his first significant breakthrough in 1947, when he was invited to perform several of his songs on CKAC radio by Fernand Robidoux.

== Career ==
Lévesque was cohost with Colette Bonheur of the variety series Mes jeunes années on Radio-Canada from 1952 to 1954. He subsequently spent several years living in France, where he recorded for Barclay Records and had his songs recorded by French artists such as Bourvil, Jean Sablon, Cora Vaucaire and Eddie Constantine. During this time he wrote "Quand les hommes vivront d'amour", which was inspired by the contemporaneous Algerian War; first recorded by Constantine, the song has since been recorded and performed by many artists in both France and Canada. Other noted songs he wrote during this era included "Les Trottoirs", "La Vénus à Mimile", "Le Coeur du Bon Dieu" and "Rosemont sous la pluie".

After returning to Quebec in 1959, he took acting roles in several téléromans and hosted the children's television series Coucou, and cofounded a boîte à chansons called Chez Bozo with Jean-Pierre Ferland, Clémence DesRochers, Hervé Brousseau, André Gagnon and Claude Léveillée. In 1968, he also began to write poetry and plays, and became politically active in the Quebec separatist movement.

== Later life ==
Lévesque received a lifetime achievement award from the Prix Félix in 1980. By the mid-1980s, Lévesque had suffered profound hearing loss and was diagnosed as deaf. He abandoned music but continued to write, publishing several further works of poetry, fiction and political satire.

Lévesque was awarded the Prix Denise-Pelletier in 1997. He was named a winner of the Governor General's Performing Arts Award in 2005, but declined the honour due to his sovereignist views.

In 2016, a new song written by Lévesque, titled "Les jours d'amour", was recorded and released by singer Marie-Josée Longchamps. He died on February 15, 2021, in Montreal. He was 92, and had been diagnosed with COVID-19 during the COVID-19 pandemic in Quebec in the time leading up to his death.

== Discography ==
=== Albums ===
- 1962 – Chansons et monologues
- 1965 – Raymond Lévesque à la Butte-à-Mathieu
- 1967 – Après 20 ans
- 1971 – Raymond Lévesque
- 1972 – Qui êtes-vous, Raymond Lévesque?
- 1975 – Raymond Lévesque chante pour les travailleurs
- 1977 – Le p'tit Québec de mon cœur

=== Compilations ===
- 1989 – Collection souvenir
- 1993 – Québec love : Raymond Lévesque
- 1999 – Raymond Lévesque : 50 ans de chansons – Quand les hommes vivront d'amour
- 2005 – Raymond Lévesque – Collection Québec Info Musique

== Bibliography ==
=== Poetry ===
- 1956 – Quand les hommes vivront d'amour
- 1971 – Au fond du chaos
- 1971 – Le malheur n`a pas des bons yeux
- 1974 – On veut rien savoir
- 1977 – Le Temps de parler
- 1981 – Électrochoc
- 1989 – Quand les hommes vivront d'amour II
- 2012 – La nouvelle pensée

=== Plays ===
• 1968-Médée

- 1970 – Bigaouette
- 1974 – Tharèse
- 1980 – On veut savoir
- 1983 – C'est à ton tour mon cher René
- 1986 – Waitress
- 1988 – Deux mille ans après Jésus-Christ

=== Autobiography ===
- 1986 – D'ailleurs et d'ici

=== Novels ===
- 1995 – Ketchup : ou comment refaire le monde
- 2000 – Le petit Lalonde
