= Oh What a Feeling =

Oh What a Feeling may refer to:

== Songs ==
- "Oh What a Feeling" (Change song), from the 1985 album Turn On Your Radio
- "Oh What a Feeling" (Pat Boone song), from the 1960 album This and That
- "Oh What a Feeling" (Shirley Murdock song), from the 1988 album A Woman's Point of View
- "Oh What a Feeling" (Sly and Robbie song), from the 1981 album Sly and Robbie Present Taxi

== Other media ==
- Oh What a Feeling (album), a 1979 studio album by Mavis Staples
- Oh What a Feeling: A Vital Collection of Canadian Music, a 1996 4-CD box set
