= Georges Dor =

Canadian author

Georges Dor (March 10, 1931 – July 24, 2001) was a Canadian author, composer, playwright, singer, poet, translator, and theatrical producer and director.

== Early life ==
Dor was born Georges-Henri Dore in Drummondville into a large family. As a young man he worked in a factory, and studied at the École du Théâtre du Nouveau Monde in Montreal.

== Career ==
Dor undertook a career in radio as a disc jockey and news director. In the 1950s he worked at CHLN in Trois-Rivières. Beginning in 1957, he worked for Radio-Canada where he became a director for the Evening News.

Dor wrote poems for many years; in 1964 he was encouraged by friends to compete in an amateur singing competition. He began singing professionally in early 1965, and released his first album in 1966. One of the songs from this album, his composition "La Manic", whose lyrics were a love letter written by a construction worker on the Manicouagan power project, became the most popular recording ever by a Quebec chansonnier, winning the Felix Leclerc award at the 1968 Festival du Disques. Other songs had similar success, notably "Une boîte à chanson" (A Music Box) and "Pour la musique" (For Music).

He continued to perform as a singer until 1972, and to record until 1978. After that he worked mainly in the theatre and in television, producing and writing plays and téléromans. He also wrote two novels and published several collections of poetry.

== See also ==
- List of Quebec musicians
- Music of Quebec
- Television of Quebec
- Culture of Quebec
