= Pierre Létourneau =

Canadian singer-songwriter

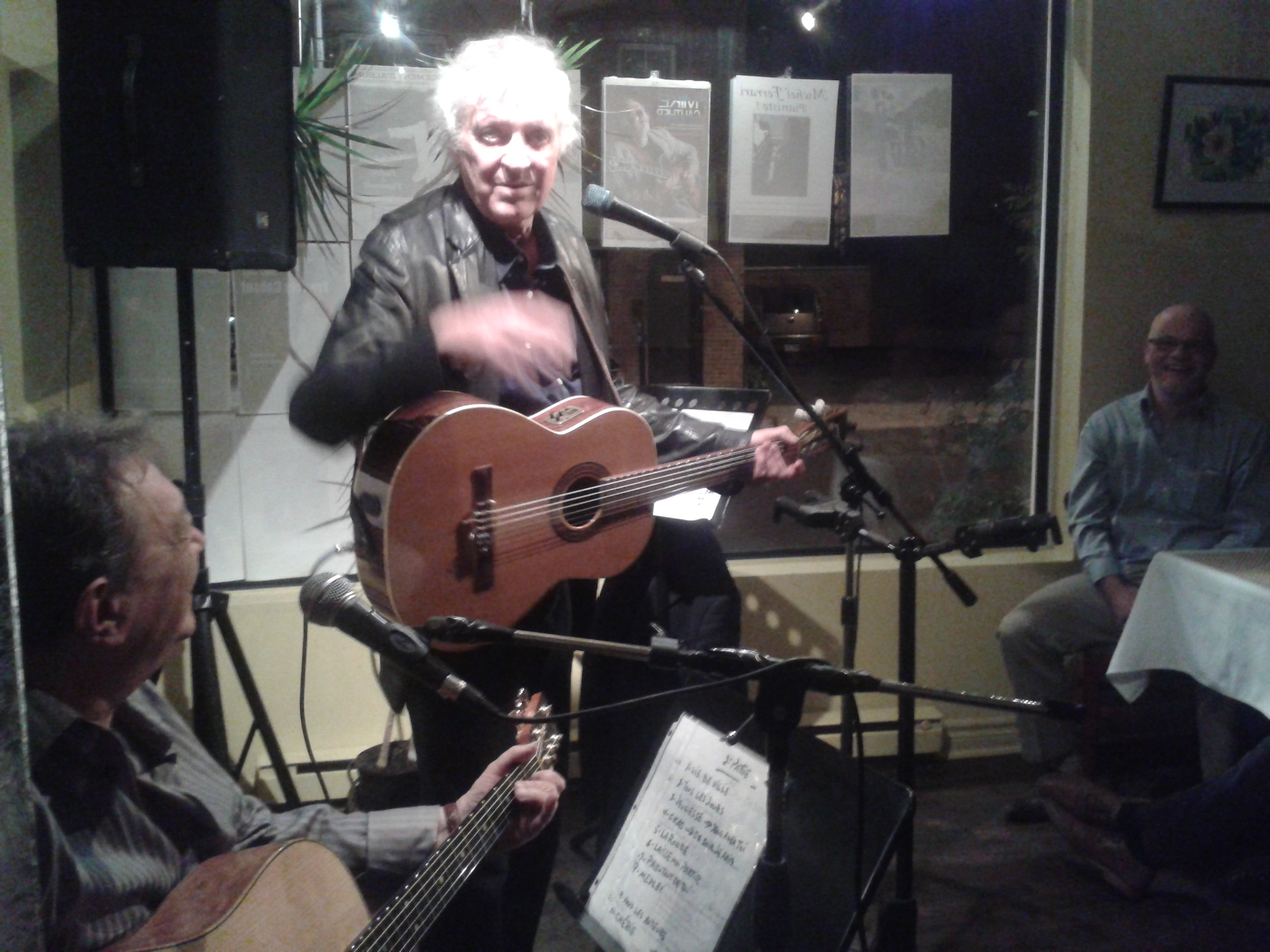
- Born: Joseph Pierre Paul Létourneau; August 11, 1938 (age 88); Verdun, Quebec, Canada
- Education: Université de Montréal
- Occupations: Singer, Songwriter, Actor
- Awards: Canadian Songwriters Hall of Fame; Sylvain-Lelièvre prize Excellency prize (SOCAN); Classics (2) (SOCAN)

Pierre Létourneau (born 11 August 1938) is a Canadian singer-songwriter and actor from Quebec. He is known for the songs Maurice Richard and Tous les jours de la semaine.

== Biography ==
Joseph Pierre Paul Létourneau was born on 11 August 1938 in Verdun, Quebec, Canada to Charles Létourneau, a mechanic, and Beaudry.

Létourneau studied at the University of Montreal and performed in theatre there.

In 1963 he published his first album. Thanks to its success, he hosted the program La boîte à chanson on Radio-Canada's television station in 1964. He then recorded two albums in which he experimented with different musical genres.

In 1970 he spent a year in France and out of boredom recorded the song Maurice Richard. After returning to Québec, Létourneau wrote Laisse-moi partir and Tout seul au monde for Nicole Martin, La Ronde with and for Marc Gélinas, Oh ma Lili for Michel Stax and Danser danser for Nanette Workman.

In 1973 Létourneau published the song "Tous les jours de la semaine" which would become his greatest success. He hosted weekends "song afternoons" for CKAC and "Pulsion" by Radio-Canada. It was his first collaboration with Germain Gauthier, with whom he wrote many other songs.

In 1980 he wrote Aimer for Véronique Béliveau.

Létourneau returned to the live scene in 1982 after ten years of absence. He usually performed in small venues.

He performed in the 1984 show "Trois fois chantera" with Claude Léveillée and Claude Gauthier across Quebec and New Brunswick. He later participated in Michel Robidoux's "Années-Guitares".

By 1992 Létourneau was one of the most prolific Quebecois singer-songwriter. He had published 140 of his own discs and composed the text or music of hundreds of songs for other authors. In 1992, most Québécois authors had at least one of Létourneau's song in their repertoire.

He participated in Robert Charlebois's show "Il était une fois la boîte à chansons" in 2010 and 2011.

He was inducted in the Canadian Songwriters Hall of Fame in 2011 and two of his songs became Classics of the Society of Composers, Authors and Music Publishers of Canada (SOCAN).

He received the Sylvain-Lelièvre prize from the Société professionnelle des auteurs et compositeurs du Québec in 2014.

He received the Excellency prize at the Gala of the SOCAN in 2015.

== Discography ==
Singles
Year	Title
1962	Les colombes/Percé
1964	La chanson des pissenlits/Les clandestins
1966	J'm'appelle Antoine/Pour ma mélancolie
1967	Quand on a perdu son amour/Les cerfs-volants
1967	La planque à Loulou/C'est fini
1968	Transistor/Je veux t'aimer d'amour
1969	Les cigales/La dame du 5ième étage
1969	L'amour, ça vient sans qu'on y pense/Je t'emmène
1970	Maurice Richard/Tu n'es plus de mon village
1971	Mes amis s'en vont/D'Amsterdam à Calcutta
1972	Deux cent mille douze/Être heureux
1972	Les gens qui attendent l'autobus/En amour
1972	La fleur et le couteau/Shakespeare
~1972	Les gens qui attendent l'autobus/Ailleurs c'est pas plus beau
1973	Tous les jours de la semaine/Je m'ennuie
1973	De l'autre côté de la clôture/ Tomber
1974	Faut pas s'en faire avec ça/Mon frère
1974	Les secrétaires de bureau/L'homme et la chanson
1974	Seul avec toi/Y'a toujours quelqu'un
1975	Bonjour la visite/Comme les enfants
1975	Gonowe/Gonowe (Instrumental)
1978	Quand on ne s'aime plus/Quand on ne s'aime plus (Instrumental)
1985	Plein d'amour/Plein d'amour (Instrumental)

Albums
Year	Title
1963	Pierre Létourneau vol. 1
1964	Pierre Létourneau vol. 2
1965	Pierre Létourneau vol. 3
1966	Pierre Létourneau vol.4
1967	Pierre Létourneau
1969	Pierre Létourneau
1971	Pierre Létourneau
1972	Une bien belle journée
1973	Tous les jours de la semaine
1977	Il faut bien rêver
1979	La vie de ville
1984	Changements de vitesse
1988	Y'a du bonheur
1994	On a tous un rêve fou
1998	J'te dis que c'est vrai
1999	Au temps des boîtes à chanson
2006	Heures de pointe
2012	Foutue société

Compilations
Year	Title
1969	Blow Up sur vos vedettes: Quatre super auteurs compositeurs
1974	4 vedettes
1985	De tous les jours de la semaine à plein d'amour
2000	Rétrospective

== Filmography ==
Films
Year	Title	Role
1962	Alone or with Others (Seul ou avec d'autres)	Pierre
1969	Viens mon amour	
1970	Love in a Four Letter World	Pierre

TV series
Year	Title	Role
1964	Rue de l'Anse	Steve
1971	Paradis perdu	
1992	Scoop	Acolyte de Dumoulin

== Bibliography ==
Year	Title
2003	Le Dialogue du sauveur
2004	Ces mots qu'on utilise... À tort et à travers
2006	J'aimerais bien qu'on te chante
