= Claude Gauthier (singer) =

Canadian singer-songwriter and actor

- Born: January 31, 1939 (age 87); Lac-Saguay, Quebec, Canada
- Occupations: Singer-songwriter, actor

Claude Gauthier (born January 31, 1939) is a Quebec singer-songwriter and actor.

== Biography ==
=== Early years ===
Gauthier grew up in a family that enjoyed and performed music. His father, Almazor Gauthier, sang Sundays in the Catholic Mass and his mother, Antonia Bélisle, played piano. Listening to the classic French singers of the time on radio, such as Edith Piaf and Charles Trenet, inspired him as well. But his musical revelation came when he heard Félix Leclerc for the first time on the radio. From then on, he wanted to ²make music and, like Leclerc, sing simple, direct songs about everyday life.

In 1954 Gauthier moved to Montreal where he worked for three years in the warehouse of the record dealer Édouard Archambault. After that he worked as a wilderness guide.

All during this time he wrote songs and he was soon rewarded for his efforts. Encouraged to take part in a contest for singer-songwriters put on by CKVL, in Montreal, in 1959, he won first prize for "Le Soleil brillera demain" ("the sun will shine tomorrow").

He left his job and started singing in the coffee houses in Montreal accompanying himself on guitar. His songs from this period include: "Ton nom", ("Your Name") and "Le Grand six pieds" ("The Big Six-footer"). "Le Grand six pieds" was a big hit for him. It was based on memories of his early childhood, of the people, their struggle to make ends meet; it was a metaphor for the people of Quebec.

=== First album ===
He was signed up by the Columbia Record company. Gauthier's first album was called Claude Gauthier chante Claude Gauthier (Col FS-531). It included the song "Le Grand six pieds", which earned him the 1961 Grand Prix du disque canadien, awarded by the Montreal radio station CKAC.

He took part in the 1962 Mariposa Folk Festival and in 1964 he sang at Carnegie Hall, New York, where he was warmly received. He shared the stage with Buffy Sainte-Marie, and Peter, Paul, and Mary. Gauthier and Sainte-Marie (who was born in Saskatchewan) exchanged tunes and co-wrote a song together. Sainte-Marie called her version "Until it's time for you to go" and Gauthier entitled his, "T'es pas une autre".

Gauthier's success reached into France as well, and in 1966 he performed in Paris at the Olympia with Gilles Vigneault, Pauline Julien, and Clémence DesRochers. The following year he again appeared at the Olympia this time with Monique Leyrac, Les Jérolas, and Les Feux-Follets.

=== Acting and recording ===
At this time Gauthier started on another career, that of actor. He was the male lead in and wrote music for the film Entre la mer et l'eau douce (1967), which was directed by Michel Brault and starred Geneviève Bujold. The song "Genevieve" which Gauthier wrote for the film was an independent success. He also acted in CBC TV's Septième Nord in 1967.

Gauthier started to record for a new record company, Gamma, a company that was in the process of recording a new generation of performers, such as Louise Forestier, and Robert Charlebois, bringing Gauthier to the awareness of a new generation. Gauthier performed with this outing of new talent at Expo 67. He appeared in the film "Où êtes-vous donc? in 1968.

This period in Gauthier's career was one that brought him to rock and roll and the politics that was in the air at the time. His album Cerfs-Volants (Gamma GS-158) came out in 1968 and won the Festival du disque award. It contained topical songs about world events, such as those that were happening in Vietnam.

During the next few years Gauthier recorded only 45s, but in 1972 his next album came out, Le Plus Beau Voyage (Gamma GS-158). It was recorded in France and it was one of his most successful recordings. A book of the same title containing his lyrics was published in Montreal in 1975.

=== Acting in films ===
Starting in 1973 Gauthier began to act in films. His first effort at this time was in Michel Brault's film Les Ordres (1974). This film has as a background the events of the October crisis of 1970, when the Canadian Parliament promulgated the War Measures Act. In this film Gauthier plays an unemployed father who is arrested during the crisis.

The other films he acted in during this period were: Partis pour la gloire (1975) directed by Clément Perron for which Gauthier also composed the theme song "Les Beaux Instants", which appears on the LP of that name (1975, Presqu'Île PE 7500). And, he also acted in La Piastre (1976) directed by Alain Chartrand.

During the rest of the 1970s Gauthier devoted himself to music, starting with a series of performances at the Outremont Theatre in 1975. He performed at the Festival of French Song in Strasbourg (France) in 1977. His next album, Ça Prend des Racines (1977) — Presqu'île PE-7506 was successful but his singing career slowed down in the following years.

He sang with Félix Leclerc on Leclerc's album My son in 1978, and in 1982 he sang on Fabienne Thibeault's Les chants aimés. He did not put out another album under his own name until 1984's Tendresses.o.s.

Although Gauthier did continue to perform as a singer, he performed only occasionally and often with other musicians, such as the 1985 tour Trois fois chantera with Claude Léveillée and Pierre Létourneau. He also appeared at the Festival de St-Malo (1989). But these efforts were all in the background; his primary focus was on acting.

He appeared in Gilles Carle's La guêpe (1986), François Labonté's Henri (1986), Louise Carré's Qui a tiré sur nos histoires d'amour (1986), Yves Dion's Les Enfants de la rue (1987), Michel Brault's short drama L'Emprise(1988) (once again with Geneviève Bujold), and Robert Ménard's L'Homme de rêve (1991). He also composed the music for Alain Chartrand's film Un homme de parole (1991).

=== First CD ===
Although he took part in the Montreal Francofolies in 1990 and put out his first CD, Planète coeur, in 1991 (Transit TRCD-9101), Gauthier turned his career toward television. He appeared in Arthur Leblanc's Arthur (1991) a documentary about the Acadian violinist Arthur Leblanc. And he also appeared in several Canadian TV series, including Chambres en ville (1989) and Bombardier (1992) a TV mini-series.

In the following years he put out four CDs: L'Agenda (1993, Transit TRCD-9105), Quebec-Love (a compilation, 1994, Gamma GCD-504), Au Temps Des Boîtes à Chansons (recordings made in 1962, and reissued in 1998), and Jardins (1998 — GSI Musique GSIC-989).

In the same year that Jardins came out, Gauthier joined younger musicians, Daniel Boucher, Sabrina Bisson, and Marie-Michele Desrosiers in a concert commemorating the tenth anniversary of the death of Félix Leclerc; the concert was called Le 08-08-88 à 8h08.

In 1999, Gauthier appeared in the critically acclaimed film by Michel Brault, Quand je serai parti... vous vivrez encore (English title: The Long Winter).

=== Award ===
In November 2000 Gauthier received the Prix Hommage of the SOCAN (Society of Composers, Authors and Music Publishers of Canada) for a lifetime of creativity. His 14th album L'homme qui passait par là appeared in March 2001. Following that album a concert performance by the same name (L'homme qui passait par là) was presented at the Corona Theatre in Montreal and also at the Cabaret du Capitole in Quebec City in March 2002. This performance included a string quartet, and host of projections from film archives as well as exceptional dramatic lighting; it underscored Gauthier's 40-year career.

Starting in 2003 a series of retrospective recordings came out, Le plus beau voyage de mes chansons 1959–1972 (GSI Musique GSIC-905) in which Gauthier reinterpreted his previous hits with a new group of musicians. And along with Daniel Boucher, Gauthier appeared in another homage to Félix Leclerc at the Fête nationale du Québec, 2003, at the Parc Maisonneuve, Montreal. Gauthier continues to perform as a singer-songwriter and as an actor.

== Recordings ==
- Claude Gauthier Chante Claude Gauthier (1961) — Columbia FL-284/FS-531 (V)
- Claude Gauthier (1962) — Columbia FL-295/FS-541 (V)
- Claude Gauthier (1965) — Gamma GS-101 (V)
- Claude Gauthier (1967) — Gamma GS-110 (V)
- Cerfs-volants (1969) — Gamma GS-119 (V)
- Le Plus beau voyage (1972) — Gamma GS-158 (V)
- Album-Souvenir (compilation, 1975) — Alta LT-807 (V)
- Les Grands succès de Claude Gauthier (compilation, 1975) — Gamma GS-2-1006 (V), GC2-1006 9 (K7)
- Les beaux instants (performance at the Théâtre Outremont) (1976) — Presqu'île PE-7500 (V), Transit TRCD-9104 (CD)
- Ça prend des racines (1977) — Presqu'île PE-7506 (V)
- TendresseS.O.S. (1984) — Son Hi-Fi C-184 (V)
- Collection souvenir (compilation, 1988) — DMI CS-2-6104 (CD), CS-4-6104 (K)
- Planète Coeur (1991) — Transit TRCD-9101 (CD)
- L'agenda (1993) — Transit TRCD-9105 (CD)
- Québec-Love (compilation, 1994) — Gamma GCD-504 (CD)
- Jardins (1998) — GSI Musique GSIC-989 (CD)
- Au temps des boîtes à chansons (recorded in 1962, published 1998) — Analekta AN2-7012 (CD)
- L'homme qui passait par là (2001) — GSI Musique GSIC-978 (CD)
- Collection souvenir (compilation, 2002) — Gamma AGEK-2365 (CD)
- Le plus beau voyage de mes chansons 1959–1972 (re-recordings, 2003) — GSI Musique GSIC-905 (CD)

== See also ==
- List of Quebec musicians
- Music of Quebec
- Culture of Quebec
