= Boîte à chansons =

Type of music venue in Quebec, Canada

The boîte à chansons is a type of music venue in Quebec. Boîtes à chansons are characterized by their small size, their homely and intimate atmosphere and their rustic decorations. Many singers of Quebec made their debuts in boîtes à chansons. Their golden age was in 1960-1970.

== Description ==
The boîtes à chansons were small venues with a capacity for 50 to 200 people. They were furnished with rustic chairs or logs for seating, tables with checkered tablecloths and holed bricks with candles. The stage was decorated with fishing nets and starfish, and the walls with old tilling devices. Coffee, and rarely liquor, was served.

The boîtes à chansons had an intimate and homely atmosphere. They were outside of the normal entertainment circuits. Students generally composed the audience. They were given creative names according to the venue's characteristics.

There were generally no microphones or amplifiers. Performances would happen twice a night, around 9 PM and 11 PM.

Coffeehouses are in some ways English Canada's equivalent to boîtes à chansons.

== History ==
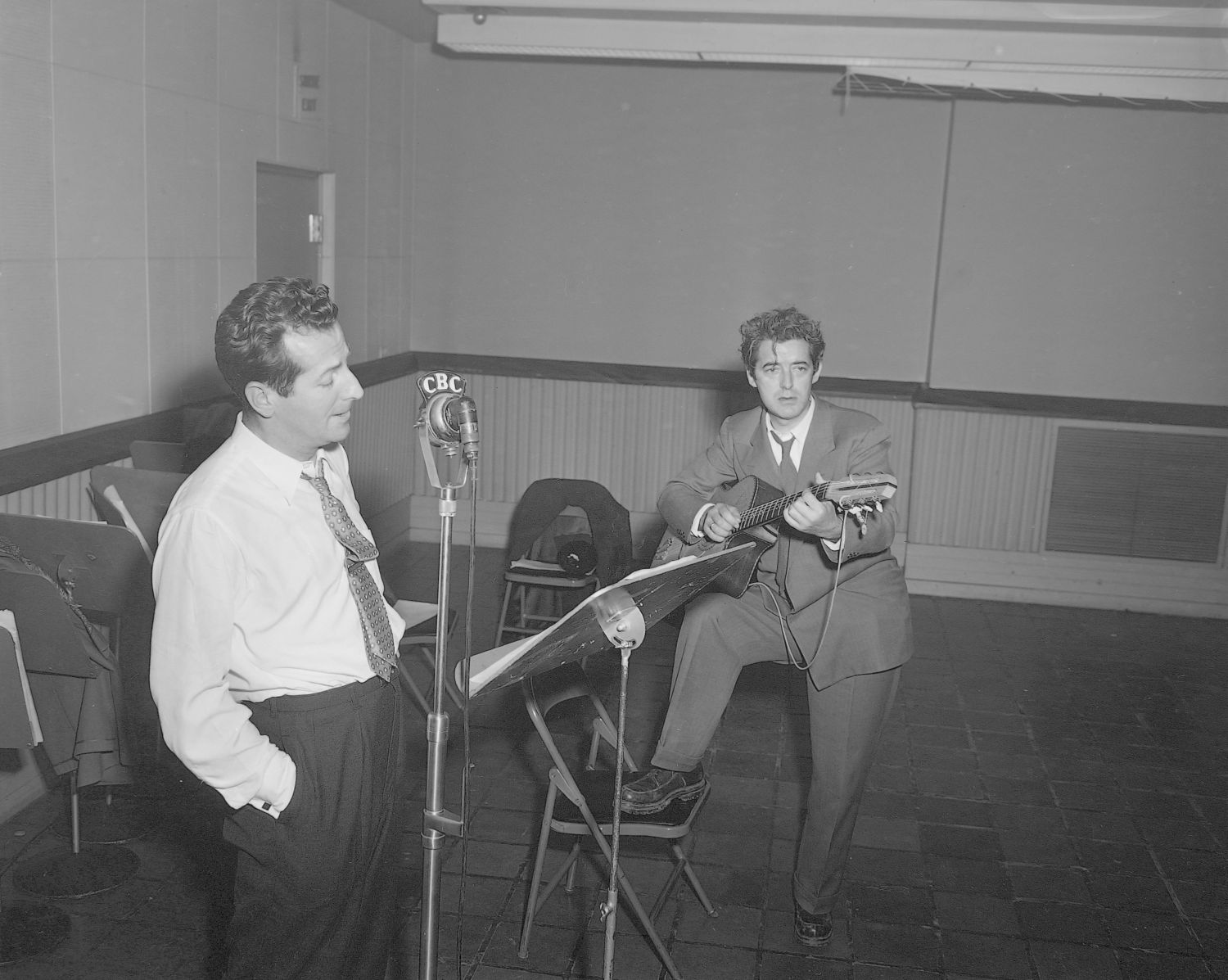
Félix Leclerc and Jean-Pierre Masson on stage at a boîte à chansons

The inventor of the term "boîte à chansons" is disputed, and it's unclear which boîte à chansons opened first. Some propose that nightclub owner François Pilon, who opened a boîte à chansons in the early 1950s, invented the term.

The boîte à chansons' golden era spanned from 1960 to 1970, although some extend this period from 1955 to 1980. The boîte à chansons phenomenon is associated with the Quiet Revolution (1959-1968) : many of its values and ideas were echoed in the boîtes à chansons, like Québec nationalism.

From 1960, prestigious boîtes à chansons like la Boîte à chansons de la porte Saint-Jean and la Butte-à-Mathieu opened. The boîte à chansons movement then spread across the province and large amounts of boîtes à chansons opened across Québec. Although many closed due to unprofitability, others often opened nearby. Schools and parish halls also created their own boîtes à chansons.

The boîtes à chanson allowed young artists to perform their poetry and music to an audience. It is where chansonniers performed. Many artists were discovered in boîtes à chansons, such as Raymond Lévesque, Pierre Létourneau, Claude Gauthier and Gilles Vigneault.

The downfall of the boîtes à chanson was marked by the emergence of Québécois rock. As the chansonniers became stars, they needed larger venues, better sound equipment and better performance fees, and thus left the boîtes à chansons.

Over time, boîtes à chansons' repertoires broadened. It came to include jazz, folk groups, singer-instrumentalists and others.

Boîtes à chansons still exist nowadays.
