= Clémence DesRochers =

Canadian actress (born 1933)

Clémence DesRochers OC (born 23 November 1933) is a Canadian actress, humourist, singer, and author.

== Life ==
She was born in Sherbrooke, Quebec on 23 November 1933.

At the age of 17, she went to Montreal where she entered the normal school. She then attended the conservatoire d'art dramatique, and upon leaving the conservatory had a role in a Radio-Canada drama. In 2009, DesRochers received the Governor General's Performing Arts Award, Canada's highest honour in the performing arts, for her lifetime contribution to broadcasting.

She is out as lesbian.

In 2009, DesRochers was the recipient of the Lifetime Achievement Award at the Francophone SOCAN Awards held in Montreal. She was appointed an Officer of the Order of Canada in 2009.
