= Music of Canada =

The music of Canada reflects the diverse influences that have shaped the country. Indigenous peoples, the British, and the French have all made unique contributions to the musical heritage of Canada. The music has also subsequently been influenced by American culture because of the proximity between the two countries. Since French explorer Samuel de Champlain arrived in 1605 and established the first permanent French settlements at Port Royal and Québec in 1608, the country has produced its own composers, musicians and ensembles.

Canadian music reflects a variety of regional scenes. Government support programs, such as the Canada Music Fund, assist a wide range of musicians and entrepreneurs who create, produce and market original and diverse Canadian music. The Canadian music industry is the sixth-largest in the world, producing internationally renowned composers, musicians and ensembles. Music broadcasting in the country is regulated by the CRTC. The Canadian Academy of Recording Arts and Sciences presents Canada's music industry awards, the Juno Awards, which were first awarded in 1970. The Canadian Music Hall of Fame, established in 1976, honours Canadian musicians for their lifetime achievements.

Patriotic music in Canada dates back over 200 years as a distinct category from British patriotism, preceding Canadian Confederation by over 50 years. The earliest work of patriotic music in Canada, "The Bold Canadian", was written in 1812. The national anthem, "O Canada", was originally commissioned by the lieutenant governor of Quebec, Théodore Robitaille, for the 1880 St. Jean-Baptiste Day ceremony and was officially adopted in 1980. Calixa Lavallée wrote the music, which was a setting of a patriotic poem composed by the poet and judge Sir Adolphe-Basile Routhier. The text was originally only in French before it was adapted into English in 1906.

== History ==
=== Indigenous music ===
For thousands of years, Canada has been inhabited by indigenous peoples from a variety of different cultures and of several major linguistic groupings. Each of the Indigenous communities had (and have) their own unique musical traditions. Chanting is widely popular, with many of its performers also using a variety of musical instruments. They used the materials at hand to make their instruments for thousands of years before Europeans immigrated to the New World. They made gourds and animal horns into rattles which were elaborately carved and painted. In woodland areas, they made horns of birchbark along with drumsticks of carved antlers and wood. Drums were generally made of carved wood and animal hides. These musical instruments provide the background for songs and dances.

For many years after European settlement, First Nations and Inuit peoples were discouraged from practicing their traditional ceremonies. However, impacts varied significantly depending on such aspects as the time period, relative population size, relation quality, resistance, etc. In 1606–1607 Marc Lescarbot collected the earliest extant transcriptions of songs from the Americas: three songs of Henri Membertou, the sakmow (Grand Chief) of the Mi'kmaq First Nations tribe situated near Port Royal, present-day Nova Scotia.

=== 17th century ===
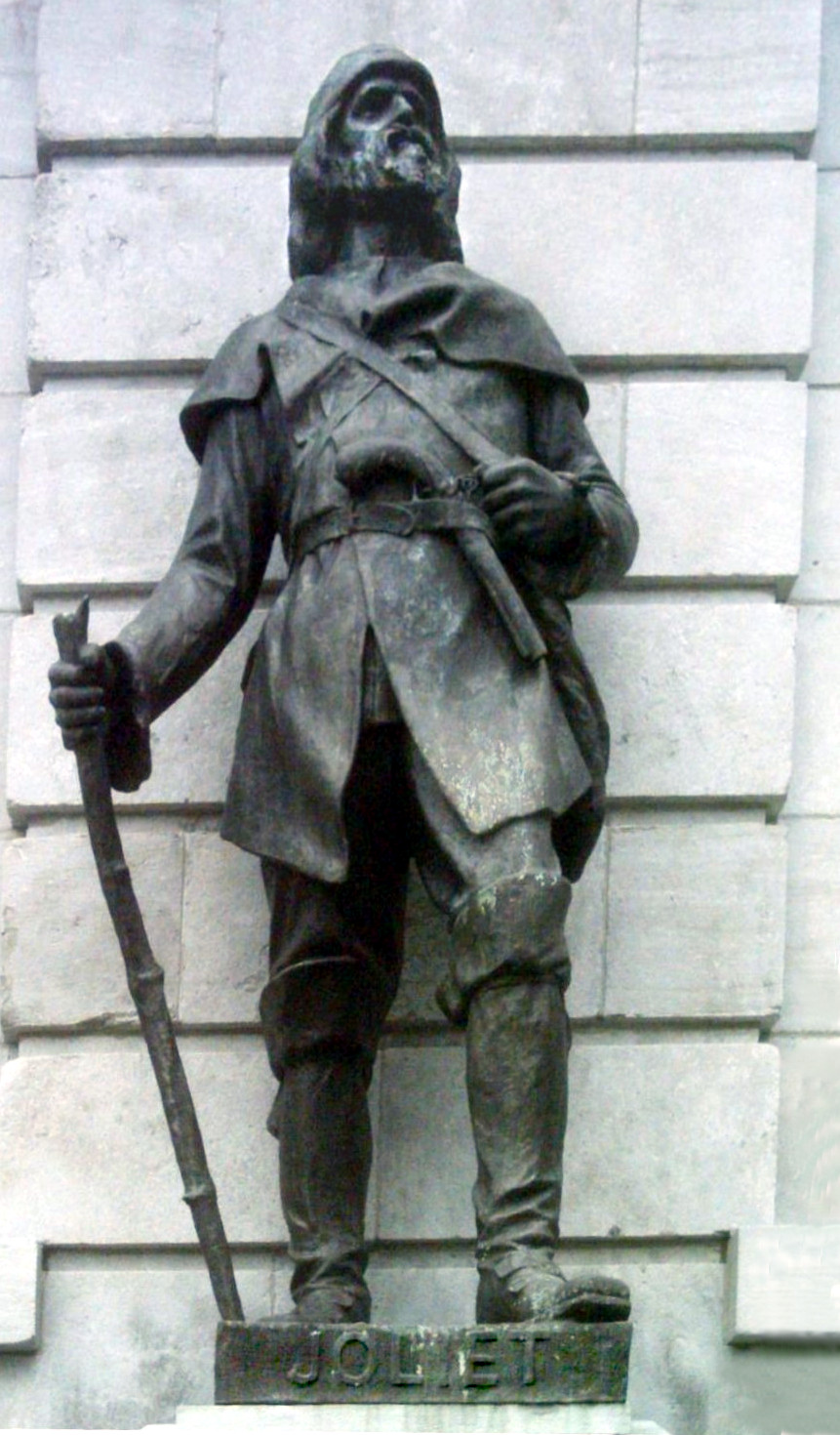
Louis Jolliet – sculpture at the Quebec Parliament

French settlers and explorers to New France brought with them a great love of song, dance and fiddle playing. Beginning in the 1630s French and Indigenous children at Québec were taught to sing and play European instruments, like viols, violins, guitars, transverse flutes, drums, fifes and trumpets. Ecole des Ursulines and The Ursuline Convent are among North America's oldest schools and the first institutions of learning for women in North America. Both were founded in 1639 by French nun Marie of the Incarnation (1599–1672) alongside the laywoman Marie-Madeline de Chauvigny de la Peltrie (1603–1671) and are the first Canadian institutions to have music as part of the curriculum.

The earliest written record of violins in Canada comes from the Jesuit Relation of 1645. The Jesuits additionally have the first documented organ sale, imported for their Québec chapel in 1657. Notre-Dame de Québec Cathedral, built in 1647, is the primatial church of Canada and seat of the Roman Catholic Archdiocese of Quebec. It is the oldest Catholic "Episcopal see" in the New World north of Mexico and site of the first documented choir in Canada.

In what was then known as New France, the first formal ball was given by Louis-Théandre Chartier de Lotbinière (1612–1688) on 4 February 1667. Louis Jolliet (1645–1700) is on record as one of the first classically trained practicing musicians in New France, although history has recognized him more as an explorer, hydrographer and voyageur. Jolliet is said to have played the organ, harpsichord, flute, and trumpet. In 1700, under British rule at this time, an organ was installed in Notre-Dame Basilica in Montreal and military bands gave concerts on the Champ de Mars. A French-born priest, René Ménard, composed motets around 1640, and a second Canadian-born priest, Charles-Amador Martin, is credited with the plainchant music for the Sacrae familiae felix spectaculum, in celebration of the Holy Family feast day in 1700.

=== 18th century ===
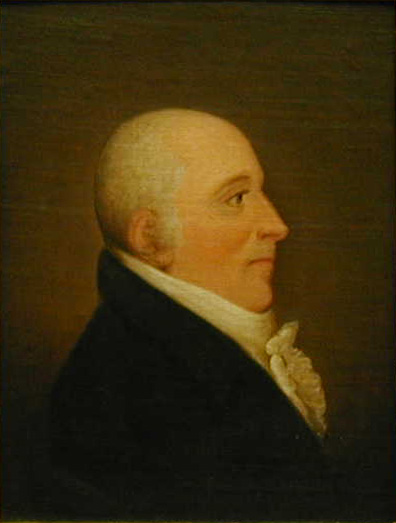
Joseph Quesnel (1746–1809)

Historically, music was composed in Canada's colonies and settlements during the 18th century, although very few popular named works have survived or were even published. The French and Indian Wars began and left the population economically drained and ill-equipped to develop cultural pursuits properly. The part-time composers of this period were nonetheless often quite skilled. Traditional songs and dances, such as those of the Habitants and Métis, were transmitted orally, from generation to generation and from village to village, thus people felt no need to transcribe or publish them. Printed music was required, for music teachers and their pupils, who were from the privileged minority where domestic music making was considered a proof of gentility. Music publishing and printing in Europe by this time was a thriving industry, but it did not begin in Canada until the 19th century. Canadian composers were not able to focus entirely on creating new music in these years, as most made their living in other musical activities such as leading choirs, church organists and teaching. Regimental bands were musically a part of civil life and typically featured a dozen woodwind and brass instruments, performing at parades, festive ceremonies, minuets, country dances and balls.

After the 1760s, regular concerts became a part of the cultural landscape, as well as a wide variety of dancing. Operatic excerpts began to appear, and before the end of the century Canada had its first home-grown opera. A "Concert Hall" existed in Québec by 1764 and subscription concerts by 1770, given, one may presume, by band players and skilled amateurs. Programs for the Québec and Halifax concerts of the 1790s reveal orchestral and chamber music by Handel, J.C. Bach, Haydn, Mozart and Pleyel. Canada's first two operas were written, ca. 1790 and ca. 1808 by composer, poet, and playwright Joseph Quesnel (1746–1809). The instrument of favour for the lower class was the fiddle. Fiddlers were a fixture in most public drinking establishments. God Save the King/Queen has been sung in Canada since British rule and by the mid-20th century was, along with "O Canada", one of the country's two de facto national anthems.

=== 19th century ===
The beginning of the 19th century Canadian musical ensembles had started forming in great numbers, writing waltzes, quadrilles, polkas and galops. The first volumes of music printed in Canada was the "Graduel romain" in 1800 followed by the "Union Harmony" in 1801. Folk music was still thriving, as recounted in the poem titled "A Canadian Boat Song". The poem was composed by the Irish poet Thomas Moore (1779–1852) during a visit to Canada in 1804. "The Canadian Boat Song" was so popular that it was published several times over the next forty years in Boston, New York City and Philadelphia. Dancing likewise was an extremely popular form of entertainment as noted In 1807 by the Scottish traveler and artist George Heriot (1759–1839), who wrote:

The whole of the Canadian inhabitants are remarkably fond of dancing, and frequently amuse themselves at all seasons with that agreeable exercise.

— George Heriot, Travels Through the Canadas (1807)

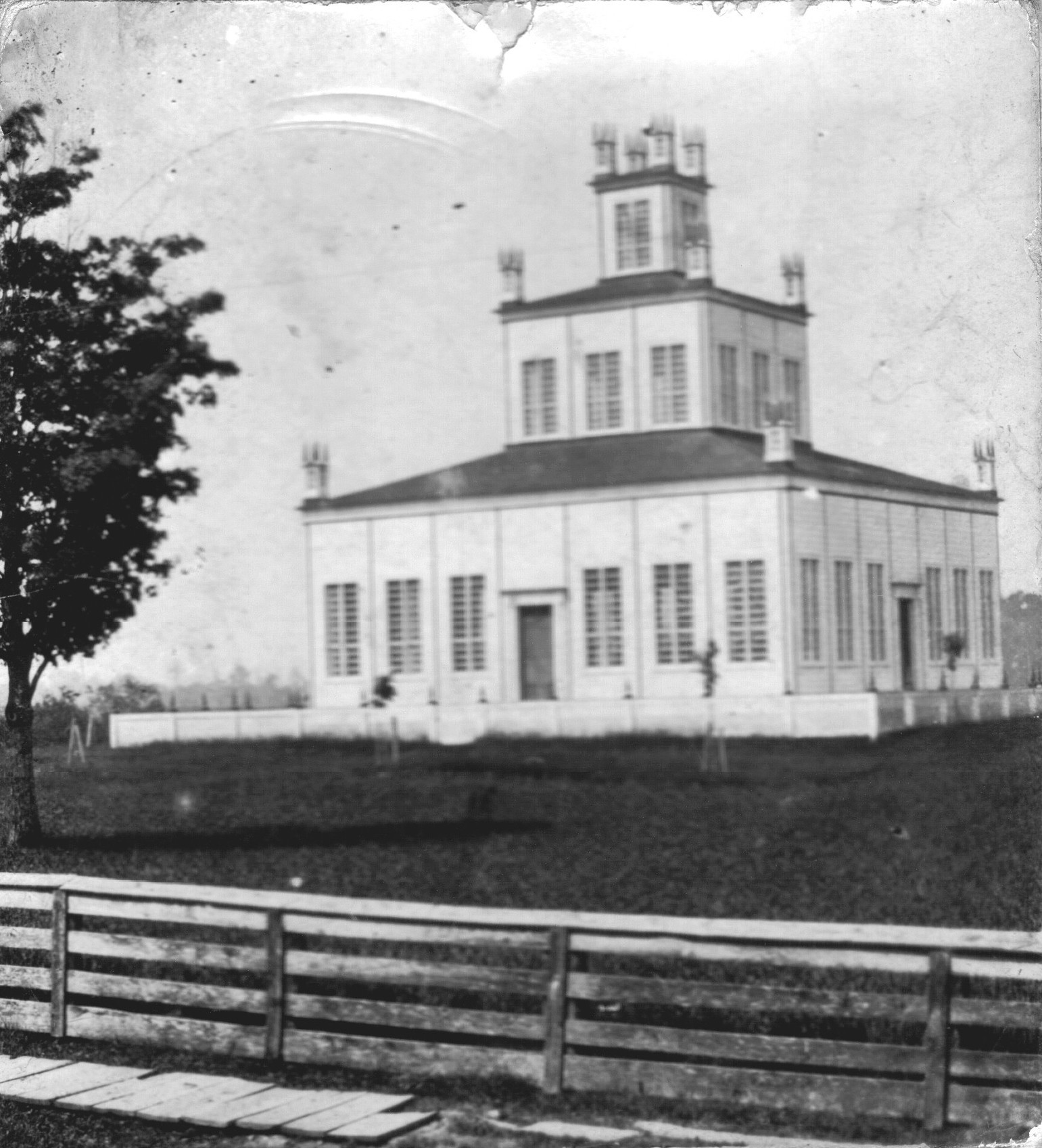
The Temple of the Children of Peace, where the band played from the second floor

Among the earliest musical societies were Halifax's "New Union Singing Society" of 1809 and Québec's "Harmonic Society" of 1820. One of the first registered all-civilian musical ensembles was a religious sect organized from Upper Canada called the Children of Peace in 1820. In 1833, a student orchestra was organized at the Séminaire de Québec the Société Ste-Cécile, as it was known, and was one of the earliest ensembles of its kind in Lower Canada. The first appearance of a piece of music in a newspaper or magazine was in the pages of the Montreal twice-weekly newspaper, La Minerve, on September 19, 1831. Many immigrants during this time lived in relative isolation and music sometimes obtained through subscriptions to newspapers and magazines, provided entertainment and a life line to civilization. One of the earliest surviving publications in Canada of a song on the piano in sheet music format is "The Merry Bells of England" by J. F. Lehmann, of Bytown (later Ottawa) in 1840. It was published by John Lovell in the literary magazine Literary Garland.

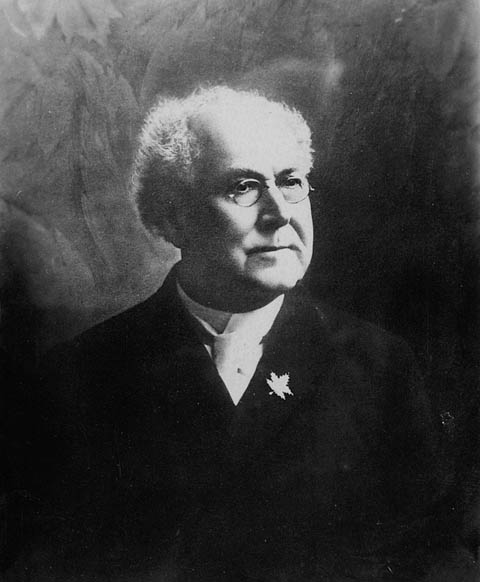
Alexander Muir (1830–1906)

The Great Migration of Canada from 1815 to 1850, consisting largely of Irish, and British immigrants, broadened considerably the Canadian musical culture. 1844, Samuel Nordheimer (1824–1912) opened a music store in Toronto selling pianos and soon thereafter began to publish engraved sheet music. Samuel Nordheimers store was among the first and the largest specialized music publisher in the Province of Canada. They initially had the sole right to publish copies of Alexander Muir's "The Maple Leaf Forever" that for many years served as an unofficial Canadian national anthem.

By the time of Canadian Confederation (1867), songwriting had become a favored means of personal expression across the land. In a society in which most middle-class families now owned a harmonium or piano, and standard education included at least the rudiments of music, the result was often an original song. Such stirrings frequently occurred in response to noteworthy events, and few local or national excitements were allowed to pass without some musical comment.

The 1870s saw several conservatories open their doors, providing their string, woodwind and brass faculty, leading to the opportunity for any class level of society to learn music. One Sweetly Solemn Thought in 1876 by Hamilton-based Robert S. Ambrose, became one of the most popular songs to ever be published in the 19th century. It fulfilled the purpose of being an appropriate song to sing in the parlors of homes that would not permit any non-sacred music to be performed on Sundays. At the same time it could be sung in dance halls or on the stage along with selections from operas and operettas.

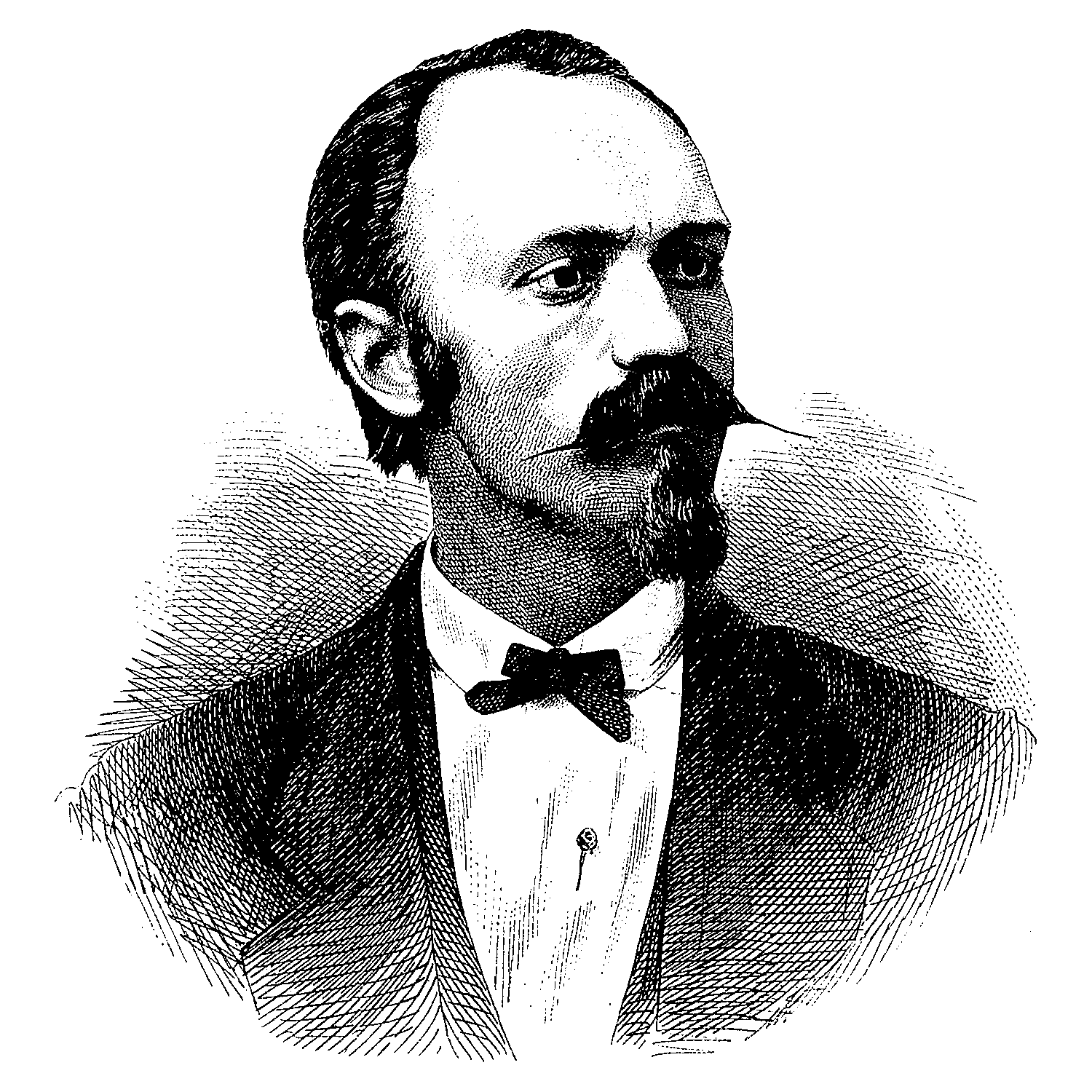
Calixa Lavallée (1842–1891)

"O Canada" was originally commissioned by the Lieutenant Governor of Quebec, the Honourable Théodore Robitaille (1834–1897), for the 1880 St. Jean-Baptiste Day ceremony. Calixa Lavallée (1842–1891) wrote the music, which was a setting of a patriotic poem composed by the poet and judge Sir Adolphe-Basile Routhier (1839–1920). The text was originally only in French, before it was translated into English from 1906 on.

Leo, the Royal Cadet a light opera with music by Oscar Ferdinand Telgmann and a libretto by George Frederick Cameron was composed in Kingston, Ontario, in 1889. The work centres on Nellie's love for Leo, a cadet at the Royal Military College of Canada who becomes a hero serving during the Anglo-Zulu War in 1879. The operetta focussed on typical character types, events and concerns of Telgmann and Cameron's time and place.

=== 20th century ===
==== 1900–1929 ====
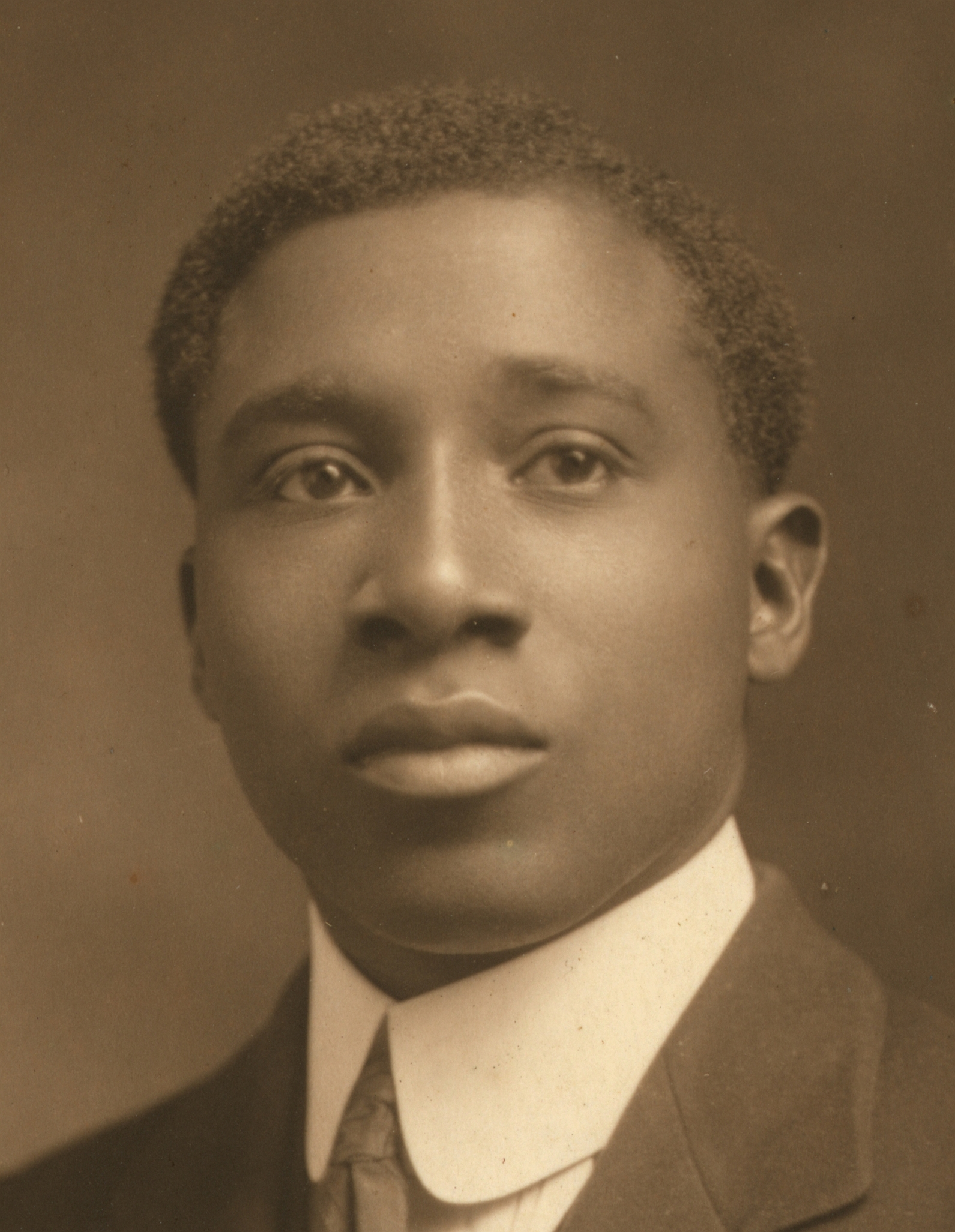
R. Nathaniel Dett (1882–1943)

Prior to the development of the gramophone, Canadian songwriters' works were published as sheet music, or in periodicals in local newspapers such as The Montreal Gazette and Toronto Empire. Most recordings purchased by Canadians in the early days of the gramophone were made by American and British performers, behind some of these international hits were Canadian songwriters. Robert Nathaniel Dett (1882–1943) was among the first Black Canadian composers during the early years of the American Society of Composers, Authors and Publishers. His works often appeared among the programs of William Marion Cook's New York syncopated Orchestra. Dett himself performed at Carnegie Hall and at the Boston Symphony Hall as a pianist and choir director. Following quickly on the gramophone's spread came Canada's involvement in the First World War. The war was the catalyst for the writing and recording of large numbers of Canadian-written popular songs, some of which achieved lasting international commercial success. The military during World War I produced official music such as regimental marches and songs as well as utilitarian bugle calls. The soldiers had a repertoire of their own, largely consisting of new, often ribald, lyrics to older tunes.

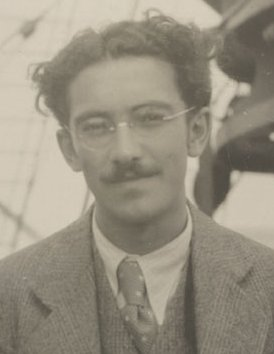
Murray Adaskin (1906–2002)

Canada's first independent record label Compo Company built a pressing plant (the largest of its day) in 1918 at Lachine, Quebec. Compo was originally created to serve the several American independent record companies such as Okeh Records which wanted to distribute records in Canada. The 1920s saw Canada's first radio stations, this allowed Canadian songwriters to contribute some of the most famous popular music of the early 20th century. Canada's first commercial radio station CFCF (formerly XWA) begins broadcasting regularly scheduled programming in Montreal in 1920, followed by CKAC, Canada's first French language radio station, in 1922. By 1923, there were 34 radio stations in Canada and subsequently proliferated at a remarkable rate, and with them spread the popularity of jazz. Jazz became associated with all things modern, sophisticated, and also decadent.

In 1925, the Canadian Performing Rights Society was formed to administer public performance and royalties for composers and lyricists. It became known as the Composers, Authors and Publishers Association of Canada (CAPAC). Toronto-born Murray Adaskin (1906–2002) was a violinist, composer, conductor and teacher at the University of Saskatchewan. From 1923 to 1936 he was an orchestral and chamber musician with the Toronto Symphony Orchestra, he was later named head of music at the University of Saskatchewan. He was a composer-in-residence at the University of Saskatchewan, the first appointment of this type in Canada.

The RCA Victor factory located in Montreal, Quebec housed Canada's first recording studio featuring polycylindrical walls which allowed the sounds to reflect in all directions. Studio Victor had artists from across Canada come in and record in both English and French, as well as had many different genres be recorded within their walls such as jazz, chamber music, choirs, classical music, folk and country. The factory is now home to many businesses one being the Musée des ondes Emile Berliner, a museum focused on the work of Berliner, mostly gramophones, flat disks, and later radios when his company merged with RCA, as well as the nature and science of sound waves.

==== 1930–1959 ====
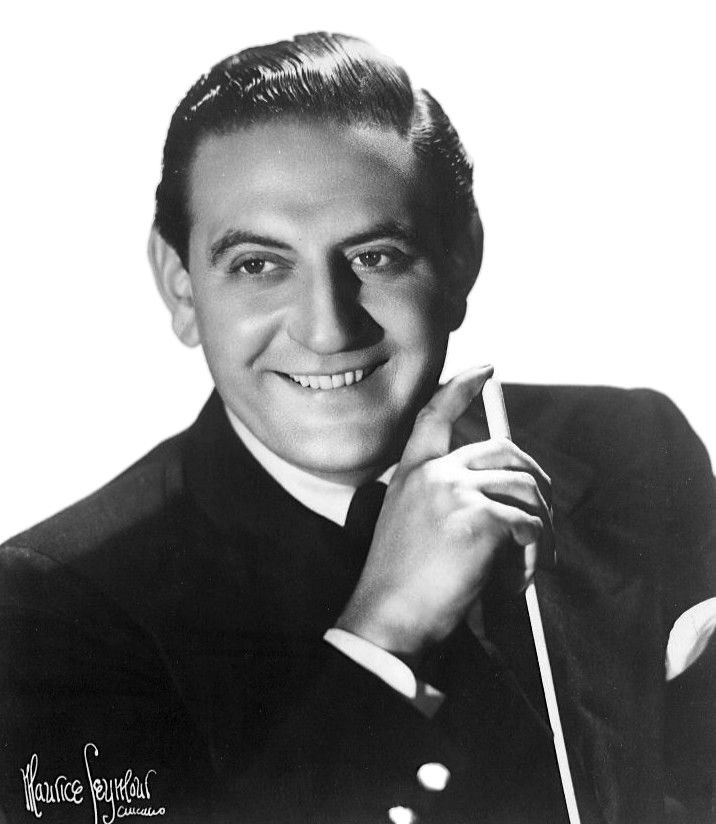
Guy Lombardo (1902–1977)

During the Great Depression in Canada, the majority of people listened to what today would be called swing (Jazz) just as country was starting its roots. The diversity in the evolution of swing dancing in Canada is reflected in its many American names, Jive, Jitterbug and Lindy. Canada's first big band star was Guy Lombardo (1902–1977), who formed his easy listening band, The Royal Canadians, with his brothers and friends. They achieved international success starting in the mid-1920s selling an estimated 250 million phonograph records, and were the first Canadians to have a #1 single on Billboard's top 100. In 1932, the first Broadcasting Act was passed by Parliament creating the Canadian Radio Broadcasting Commission. It was to both regulate all broadcasting and create a new national public radio network. 1936, the Canadian Broadcasting Corporation came into existence, at the time, a million Canadian households had a radio.

Emerging from the Great Depression on near equal-footing to American popular music, Canadian popular music continued to enjoy considerable success at home and abroad in the following years. Among them Montreal's jazz virtuoso Oscar Peterson (1925–2007), considered to have been one of the greatest pianists of all time, releasing over 200 recordings and receiving several Grammy Awards during his lifetime. Also notable are country music stars Wilf Carter (1904-1996) and Hank Snow (1914–1999). Carter, from Nova Scotia, started out singing in the 1920s hosting a radio show in Alberta by 1930 before moving to America where he hosted another radio show scoring several hits. Snow, also from Nova Scotia, signed with RCA Victor in 1936 and went on to become one of America's biggest and most innovative country music superstars of the 1940s and 1950s. Snow became a regular performer at the Grand Ole Opry on WSM in Nashville and released more than 45 LPs over his lifetime. Snow was one of the inaugural inductees to the Canadian Songwriters Hall of Fame started in 2003.

Canada during the Second World War produced some patriotic songs, but they were not hits in the music industry sense. A number of Canadian singers who learned their craft in Canadian opera companies in the 1930s went on to sing in major international opera houses. Most notable from the 1940s is contralto singer Portia White (1911–1968). She achieved international fame because of her voice and stage presence. As a Canadian female of African descent, her popularity helped to open previously closed doors for talented women who followed. She has been declared "A person of national historic significance" by the Government of Canada. In 1964 she performed for Queen Elizabeth II, at the opening of the Confederation Centre of the Arts.

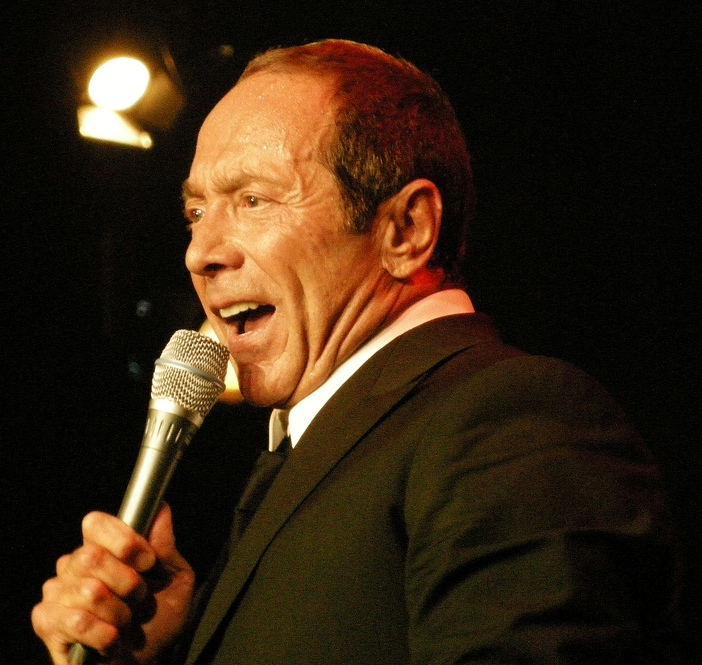
Paul Anka, 2007

Following World War II a growth phase for Canadian bands was experienced, this time among school bands. Rapid advances in the inclusion of instrumental music study in formal school curricula brought about fundamental changes to the philosophy of the band movement and the type of repertoire available. The CHUM Chart debuted on May 27, 1957, under the name CHUM's Weekly Hit Parade, was in response to the fast-growing diversity of music that needed to be subdivided and categorized. The CHUM charts were the longest-running Top 40 chart in Canada ending in 1986.

The 1950s would see Pop vocal and Doo Wop groups the Four Lads, Crew-Cuts and Diamonds score several hits internationally becoming the first Canadian groups to do so in the Rock and Roll era. The Crew-Cuts would become famous with their covers of Doo Wop hits like "Sh-Boom" and "Earth Angel" while the Diamonds would do the same with "Little Darlin", "Why Do Fools Fall In Love", "Silhouettes" and '"The Stroll". These records would be hits in America, Europe and Australia. 1958 saw its first Canadian rock and roll teen idol Paul Anka, who went to New York City where he auditioned for ABC with the song "Diana". This song brought Anka instant stardom as it reached number one on the US Billboard charts. "Diana" has gone on to be one of the best selling 45s in music history. US-born rockabilly pioneer Ronnie Hawkins moved to Canada in 1958, where he became a key player in the Canadian blues and rock scene. The 4th of October was declared "Ronnie Hawkins Day" by the city of Toronto when Hawkins was inducted into Canada's Walk of Fame. He was also inducted into the Canadian Music Industry Hall of Fame and his pioneering contribution to rockabilly has been recognized with induction into the Rockabilly Hall of Fame. The first Canadian Rock band (as opposed to a vocal group like the Crew-Cuts and Diamonds) to score an international hit were the Beau-Marks with "Clap Your Hands" in 1960 which would make the charts in Canada, Australia and America and would get them invited the Ed Sullivan Show being the first Canadian band to do so.

==== 1960–1999 ====
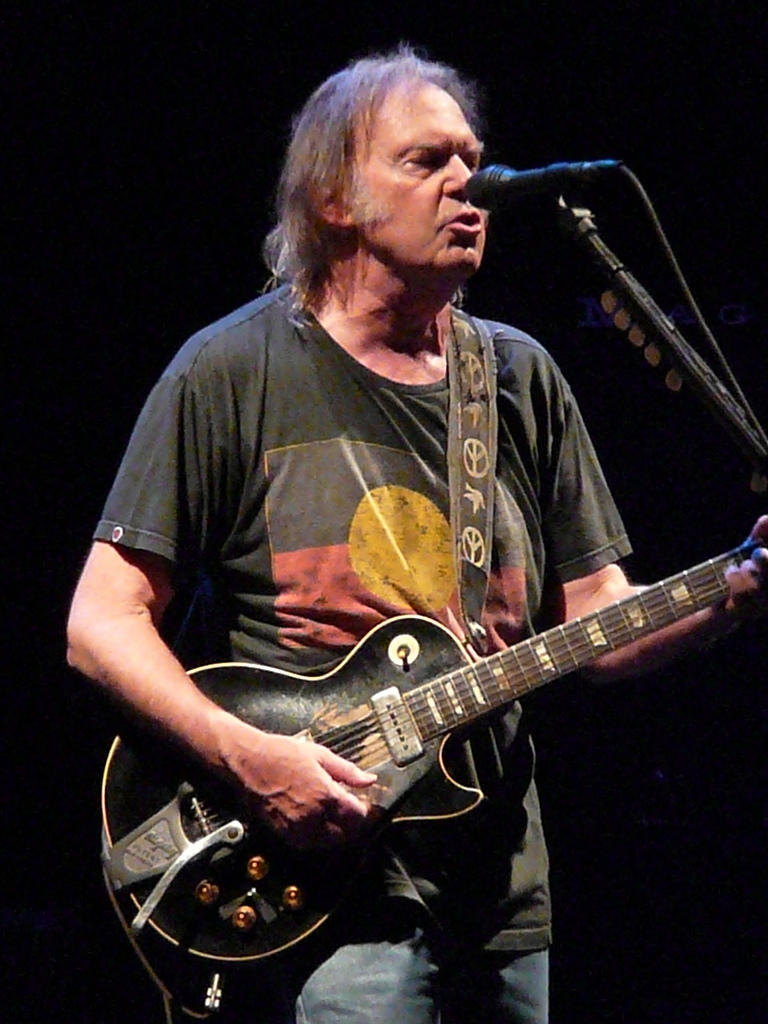
Neil Young, 2009

Canadian artists and Canadian ensembles were generally forced to turn toward the United States to establish healthy long lasting careers during the 1960s. Canada would produce some of the world's most influential singer-songwriters during this time. Gordon Lightfoot made his first chart appearance in June 1962. Among the most notable is Neil Young who has been inducted into the Canadian Music Hall of Fame, Canada's Walk of Fame and the Rock and Roll Hall of Fame twice. Leonard Cohen has been inducted into both the Canadian Music Hall of Fame and the Canadian Songwriters Hall of Fame and is also a Companion of the Order of Canada. Folk legend Joni Mitchell is an Alberta native, and has been inducted into both the Canadian Music Hall of Fame and the Rock and Roll Hall of Fame. Other important Canadian Rock artists who would have significant international success in the 60's were the Guess Who, Steppenwolf and The Band along with members of Buffalo Springfield, the Lovin' Spoonful and the Mamas & the Papas. In Jazz pianist and arranger Gil Evans would be notable for his collaborations with Miles Davis on a series of classic albums and trumpeter Maynard Ferguson for his work with Stan Kenton.

Walt Grealis of Toronto started in the music business with Apex Records in 1960, the Ontario distributor for Compo Company. He later joined London Records, where he worked until February 1964, when he then established RPM weekly trade magazine. From the first issue of RPM Weekly on February 24, 1964, to its final issue on November 13, 2000, RPM was the defining charts in Canada. The American and British counterculture explosion and hippie movement had diverted music to that which was dominated by socially and American politically incisive lyrics by the late 1960s. The music was an attempt to reflect upon the events of the time – civil rights, the war in Vietnam and the rise of feminism. This led to the Canadian government passing Canadian content legislation to help Canadian artists. On January 18, 1971, regulations came into force requiring AM radio stations to devote 30 percent of their musical selections to Canadian content. Although this was (and still is) controversial, it quite clearly contributed to the development of a nascent Canadian pop star system.

With the introduction in the mid-1970s of mainstream music on FM radio stations, where it was common practice to program extended performances, musicians were no longer limited to songs of three minutes' duration as dictated by AM stations for decades. Other notable musicians who have been one of the largest Canadian exports include the progressive rock band Rush, Triumph and Bryan Adams. In the classical world, homegrown talent Canadian Brass was established in Toronto in 1970.

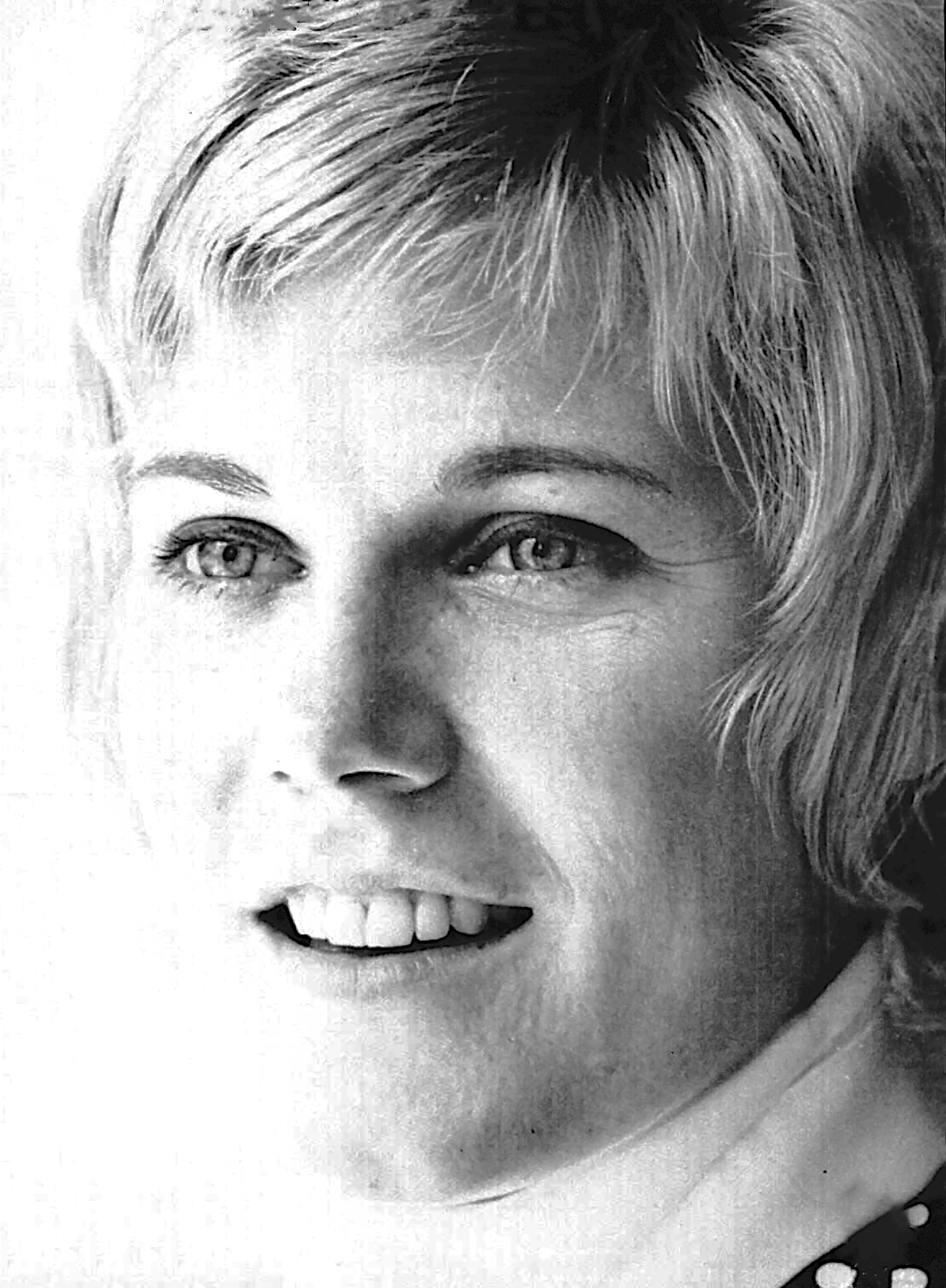
Anne Murray

Country music remained popular in Canada in the 1970s thanks to the CBC's The Tommy Hunter show and the adult contemporary radio format which benefited the international stardom of Anne Murray. However, the more mainstream sound would hinder Stompin' Tom Connors until he would have a revival in the 1990s.

Canada's first nationwide music awards began as a reader poll conducted by Canadian music industry trade magazine RPM Weekly in December 1964. A similar balloting process continued until 1970 when the RPM Gold Leaf Awards, as they were then known, were changed to the Juno Awards. The Canadian Academy of Recording Arts and Sciences held the first Juno Award ceremony in 1975. This was in response to rectifying the same concerns about promotion of Canadian artists that the Canadian Radio-television and Telecommunications Commission had.

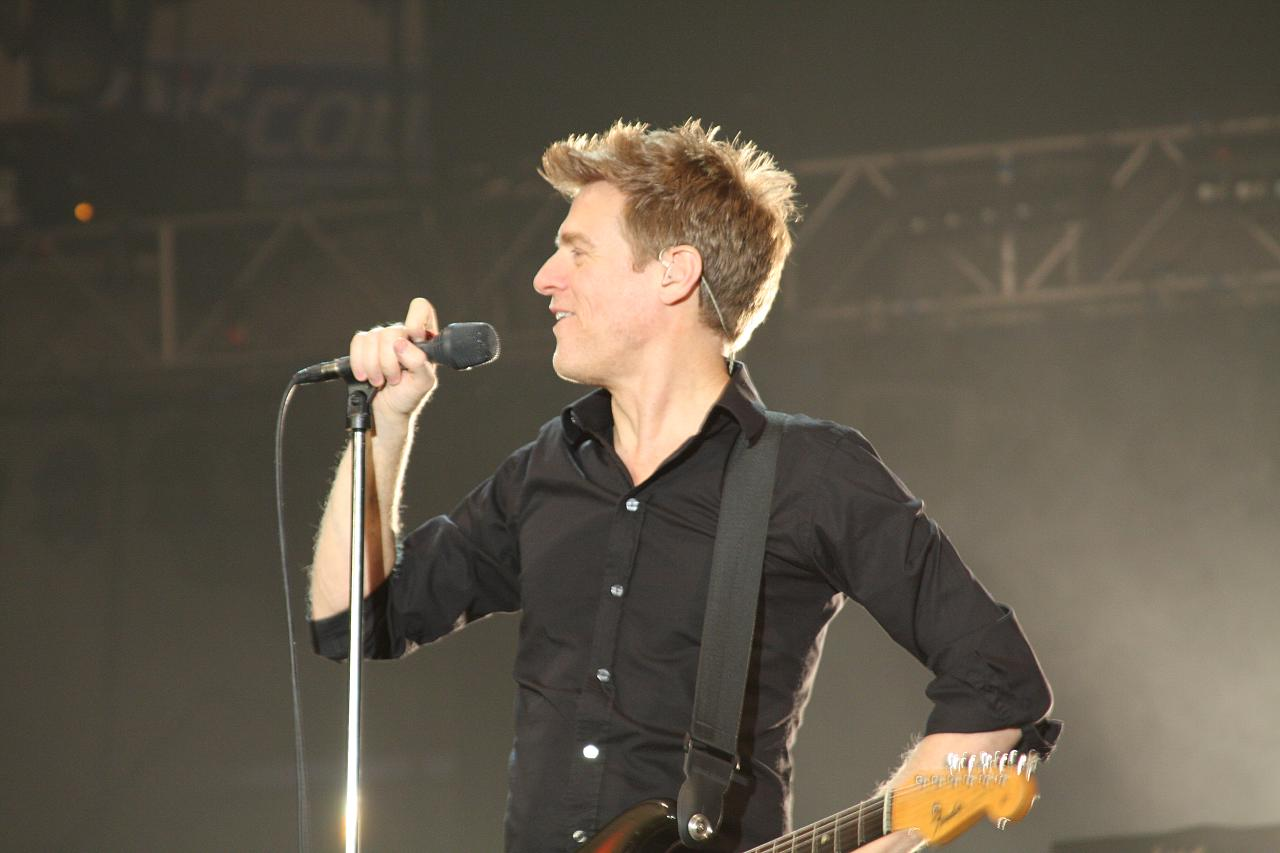
Bryan Adams, 2009

Canadian music changed course in the 1980s and 1990s, the changing fast-paced culture was accompanied by an explosion in youth culture. Until the mid-1960s, little attention was paid to music by Canadian daily newspapers except as news or novelty. With the introduction during the late 1970s of the "music critic", coverage began to rival that of any other topic. Canadian publications devoted to all styles of music either exclusively or in tandem with more general editorial content directed to young readers, was expanding exponentially.

The influence and innovations of Canadian hip hop came to the foreground in Canada, with musicians Like Maestro Fresh Wes, Snow, and the Dream Warriors, when music videos became an important marketing tool for Canadian musicians, with the debut of MuchMusic in 1984 and MusiquePlus in 1986. Now both English and French Canadian musicians had outlets to promote all forms of music through video in Canada. The networks were not just an opportunity for artists to get their videos played—the networks created VideoFACT, a fund to help emerging artists produce their videos.

Canadian women at the end of the 20th century enjoyed greater international commercial success than ever before. Canadian women set many records, in terms financial, critical and in their immediate and strong influence on their respective genres. They were the women and daughters who had fought for emancipation and equality a generation before. Like Shania Twain, Alanis Morissette and most notable is French-Canadian singer, Celine Dion, who became Canada's best-selling music artist, and who, in 2004, received the Chopard Diamond Award from the World Music Awards for surpassing 175 million in album sales, worldwide.

=== 21st century ===
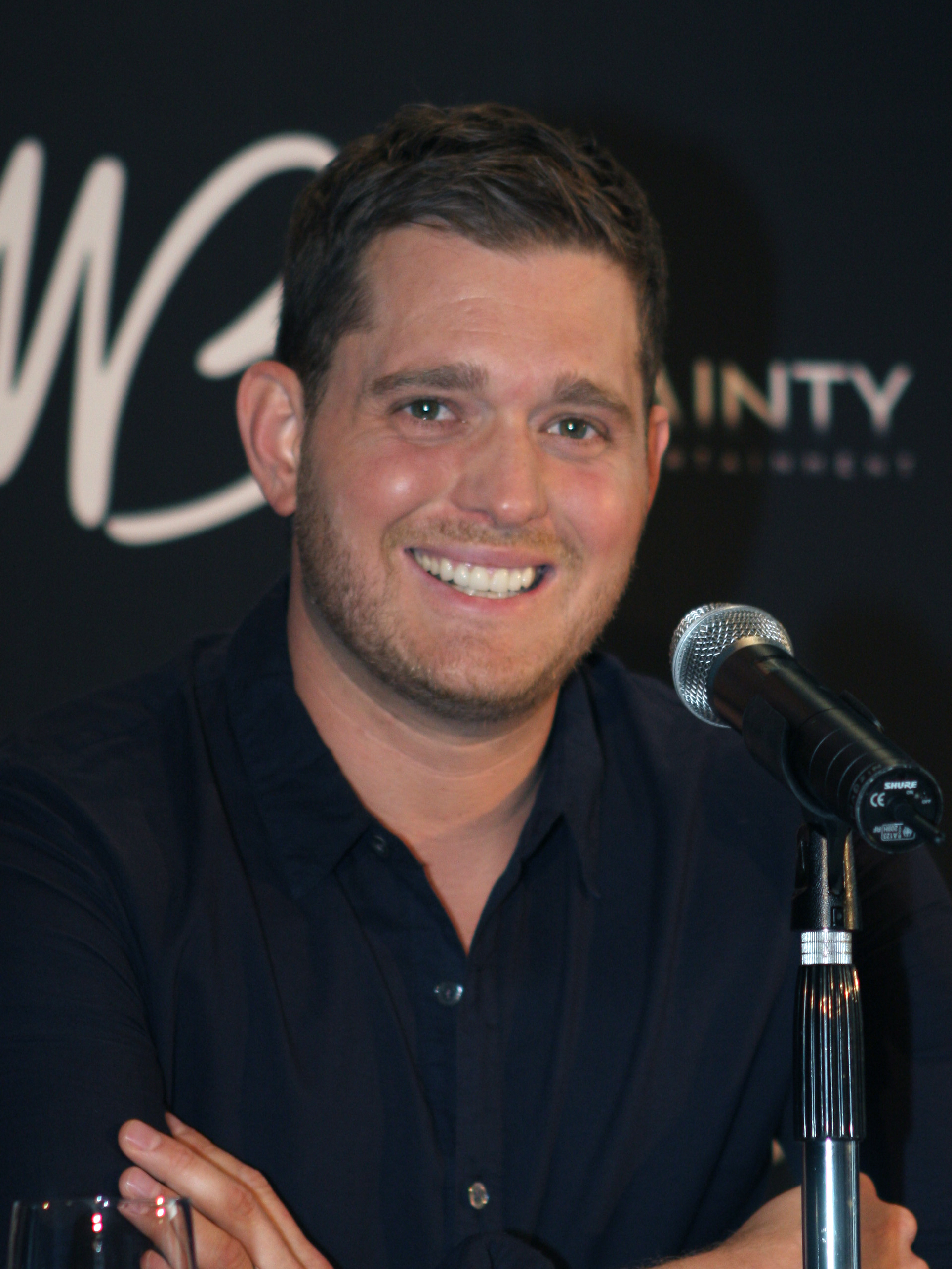
Michael Bublé in February 2011

The turn of the millennium was a time of incredible nationalism, at least as far as Canadian radio is concerned. The 1971 CRTC rules (30% Canadian content on Canadian radio) finally come into full effect and by the end of the 20th century radio stations would have to play 35% Canadian content. This led to an explosion in the 21st century of Canadian pop musicians dominating the airwaves unlike any era before. In 1996, VideoFACT launched PromoFACT, a funding program to help new artists produce electronic press kits and websites. At about the same time, the CD (cheap to manufacture) replaced the vinyl album and cassette tape (expensive to manufacture). Shortly thereafter, the Internet allowed musicians to directly distribute their music, thus bypassing the selection of the old-fashioned "record label". Canada's mainstream music industry has suffered as a result of the internet and the boom of independent music. The drop in annual sales between 1999, the year that Napster's unauthorized peer-to-peer file sharing service launched, and the end of 2004 was $465 million.

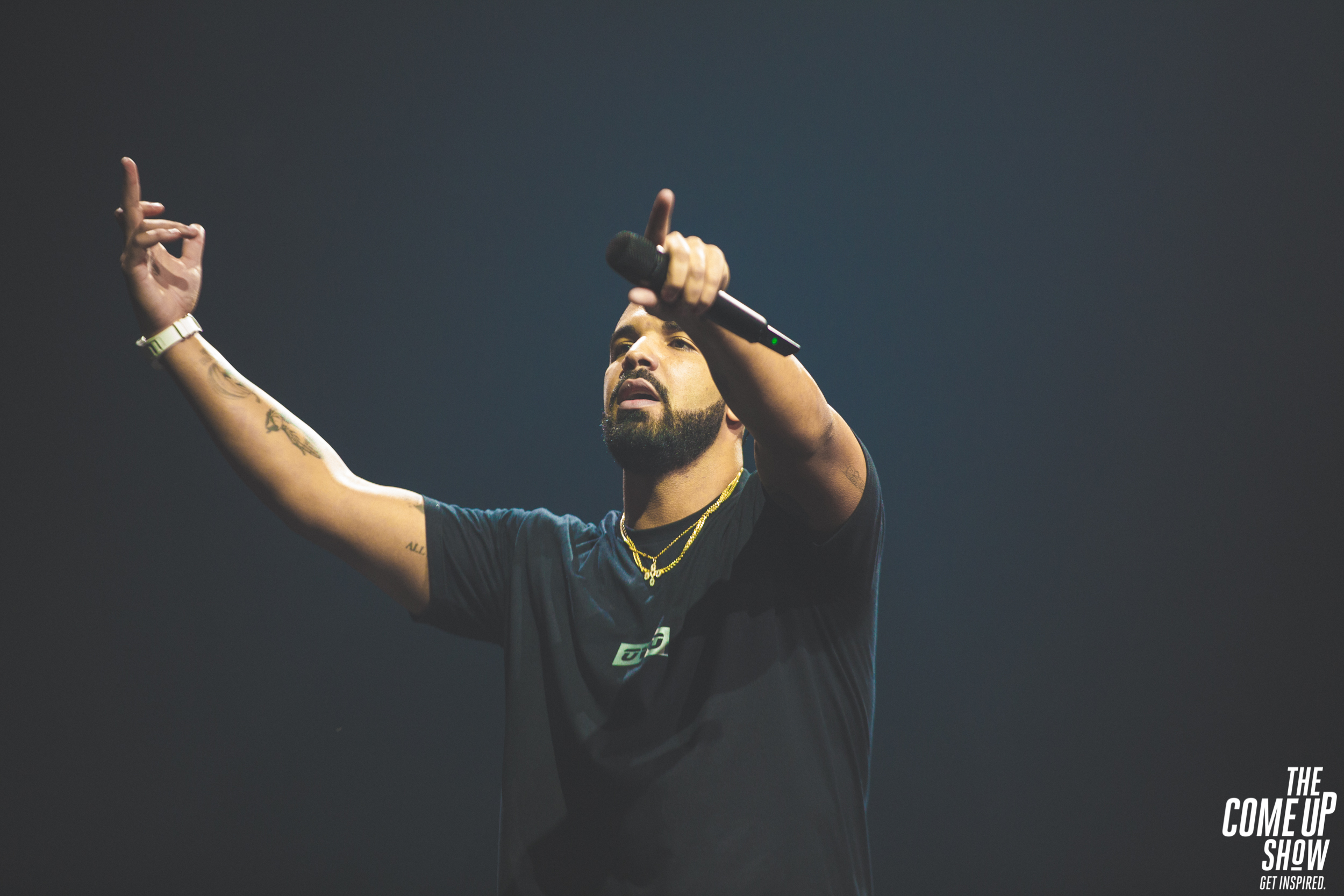
Drake performing at the Summer Sixteen Tour in Toronto in 2016

In 2007, Canada joined the controversial Anti-Counterfeiting Trade Agreement talks, whose outcome could potentially have a significant impact on the Canadian music industry. In 2010 Canada introduced new copyright legislation. The amended law makes hacking digital locks illegal, but enshrine into law the ability of purchasers to record and copy music from a CD to portable devices.

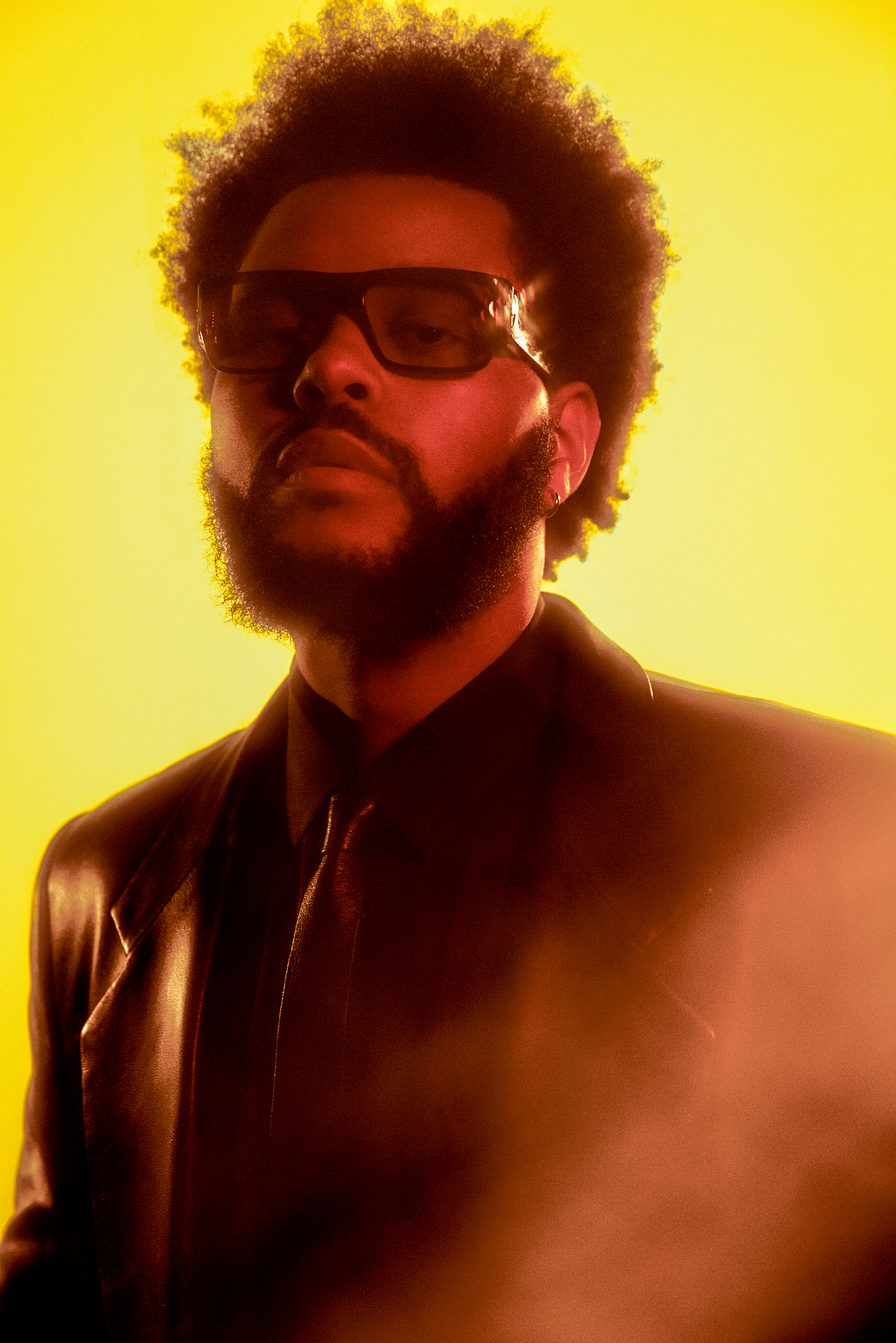
The Weeknd in 2021

The early 2000s saw Canadian independent artists continue to expand their audience into the United States and beyond. Mainstream Canadian artists with global recorded contracts such as Nelly Furtado, Avril Lavigne, Michael Bublé, Nickelback, Drake, The Weeknd, Shawn Mendes and Justin Bieber reached new heights in terms of international success, while dominating the American music charts. The late 2010s and early 2020 saw the deaths of Gord Downie of The Tragically Hip and Neil Peart of Rush.

Canada is set to become the first North American country to join the Eurovision Song Contest in 2027.

== Anthems ==
Sheet music for Canada's national anthem. O Canada

Patriotic music in Canada dates back over 200 years as a distinct category from British patriotism, preceding the first legal steps to independence by over 50 years. The earliest, "The Bold Canadian", was written in 1812.

- "O Canada" – the national anthem adopted in 1980.
- "God Save the King" – Royal Anthem of Canada since 1980.
- "The Maple Leaf Forever" – unofficial old national anthem 1867.
- "Alberta" official anthem of Alberta.
- "Ode to Newfoundland" – official anthem of Newfoundland and Labrador.
- "The Island Hymn" – official anthem of Prince Edward Island.
- "Gens du pays" – unofficial anthem of Quebec. Commonly associated with Quebec sovereignty.

== Accolades ==
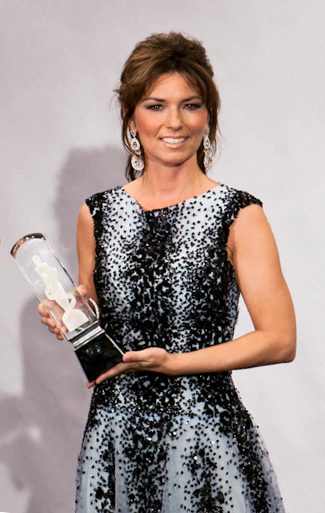
Shania Twain holding her 2011 Juno Award

The Canadian Music Hall of Fame established in 1976 honours Canadian musicians for their lifetime achievements. The ceremony is held each year as part of Canada's main annual music industry awards, the Juno Awards.

The Governor General's Performing Arts Awards for Lifetime Artistic Achievement are the foremost honours presented for excellence in the performing arts, in the categories of dance, classical music, popular music, film, and radio and television broadcasting. They were initiated in 1992 by then Governor General Ray Hnatyshyn, and winners receive $25,000 and a medal struck by the Royal Canadian Mint.

Canada also has many specific music awards, both for different genres and for geographic regions:

- CASBY Awards – Canada's annual independent and alternative music awards
- Canadian Country Music Awards – Canada's annual country music industry awards
- GMA Canada Covenant Awards – Canada's national awards for the Gospel music industry
- East Coast Music Awards – annual music appreciation for the East Coast of Canada
- Felix Awards – annual prize for members of the Quebec music industry
- Canadian Folk Music Awards – annual ceremony for achievements in folk and world music
- MuchMusic Video Awards – Canada's annual music video awards
- Polaris Music Prize – award annually given to the best full-length Canadian album based on artistic merit
- Prism Prize – annual award for achievements in music video
- Canadian Urban Music Awards – Canada's annual urban music awards
- Canadian Aboriginal Music Awards – Canada's annual appreciation for the promoters, creators and performers of Aboriginal music
- Western Canadian Music Awards – annual music appreciation for the western part of Canada

== Cultural and regional ==
Music of Canada (by province or territory)

Distinctive music scenes have been an integral part of the cultural landscape of Canada. With Canada being vast in size, the country throughout its history has had regional music scenes, with a wide and diverse accumulation of styles and genres from many different individual communities, such as Inuit music, music of the Maritimes and Canadian fiddle music.

== See also ==
- List of diamond-certified albums in Canada
- List of number-one singles in Canada
- List of radio stations in Canada
- List of Canadian composers
- List of Canadian musicians
- List of bands from Canada
- Canadian classical music
- Canadian opera
- National Youth Orchestra of Canada
- The Top 100 Canadian Albums (2007)
- Canada in the Eurovision Song Contest
