= Le Piano Rouge =

Music venue in Montreal, Quebec

(Le) Piano Rouge soul lounge was a live music venue in Montreal, Quebec, Canada during the late 2000s. In 2012, it was ranked by the Montreal Gazette as Montreal's top nightspot for live soul music. During its tenure, many renowned international and local artists were drawn to Le Piano Rouge including Wyclef Jean, Kris Bowers, Bruce Greenwood, Geraldine Hunt, DJ Robert Ouimet, Kaytranada, José James, Coco Thompson, Divine Brown, Lorraine Klaasen, Thandi Klaasen, Patsy Gallant, Sugar Sammy, Kim Richardson, Imposs, Malika Tirolien, Gemini award recipients Warren "Slim" Williams and Christine Ghawi, pianist Nicolas Hébert, Carlos Morgan, King Melrose, and Melina Soochan.

== Afrophilya ==
In February 2011, the international music festival Afrophilya was launched at Le Piano Rouge. Afrophilya is a contemporary view of Afro Culture and celebrates the artistic contributions of people of African descent to world culture.

== Historical context ==
Le Piano Rouge was founded by Allison Roberts aka Coco Brown an Afro-Caribbean-Canadian entrepreneur.

The club was located in Old Montreal, the venue of two former Montreal live music clubs: Black Bottom and Nuit Magique.
