= Music of Canadian cultures =

Music of Canadian Cultures is a wide and diverse accumulation of music from many different individual communities all across Canada. With Canada being vast in size, the country throughout its history has had regional music scenes. The music of Canada has reflected the multi-cultural influences that have shaped the country. First Nations people, the French, the British, the United States and many others nationalities have all made unique contributions to the musical heritage of Canada

== Music of specific Canadian cultures ==
=== First Nations ===
The First Nations people of Canada are of a number of diverse ethnic groups, each of which has their own musical traditions. There are some general similarities, however. Music is usually social (public) or ceremonial (private). Public, social music may be dance music accompanied by rattles and drums. Private, ceremonial music includes vocal songs with accompaniment on percussion, used to mark occasions like Midewivin ceremonies and Sun Dances.

Traditionally, First Nations, being resourceful and creative, used the materials at hand to make their instruments for centuries before Europeans immigrated to Canada. First Nations people made gourds and animal horns into rattles, many rattles were elaborately carved and beautifully painted. In woodland areas, they made horns of birchbark and drumsticks of carved antlers and wood. Drums were generally made of carved wood and animal hides. Drums and rattles are percussion instruments traditionally used by First Nations people. These musical instruments provide the background for songs, and songs are the background for dances. Many traditional First Nations people consider song and dance to be sacred. For many years after Europeans came to Canada, First Nations people were forbidden to practice their ceremonies.

=== Inuit music ===
Approximately 25,000 Inuit live in Northern Canada, primarily spread across Nunavut, the Northwest Territories, and Nunavik (northern Quebec). Prior to European contact, Inuit music was based around drums but has since grown to include fiddles and accordions. Music was dance-oriented and requested luck in hunting, gambling, or weather, and only rarely, if ever, expressing traditional purposes like love or specialized forms like work songs and lullabies. In the 20th century, Inuit music was influenced by Scottish and Irish sailors, as well as, most influentially, American country music. The Canadian Broadcasting Corporation has long been recording Inuit music, beginning with a station in Iqaluit in 1961. Accordion players like Charlie Panigoniak and Simeonie Keenainak quickly found an audience, with the latter notably incorporating musical influences like polkas and jigs from Quebec and Newfoundland.

Katajjaq, or "Inuit throat singing", has become well known as a curiosity. In this traditional singing style, female singers produce melodies from deep in their throats. A pair of singers stare at each other in a sort of contest. Common in Northern Quebec and Baffin Island, katajjaq singers perform in sync with each other, so that one is producing a strong accent while the other is producing a weak one. The contest ends when one singer begins laughing, runs out of breath or the pair's voices become simultaneous. To some extent, young Inuit have revitalized the genre, and musicians like Tudjaat have even incorporated pop structures.

=== Immigrant communities ===
Montreal's large immigrant communities include artists like Zekuhl (a band consisting of a Mexican, Chilean and a Quebecer raised in Cameroon), Karen Young, Eval Manigat (Haiti), and Lorraine Klaasen (South Africa), while Toronto has a large Balkan and Turkish community that has produced, most famously, the Flying Bulgar Klezmer Band and Staro Selo, alongside Punjabi by Nature, who incorporate bhangra, rock, dub, and English Punjabi pop, and the Afro-Nubians, who included musicians from across North America, Europe and Africa. Vancouver has very large Asian communities, including Chinese, Indian, and Iranian. Important artists include Orchid Ensemble, Uzume-Taiko and Silk Road Music. Moreover, the musicians from different ethnic backgrounds get together to create hybrid music: Proliferasian (Chinese, jazz, and free improvisation), Birds of Paradox (Taiwan, Ireland and India). Orchid Ensemble, Uzume-Taiko and Silk Road Music all work with different collaborators to produce different projects. The Vancouver Inter-Cultural Orchestra stages a large ensemble of 25 players, playing instruments from China, India, Iran, the Middle East, Japan, Korea, Vietnam, Africa, and the west. Bands in other cities include Finjan from Winnipeg.

=== French-Canadian music ===
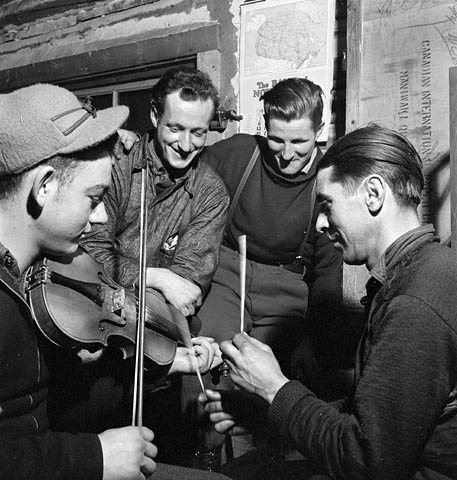
French-Canadian lumberjacks playing the fiddle with sticks for percussion, in a lumber camp in 1943.

French settlers brought music with them when inhabiting what is now Quebec and other areas throughout Canada. Since the arrival of French music in Canada, there has been much intermixing with the Celtic music of Anglo-Canada. French-Canadian folk music is generally performed to accompany dances like the jig, jeux dansé, ronde, cotillion, and quadrille. The fiddle is a very common instrument, played by virtuosos like Jean Carignan, Jos Bouchard, and Joseph Allard. Other instruments include the German diatonic accordion, played by the likes of Philippe Bruneau and Alfred Montmarquette, spoons, bones, and jaw harps.

=== Quebec music ===
French settlers to Quebec established their musical forms in the future province, but there was no scholarly study until Ernest Gagnon's 1865 collection of 100 folk songs. In 1967, Radio-Canada released The Centennial Collection of Canadian Folk Songs (much of which was focused on French-Canadian music), which helped launch a revival of Quebec folk. Singers like Yves Albert, Edith Butler, and, especially, Félix Leclerc and Gilles Vigneault, helped lead the way. The 1970s saw purists like La Rêve du Diable and La Bottine Souriante continued the trend. As Quebec folk continued to gain in popularity, artists like Leonard Cohen, Harmonium, Kate & Anna McGarrigle, Jim Corcoran, Bertrand Gosselin, and Paul Piché found a mainstream audience.

Since 1979, Quebec music artists have been recognized with the Felix Award.

=== Maritime music ===
The Music of Canada's Maritimes has included many artists from both the traditional and pop genres.

The traditional genre is heavily influenced by the music brought to the region by the European settlers, the most well known of which are the Scots & Irish Celtic and Acadian traditions. Folk songs are those passed on orally, usually composed by unknown persons. In the Maritime Provinces (New Brunswick, Nova Scotia, Prince Edward Island), sea shanties are widespread among the whaling and fishing workers. The most well known of these is Farewell to Nova Scotia. The lumber camps of New Brunswick have also produced their own body of folk songs. Irish and Scottish settlers in the eastern provinces of Canada brought traditions of fiddling and other forms of music. Having declined in popularity during the 20th century, a revival of Maritime traditional inspired music began in the late 1970s, led by artists such as John Allan Cameron and Stan Rogers and later, The Rankins, Mary Jane Lamond, Natalie MacMaster, Ashley MacIsaac, Barra MacNeils, and Barachois.

Successful pop acts from all genres have had degrees of national and international success since the beginning of recorded music period. Performers as diverse as Hank Snow, Anne Murray, Matt Minglewood and April Wine have all experienced tremendous success as popular music acts with considerable national and international tours and record sales. Since the 1990s, bands such as Sloan, Joel Plaskett, Matt Mays and Buck 65 have made a considerable impact.

=== Newfoundland music ===
Anglo-Canadian folk ballads are particularly well-preserved in Newfoundland. The widespread "Barbara Allen" is found in dozens of versions, as are songs like "The Farmer's Curst Wife", "Lord Randall", and "The Sweet Trinity". With the advent of printing, broadside ballads were found throughout Canada, many of them Anglo songs telling sad songs about unfulfilled love. In addition to the influence of English West Country folk music and sea shanties, Newfoundland music heavily incorporates themes from Irish music, with elements of the provinces French and Portuguese history also represented.

As with the Maritime provinces, contemporary artists were the catalyst for a revival of interest in traditional music. Great Big Sea, Figgy Duff and Irish Descendants carried the traditional sounds of Newfoundland across Canada and around the world, with the most popular being Great Big Sea.

=== Western Canada ===
Among the lumber camps of Ontario and British Columbia, and among the homesteaders and farmers of Alberta, Saskatchewan, and Manitoba, Anglo settlers adopted numerous American songs: for example "Bury Me Not on the Lone Prairie", along with the song known as "Prairie Land", "Saskatchewan" or "Alberta Land", which is adapted from an American song called "Beulah Land".

=== Caribbean music ===
The history of Caribbean music in Canada started in 1967, with Toronto's first annual Caribana festival. By 2000, Canada began to develop as a new pole in the Caribbean music industry. This is especially true of the genres Soca and Calypso. The recent changes in Canada's immigration laws have seen several prominent music artistes from the Commonwealth Caribbean like David Rudder and Anslem Douglas resettle with their families to Canada and developed a burgeoning Caribbean music industry based in Canada.

This trend has also been reinforced by a decrease in the industry in the New York City area, mainly spurred by factors like the rebranding of the 30+-year-old Caribbean radio station WLIB 1090-AM by Inner City Broadcasting Corporation in 2004. The ICB rebranding was a tremendous setback to the Caribbean community and, in essence, splintered the Caribbean music industry again across the New York City metropolitan area. In Canada, stations like Flow FM and CHIN, both located in Toronto, Ontario have served to bind the Caribbean music industry with their regularly rotated scheduling for Soca and Calypso music. During this time, several of the leading Caribbean music industry DJs (who are based in Ontario) took to the air and launched several new songs or mixes. Some song mixes have been entered into various Caribbean Carnivals back in the Caribbean region and created awareness in the Caribbean of new Soca and Calypso talent based in Canada.

=== Chinese music ===
Chinese music was brought to Canada over 100 years ago, with touring Canadian opera troupes entertaining the lumber camp, mine, or railway workers. Within the communities, many amateur music clubs performed Cantonese instrumental music and Cantonese opera. Since the 1980s, big waves of Chinese immigrants brought many professional musicians to Canada. Today Chinese music in Canada is a shared heritage between people from China, Taiwan, Hong Kong, and South Asia. The second and third generations of Canadian Chinese are also discovering their roots in Chinese music. The Canadian major centers for Chinese music are Vancouver, Toronto, and Montreal. There are also many professional and amateur musicians in other cities across Canada.

Vancouver's Chinese music community includes many professional ensembles: Orchid Ensemble, Silk Road Music, Vancouver Chinese Music Ensemble, BC Chinese Music Ensemble, and Red Chamber. Professional individuals include erhu players Lan Tung, Jirong Huang, Nicole Lee, Rong Jung, Yun Song, and Yang Zhong Cai; pipa players Qiu Xia He and Guilian Liu; zheng players Mei Han, Wei Li, Gelling Jiang; ruan player Zhimin Yu, dizi player Jianmin Pan and Charlie Lui, suona player Zhong Xi Wu. Many amateur musicians in Vancouver join the BC Chinese Music Orchestra.

In addition, Chinese musicians in Vancouver create cross-cultural projects with non-Chinese musicians/instruments: Proliferasian (Chinese, jazz, free improvisation), Birds of Paradox (Chinese, jazz, Indian), Mozaico Flamenco Dance Theatre (Chinese, flamenco), Oliver Yu Duo (ruan and classical guitar), Silk Road Music collaborates with Brazil guitarist Celso Manchado. Vancouver Inter-Cultural Orchestra is a large ensemble of Chinese, Vietnamese, Iranian, Middle Eastern, African, Irish, Indian....musicians and instruments.

To celebrate the vibrant community and this diversity of practices, Sound of Dragon Society has been formed in 2013 to produce Vancouver's first festival featuring Chinese instrumental music: Sound of Dragon – preserve heritage, seek innovation, on 9–11 May 2014 at the Roundhouse Community Centre.

== See also ==
- Canadian patriotic music
- Canadian rock
- Canadian music genres
- Juno Award
- Western Canadian Music Awards
- Polaris Music Prize
- East Coast Music Association
- Canadian Music Hall of Fame
- Canada's Walk of Fame
