= Afrophilya =

Music festival in Montreal, Quebec, Canada

Afrophilya (sometimes spelt Afro-phil-ya, derived from Afrophile) is an international music festival founded in Montreal, Quebec, Canada. The festival was launched in February 2011 at Le piano rouge soul lounge to coincide with the celebration of Black History Month. Afrophilya is a contemporary view of Afro Culture and celebrates the artistic contributions of people of African descent to world culture.

== Notable performers ==
Notable artists who have performed at the festival include; international contemporary jazz stars José James, Kris Bowers, South African Lorraine Klaasen daughter of Nelson Mandela's favourite singer Thandi Klaasen (who also performed at the 2012 Afrophilya Festival), Dessy Di Lauro - Delirium (Cirque du Soleil) and Ric'key Pageot (keyboardist for Madonna, Jill Scott, Earth, Wind & Fire), G'nee (La Voix 2014), Sarah MK (Montreal International Jazz Festival 2012), Warren "Slim" Williams (performed with The Spinners, The Drifters and The Temptations), 2005 Maple Blues Awards winner Dawn Tyler Watson, Henri-Pierre Noël, and many more.
