= Afropolitan =

Term expressing broad African cultural identity

Afropolitan is a term constructed from the name Africa and the ancient Greek word πολίτης ('politis'), meaning 'citizen' (itself from polis, 'city'). It is an attempt at redefining African phenomena by, on the one hand, placing emphasis on ordinary citizens' experiences in Africa and, on the other hand, reconceptualizing the African Diaspora's relationship with the African continent. Afropolitanism is used and defined in various ways. The novelist Taiye Selasi and the political theorist Achille Mbembe are immediately associated with the coinage of the term and its fundamental theorization.

== Overview ==
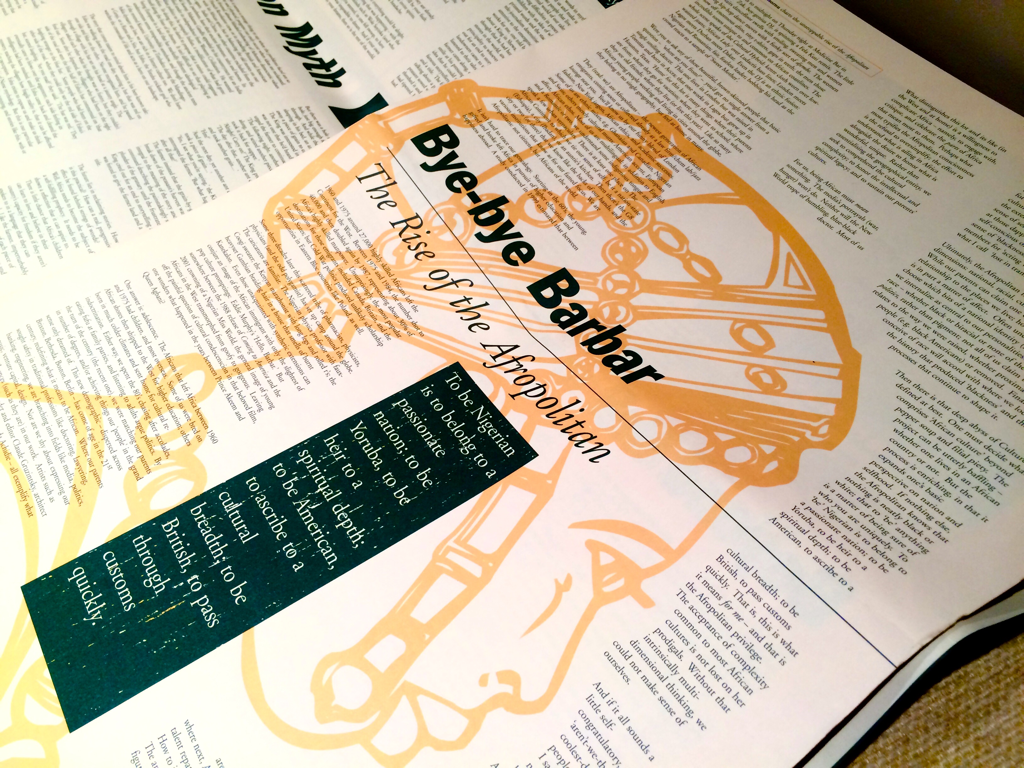
Bye-bye Barbar, the Rise of the Afropolitan, as published in the LIP Magazine #5

The term was popularized in 2005 by a widely disseminated essay, 'Bye-Bye, Barbar: The Rise of The Afropolitan' by the author Taiye Selasi. Originally published in March 2005 in the Africa Issue of the LIP Magazine, the essay defines an Afropolitan identity, sensibility and experience. The critiques of the Afropolitan, as portrayed by Selasi in Bye-Bye, Barbar, condemn its elitism and class biased approach. Susanne Gehrmann states that Selasi's Afropolitan "is addicted to urban hip life" and "international careers". However, the essay is important in discussing where emigrants of Africa fit into the spectrum of African. Knudsen and Rahbek suggest that Bye-Bye, Barbar "is an integral part [in the] ongoing conversation about the relationship between identity and individuality" in the way that it "speaks to the individual" who may feel alone in the sense that they do not have "labels or identities" to understand their positioning in the world. In 2006 the essay was republished by the Michael Stevenson Gallery in Cape Town and in 2007 by The Nation in Nairobi, whereupon it became popular.

Mbembe’s short piece “Afropolitanism” followed two years after "Bye-Bye, Barbar (Or: What is an Afropolitan?)". It was a contribution to an essay collection entitled Africa Remix – Contemporary Art of a Continent that accompanied a touring exhibition of the same name. Mbembe presents his idea of Afropolitanism as a thoroughly African way of being. This Afropolitanism includes a critical examination of Africa and the world. Human mobility is central to Selasi's and Mbembe's conceptions of Afropolitanism. Unlike Selasi, whose contemporary notion of Afropolitanism only considers the last couple of decades and voluntary movement, Mbembe finds forced movement – of which the transatlantic slave trade is an extreme example – as capable of leading to an Afropolitan way of being as well. Mbembe asserts that people on the African continent have always mixed elements of different cultures, beliefs and ways of being. Movement (to, from and across the continent) and encounters naturally lead to Afropolitanism’s essential characteristic: a “broad-mindedness”, which enables creative and critical thinking with relevance for local and global contexts.

After the circulation of Selasi and Mbembe’s essays on Afropolitanism, the term has gained visibility mainly through the literary works of Chimamanda Ngozi Adichie, Teju Cole, NoViolet Bulawayo and a few other celebrity authors. Several communities, artists, and publications now use the label, most notably The Afropolitan Network, The Afropolitan Experience, The Afropolitan Legacy Theatre, The Afropolitan Collection, Afropolitan Berlin and South Africa's The Afropolitan Magazine. In June 2011 The Victoria and Albert Museum hosted "Friday Late: Afropolitans" in London. In September 2011 the Houston Museum of African American Culture convened the symposium "Africans in America: The New Beat of Afropolitans", featuring author Teju Cole, musician Derrick Ashong and artist Wangechi Mutu alongside Selasi. Ashong released an online album with the group Soulfège in 2011, titled "AFropolitan." Blitz the Ambassador proposed in 2013 to release the CD "Afropolitan Dreams". Ade Bantu is the co-creator of the monthly concert series Afropolitan Vibes which holds at Freedom Park Lagos, Nigeria.

The Afropolitan discourse is dominated by a few highly visible spokespersons. In relation to the works of the better-known artists, Afropolitanism has been discussed predominantly with reference to Africa, the US and the back and forth between them, which conveys a diminishing picture of the actual variety and complexity of Afropolitan expressions in different contexts. But more variety can be found: Birgit Neumann's essay on Yvonne Adhiambo Owuor's novel Dust addresses the almost entirely overlooked circulation of Africans inside of Africa. The novel Biskaya by Black German author SchwarzRund offers a queer perspective and takes Afropolitanism to the German context. M. G. Vassanji's novel And Home was Kariakoo invites discussion about the representation of Asians in the Afropolitan discussion.

== Afropolitan Literature ==
A new wave of literature written by African writers, including recent African immigrants to the West, claims to be redefining the African experience in today's world. The most famous Afropolitan novels are Chimamanda Ngozie Adichie's Americanah, Teju Cole's Open City.

== See also ==
- Afrophilia
- Afrophilya
- Afrofuturism
- African Futurism
- Afropean
