= Canadian patriotic music =

Patriotic music in Canada dates back over 200 years as a distinct category from British or French patriotism, preceding the first legal steps to independence by over 50 years. The earliest, "The Bold Canadian", was written in 1812.

== Canadian anthems ==
=== National anthem ===
"O Canada" is the national anthem of Canada. Calixa Lavallée wrote the music in 1880 as a setting of a French Canadian patriotic poem composed by poet and judge Sir Adolphe-Basile Routhier. "O Canada" served as one of two de facto national anthems after 1939, officially becoming Canada's singular national anthem in 1980, when the Act of Parliament making it so received Royal Assent and became effective on July 1 as part of that year's Dominion Day celebrations. The national anthem is routinely played before sporting events involving Canadian teams.

=== Royal anthem ===
"God Save the King" is the royal anthem of Canada. There are various claims of authorship and several previous songs of similar style, but the first published version of what is almost the present tune appeared in 1744 in Thesaurus Musicus. The song has been used in Canada since the era when it was a collection of British colonies and "God Save the King" (or "God Save the Queen" during the reign of a female monarch) was played in honour of the British monarch. It has remained in use through Canada's progression to independence, becoming eventually one of the country's two de facto national anthems. After "O Canada" was in 1980 proclaimed the national anthem, "God Save the King" has been designated as the royal anthem, played in the presence of the Canadian monarch, other members of the Royal Family, and as part of the salute accorded to the Governor General of Canada and provincial lieutenant governors. It can also be played on other occasions.

== Provincial anthems ==
=== Alberta ===
"Alberta" is the official provincial song of Alberta, adopted in preparation for the province's centennial celebrations in 2005. The song was selected following a competition mandated by the Alberta Official Song Act, introduced in the Legislative Assembly of Alberta in May 2001 and passed in November.

=== Ontario ===
"A Place to Stand, a Place to Grow (Ontari-ari-ari-o!)" is an unofficial anthem of Ontario. The song was written by Dolores Claman, with English lyrics by Richard Morris, French lyrics by Larry Trudel, and orchestrations by Jerry Toth. It was commissioned by the Progressive Conservative government of John Robarts as the signature tune for a movie of the same name that was featured at the Ontario pavilion at Expo 67, the World's Fair held in Montreal, Quebec, in Canada's Centennial year. It was used again in the Ontario's segment of the short film A Place to Stand, which won the 1967 Academy Award for Live Action Short Film.

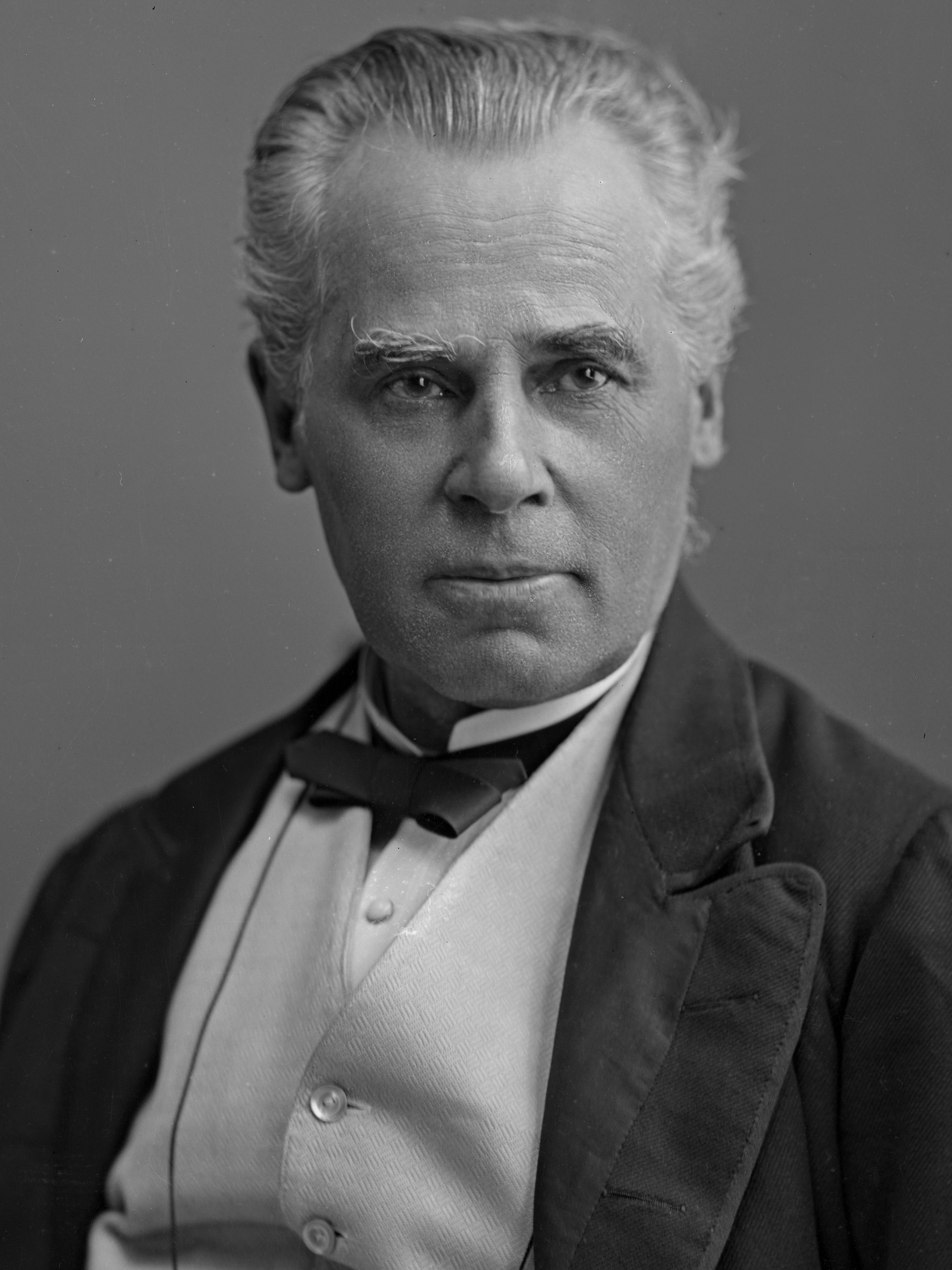
George-Étienne Cartier c. 1871

=== Québec ===
"Gens du pays" has been called the unofficial national anthem of Quebec. Written by poet, songwriter, and avowed Quebec nationalist Gilles Vigneault (with music co-written by Gaston Rochon), it was first performed by Vigneault on June 24, 1975, during a concert on Montreal's Mount Royal at that year's Fête nationale du Québec ceremony. It quickly became a folk classic, and it has been played frequently at Fête nationale ceremonies since then. The chorus is by far the most famous part of the song: Gens du pays, c'est votre tour / De vous laisser parler d'amour, which, translated, says, "Folks of the land, it is your turn to let yourselves talk of love." At this time, Vigneault invited Quebecers to use this song when someone celebrate a birthday, changing "Gens du pays" by "Mon cher (name)...". In many families, this song can be heard when the cake approaches.

"Ô Canada! mon pays, mes amours" is a French-Canadian song, written by George-Étienne Cartier first sung in 1834, during a patriotic banquet of the Saint-Jean-Baptiste Society held in Montreal. The words were first published in the June 29, 1835, edition of La Minerve and its music in Le Chansonnier des collèges in 1850; it is uncertain when the lyrics and music were put together, probably by Ernest Gagnon sometime between 1850 and 1868. The music currently used was composed by Jean-Baptiste Labelle.

=== New Brunswick ===
New Brunswick does not have an official or popular unofficial anthem, though the instrumental fiddle tune St. Anne's Reel, popular in Eastern Canada, Ireland, and the bluegrass music of the United States has been offered.

=== Nova Scotia ===
Though without official anthem, "Farewell to Nova Scotia", a popular folk song from the province, is often considered equivalent to an anthem for Nova Scotia or the Maritimes as a whole. It is a rendition of the 1791 Scottish folk song "The Soldier's Adieu", printed in 1803 in a Glasgow newspaper and attributed to Robert Tannahill. When Nova Scotians began to adapt the song is unknown. In the 1930s, folklorist Helen Creighton collected versions of the folk song from different communities along the eastern shore of Nova Scotia. The song had a resurgence when Halifax CBC TV show Singalong Jubilee used Catherine McKinnon's version as the title theme.

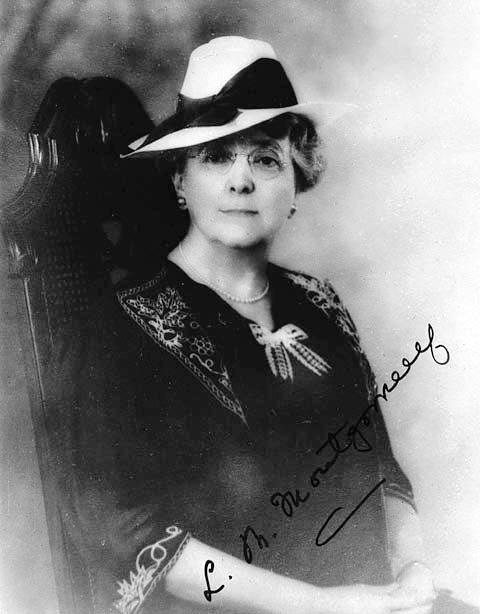
Lucy Maud Montgomery c. 1935

=== Prince Edward Island ===
"The Island Hymn" is the official provincial anthem of Prince Edward Island. The hymn's lyrics were written in 1908 by Lucy Maud Montgomery, with music written by Lawrence W. Watson. It was performed for the first time in public on May 22, 1908. The manuscript music, dated October 27, 1908, and correspondence relating to it are displayed at Green Gables House, Cavendish. The Island Hymn was adopted as the provincial anthem by the legislative assembly on May 7, 2010. The Provincial Anthem Act includes a French version of the Island Hymn, adapted by Raymond J. Arsenault of Abram-Village and called L'hymne de l'Île.

=== Newfoundland and Labrador ===
"Ode to Newfoundland" is the official provincial anthem of Newfoundland and Labrador. Governor Sir Cavendish Boyle composed it in 1902 as a four-verse poem entitled Newfoundland. It was set to the music of British composer Sir Hubert Parry, a personal friend of Boyle, who composed two settings. On May 20, 1904, it was chosen as Newfoundland's official national anthem (national as a self-governing Dominion of the British Empire on par with Canada). This distinction was dropped when Newfoundland joined Canada in 1949. Three decades later, in 1980, the province re-adopted the song as an official provincial anthem.

== Early patriotic songs ==
"The Bold Canadian", also known as "Come all ye bold Canadians", is a Canadian patriotic song that originated during the War of 1812. The lyrics celebrate the Canadian conquest of Detroit in the Michigan Territory. It is believed that the song was written by a private from the Third York Militia's First Flank Company named Cornelius Flummerfelt. Until 1907, the song was only passed on in oral traditions, with a few different versions gaining popularity. Full versions of the song were not published until 1927 when the Ontario Historical Society published two different versions of the song. A third version was published in 1960. All three varied, with different stanzas and order of stanzas.

"The Maple Leaf Forever" is a patriotic song written by Alexander Muir in 1867, often considered to be an unofficial anthem. It was in consideration for the official national anthem; however, due to its strongly pro-British and Anglo-Celtic lyrics, and as no French version was ever published, the anthem was unpopular with French Canadians, thus preventing it from official recognition. Conversely, "Vive la Canadienne" is a Francophone patriotic song, derived from "Par derrièr chez mon père", a French folk song, which was widely used as an unofficial national anthem by French-Canadians until the adoption of O Canada. Both songs, however, remain closely associated with Canadian identity and are occasionally publicly performed in patriotic settings, such as when The Maple Leaf Forever was performed at the closing ceremony of the 2010 Winter Olympics, and Vive la Canadienne was played by bands as a tribute to care workers during the COVID-19 pandemic.

La feuille d'érable (the maple leaf) is a patriotic French-Canadian song written by Albert Viau for a song book named La bonne chanson. The maple leaf being, originally, a symbol of the French-Canadians adopted in 1834 by the St-Jean Baptiste Society. It is also used even today as a pre-game anthem in Theatrical Improvisation leagues across Québec.

== Popular patriotic songs ==
"Something to Sing About" is a patriotic song written by folk singer Oscar Brand in 1963 that sings the praises of the many different regions of Canada. It was used as the theme for Let's Sing Out, a folk music show that aired on CTV and CBC and was the theme song for the Canadian pavilion at Expo 67, and there was once a movement for it to chosen as Canada's national anthem in 1965.

Canadiana Suite is a 1964 Canadian jazz album by pianist and composer Oscar Peterson. Each song is inspired by his travels through Canada, ordered geographically from east ("Ballad to the East," about the Maritimes) to west ("Land of the Misty Giants," the Rockies). Peterson described the album as "my musical portrait of the Canada I love." Canadiana Suite was inducted into the Canadian Songwriters Hall of Fame in 2008.

"Canada", also known as "Ca-na-da", "The Centennial Song", or "Une chanson du centenaire" in French, is a 1967 marching-style song written by Bobby Gimby to celebrate Canada's centennial year and Expo 67. It was commissioned by the Centennial Commission (a special Federal Government agency), and written in both of Canada's official languages, English and French. The song's recording was performed by the Young Canada Singers, two groups of children – one that sang the French lyrics, led by Montreal conductor Raymond Berthiaume, and another that sang in English, under conductor Laurie Bower in Toronto. The musical score was composed by Ben McPeek. The single went on to be the most successful single in Canada in 1967, selling a then unprecedented 270,000 copies. It was No. 1 for 2 weeks on the RPM Top 100 Singles in Canada in April 1967.

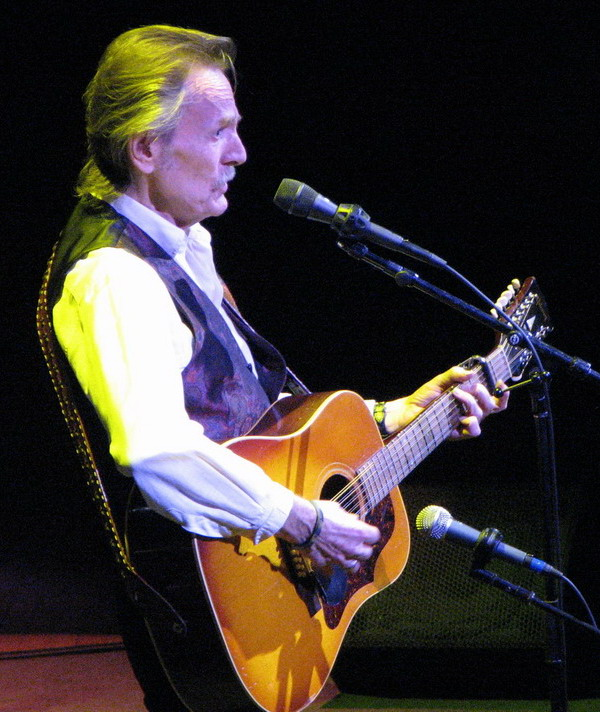
Gordon Lightfoot c. 2008

"Canadian Railroad Trilogy" is a Canadian folk song by Gordon Lightfoot describing the building of the Canadian Pacific Railway. This song was commissioned by the CBC for a special broadcast on January 1, 1967, to start Canada's Centennial year. It appeared on Lightfoot's The Way I Feel album later in the same year. Lightfoot re-recorded the track on his 1975 compilation album, Gord's Gold, with full orchestration (arranged by Lee Holdridge). A live version also appears on his 1969 album Sunday Concert. Additionally, the song was covered by John Mellencamp, George Hamilton IV, and James Keelaghan who performed the song on the Lightfoot tribute album, Beautiful. In 2001, Gordon Lightfoot's "Canadian Railroad Trilogy" was honoured as one of the Canadian MasterWorks by the Audio-Visual Preservation Trust of Canada.

"The Hockey Theme" is a Canadian instrumental theme song written in 1968 by Dolores Claman and orchestrated by Jerry Toth. It gained popularity and wide public association with Canada's national winter sport, ice hockey, as the theme of CBC Television's Hockey Night in Canada and Télévision de Radio-Canada's La Soirée du hockey from 1968 until 2008. In 2008 the CBC announced that the negotiations to renew their licence or purchase the theme had been unsuccessful and that they would run a national contest to find a new theme song. The rights were then purchased by rival broadcaster CTV in perpetuity. Beginning in the fall of 2008 the theme could be heard on hockey broadcasts on the CTV-owned TSN and RDS sports channels.

"Northwest Passage" is a 1981 a cappella folk song written and performed by Stan Rogers. The song commemorates Franklin's lost expedition by sea through the Canadian Arctic and finds parallels in the narrator's travel by land through the Canadian Prairies. The song appears on an album of the same name released by Rogers in 1981, and is considered one of the classic songs in Canadian music history. In the 2005 CBC Radio One series 50 Tracks: The Canadian Version, "Northwest Passage" ranked fourth. It was referred to as one of Canada's unofficial anthems by then Prime Minister Stephen Harper, and then Governor General Adrienne Clarkson quoted the song both in her first official address and in her speech at the dedication of the new Canadian embassy in Berlin. Other notable songs by Stan Rogers with patriotic themes include "Barrett's Privateers."

The Tragically Hip, a Canadian rock band active from 1984 until the death of lead singer and lyricist Gord Downie in 2017, were among the best-selling Canadian musicians in Canada. A widely noted signature element of the Hip's collective and Downie's solo catalogues was the extent to which they addressed Canadian themes. The Tragically Hip's relationship with patriotism and nationalism was complicated. "I’m not a nationalist," Downie told his biographer Michael Barclay; Downie said this "firmly," Barclay notes. "I started using Canadian references not just for their own sake, but because I wanted to pick up my birthright, which is this massive country full of stories," Downie continued. In the National Post, Dave Kaufman wrote "Although Downie sings of Canada, his songs are by no means patriotic, or no more than in the way that we're all influenced by where we're from. The band have never been so obvious as to drape themselves in a Canadian flag, but instead, they evoke that shared experience of what it's meant for many of us to grow up in Canada." In the Journal of Canadian Studies, political scientist Gregory Millard discussed the paradoxical question of how "deeply ambiguous and often critical references to Canada sufficed to raise The Hip to an extraordinary status as icons of Canadian nationalism." Millard concluded that "Canada's position as a culturally peripheral nation is the key to explaining the incongruous appropriation of the Hip’s work for nationalist self-celebration."

"Remembrance Day" is a 1987 rock song by Bryan Adams from his album Into the Fire. While commending the work of veterans it also carried an anti-war message.

"Rise Again" is a 1993 Canadian country and folk single recorded by The Rankin Family from their album North Country, written by composer Leon Dubinsky, originally for a 1984 local stage musical revue. A song about resilience created during an economic crisis in the Rankins' and Dubinsky's home region Cape Breton Island, it reached number 12 on the RPM national singles chart, and became recognized as an unofficial anthem of Cape Breton.

"A Pittance of Time," a 2002 folk song by Terry Kelly, decried a real-life incident the singer-songwriter experienced where a man failed to observe the two-minute silence to commemorate Canada's military deaths on Remembrance Day.

In "The Rest of My Life", a 2003 rock song by Sloan and the first single from their album Action Pact, the narrator proclaims he will live the rest of his life in Canada. "Such sentiments may explain why Sloan is a bigger draw north of the border than down here," The Washington Post said in their review of the album.

"I Want You to Live," a 2007 country single by George Canyon from his 2006 album Somebody Wrote Love, describes the bereavement of a woman whose husband suddenly dies. Canyon's interpretation of the song is based on military remembrance and its official music video, filmed at CFB Trenton, is explicitly about Canadian military remembrance. One of the Canadian soldiers in the video soon afterwards died in combat in the War in Afghanistan.

"Oh... Canada," a 2009 Canadian hip hop single by Classified from his album Self Explanatory, lists reasons to be proud of Canada and interpolates segments from "O Canada". It reached number 14 on the Canadian Hot 100 and was certified Platinum in Canada.

"Highway of Heroes," a 2010 rock single by The Trews, was written to commemorate Captain Nichola Goddard, who died on duty in the War in Afghanistan in 2006. The first female Canadian Armed Forces member killed during combat duty, Goddard had been a classmate and friend of members of the band. The title refers to the section of Ontario Highway 401 where the remains of Canadian service members fallen overseas are driven from the military airport at CFB Trenton to the Ontario coroner's office in Toronto. "Highway of Heroes" was certified Platinum in Canada.

== First Nations patriotic songs ==
"O Canada" has been performed in some First Nation languages during the opening of a few national events. During the opening ceremonies of the 1988 Winter Olympics in Calgary, "O Canada" was sung in the southern Tutchone language by Yukon native Daniel Tlen. At a National Hockey League (NHL) game in Calgary on February 1, 2007, young Cree singer Akina Shirt became the first person to perform "O Canada" in the Cree language at such an event.

"Land of the Silver Birch" is thought of as a Canadian folk song, written first as a poem by Pauline Johnson. It is associated with camping and canoeing. Its subject matter is a romanticized vision of nature and the land from the perspective of an indigenous person, but it remains popular with the non-Aboriginal majority in Canada. The song appears in the Paul Gross film Men with Brooms (2002). The song was partly re-written in 2005 by Canadian folk singer Dickson Reid and released on his debut album, Sugar in the Snow.

== Other patriotic songs ==
- "The Banks of Newfoundland" was composed by Chief Justice Francis Forbes sometime around 1820, and was adopted as the authorized march of the Royal Newfoundland Regiment.
- A Canadianized version of Woody Guthrie's "This Land Is Your Land" was released in 1955 by the folk group the Travellers.
- American country musician Lee Greenwood released "God Bless Canada" in 1989, an adaptation of his 1984 American patriotic song "God Bless the USA."

== See also ==
- Canadian identity
- Canadian values
- Canadian folklore
- List of anthems of non-sovereign countries, regions and territories
- List of historical national anthems
- A Mari Usque Ad Mare
- Music of Canadian cultures
