= The Banks of Newfoundland =

"The Banks Of Newfoundland" is the earliest Newfoundland composition set down in music notation. It was composed by Chief Justice Francis Forbes in 1820 and published in a piano arrangement by Oliver Ditson of Boston. Originally composed as a dance, it was treated as a march by the soldiers of Royal Newfoundland Regiment during World War I; it later became the Regiment's authorized march.

It has also been associated with the Royal St. John's Regatta since its early days. As a Regatta tune it is more popularly known as "Up The Pond", and is traditionally played as the crews pass the bandstand on their return to the stakes. It was later made the official tune of the Regatta.

An entirely different "The Banks of Newfoundland" is a song in ballad form, created as a parody of "Van Dieman's Land." It voices the lament of a sailor on a voyage from Liverpool to New York, on which one must pass the cold Grand Banks.

== Lyrics ==
THE BANKS OF NEWFOUNDLAND

You bully boys of Liverpool
And I'll have you to beware,
When you sail on them packet ships,
no dungaree jackets wear;
But have a big monkey jacket
all ready to your hand,
For there blows some cold nor'westers
on the Banks of Newfoundland.

We'll scrape her and we'll scrub her
with holy stone and sand,
For there blows some cold nor'westers
on the Banks of Newfoundland.

We had Jack Lynch from Ballynahinch,
Mike Murphy and some more,
And I tell you by's, they suffered like hell
on the way to Baltimore;
They pawned their gear in Liverpool
and they sailed as they did stand,
But there blows some cold nor'westers
on the Banks of Newfoundland.

We'll scrape her and we'll scrub her
with holy stone and sand,
For there blows some cold nor'westers
on the Banks of Newfoundland.

Now the mate he stood on the fo'c'sle head
and loudly he did roar,
Now rattle her in me lucky lads,
you're bound for America's shore;
Come wipe the blood off that dead man's face
and haul or you'll be damned,
But there blows some cold nor'westers
on the Banks of Newfoundland.

We'll scrape her and we'll scrub her
with holy stone and sand,
For there blows some cold nor'westers
on the Banks of Newfoundland.

So now it's reef and reif, me boys
With the Canvas frozen hard
and this mountain pass every Mother's son
on a ninety foot topsail yard
nevermind about boots and oilskins
but holler or you'll be damned
But there blows some cold nor'westers
on the Banks of Newfoundland.

We'll scrape her and we'll scrub her
with holy stone and sand,
And we'll think of them cold nor'westers
on the Banks of Newfoundland.

So now we're off the Hook, me boys,
and the land is white with snow,
And soon we'll see the pay table
and we'll spend the whole night below;
And on the docks, come down in flocks,
those pretty girls will say,
Ah, It's snugger with me than on the sea,
on the Banks of Newfoundland.

We'll scrape her and we'll scrub her
with holy stone and sand,
And we'll think of them cold nor'westers
on the Banks of Newfoundland.

== See also ==
- Canadian patriotic music
- List of Newfoundland songs
