= A Pittance of Time =

Song by Terry Kelly
- Released: 2002
- Label: Jefter Publishing
- Songwriter: Terry Kelly

"A Pittance of Time" is a 2002 Canadian folk song by Terry Kelly and produced by Jefter Publishing – SOCAN. Kelly's intent in writing the song was to remind people to observe the two-minute silence on Remembrance Day, after a man in the same shop as him failed to do so.

== History ==
Kelly was prompted to write "A Pittance of Time" by an incident that occurred at a pharmacy on November 11, 1999. While Kelly observed the customary two-minute Remembrance Day silence at 11:00 a.m., he overheard another customer loudly demand that the clerk proceed with his transactions. The man's daughter rebuked him as they exited the store, saying, "Daddy, you were supposed to be quiet through that time." Incensed by the man's lack of respect, Kelly wrote the song in hopes that it would help people to understand the importance of the two-minute silence.

Kelly recorded the song in 2002 with the lyrics being written to remind people of the sacrifices that the British Empire and Commonwealth forces made during the war for their freedom. Kelly also wrote a French language version of the song titled "C'est Si Peu de Temps".

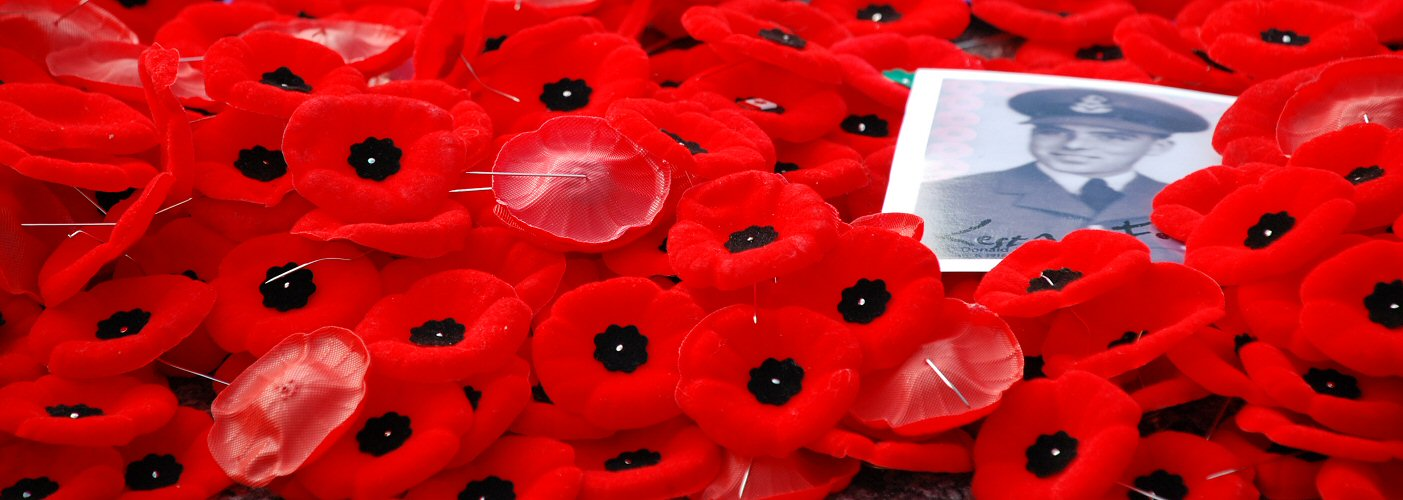
The Canadian Remembrance poppies

The song was also used as the inspiration for a campaign for Canadian shops not to put up Christmas displays until after Remembrance Day. It was led by the businessman and Dragon's Den panellist W. Brett Wilson who was inspired by "A Pittance of Time" and felt that the excessively early Christmas displays were disrespecting the memory of the veterans. He called for shops to wait until after 11 November before putting up Christmas displays.
