= The Bold Canadian =

Canadian patriotic song

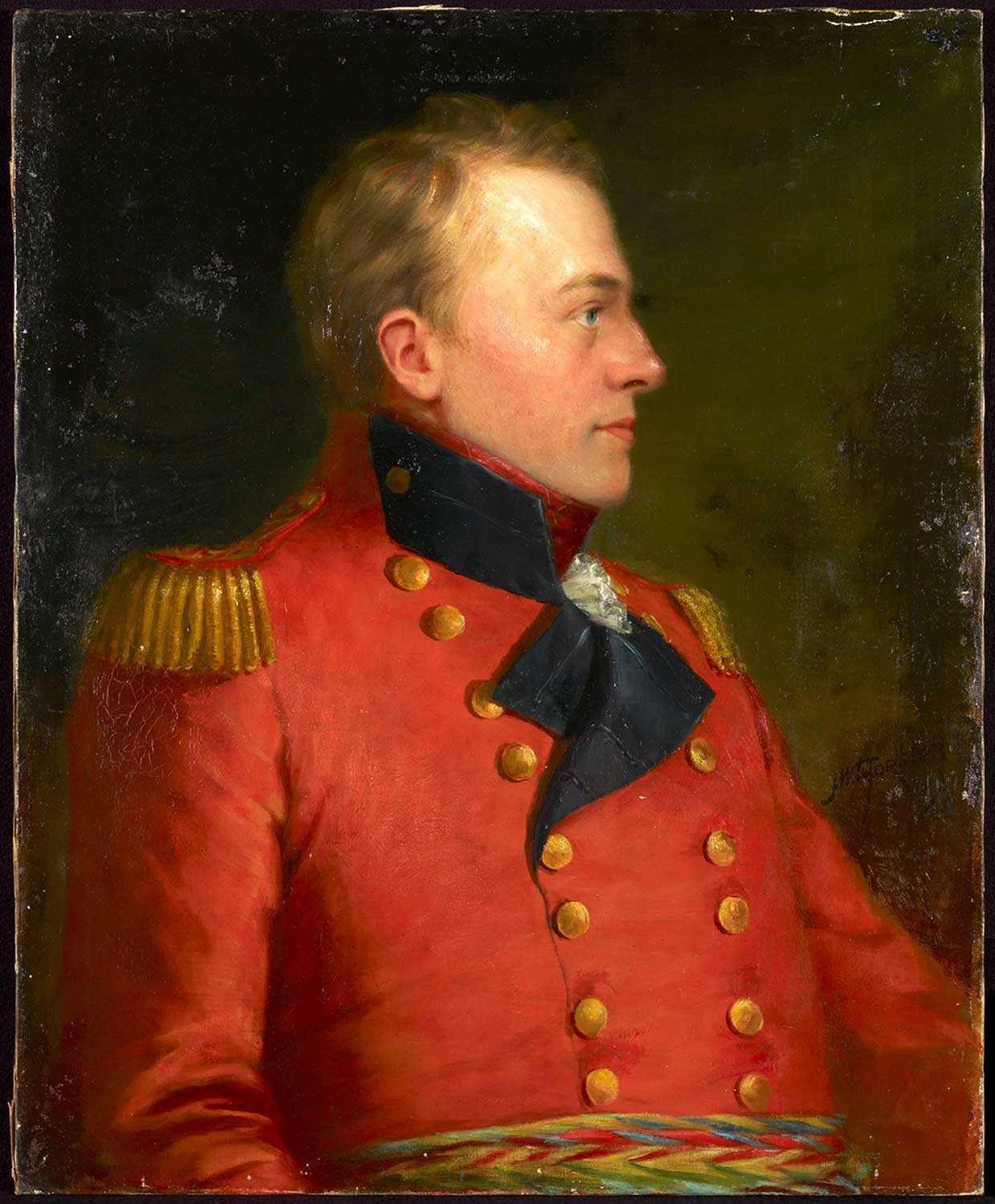
Isaac Brock, the British officer praised in The Bold Canadian

"The Bold Canadian" is a Canadian patriotic song that originated during the War of 1812. It celebrated the British capture of Detroit in Michigan Territory.

== History ==
It is believed that "The Bold Canadian" was written by a private from the 3rd York Militia's First Flank Company named Cornelius Flummerfelt, who wrote the lines while marching in the Detroit campaign, or on the way back to York, Upper Canada. The song was used to further increase the numbers of Canadian Militia to fight during the war.

Although composed in late 1812, the first publication of the song was not until 1907, when the Niagara Historical Society printed part of the song in a pamphlet about Isaac Brock. Until 1907, the song was passed down in oral traditions; therefore, different versions of the song came to be. Full versions of the song were not published until 1927 when the Ontario Historical Society published two different versions of the song. In 1960, a third version was published; all three varied, with different stanzas and order of stanzas.

Although unpublished, the song remained popular in Canada throughout the nineteenth century, while a comparable American song, "The Hunters of Kentucky", lost its popularity by the end of the Jacksonian Era.

== Lyrics ==
Come all you brave Canadians
I'd have you lend an ear
Unto a simple ditty
That will your spirits cheer,

Concerning an engagement
We had at Sandwich town―
The courage of those Yankee boys
So bravely we pulled down.

Their purpose to invade us
Was to kill and to destroy
To distress our wives and children
And cause us much annoy.

Our countrymen were filled
With sorrow, grief and woe
To think that they would fall
By an unnatural foe.

At length our bold commander
Sir Isaac Brock by name
Took shipping at Niagara
And unto York he came.

He said: "My valiant heroes,
Will you go along with me
To fight those Yankee boys
In the west of Canady."

"O yes," we all replied,
"We'll go along with you
Our knapsacks on our back
And make no more ado."

Our fire-locks then we shouldered
And straight we marched away
With firm determination
To shew them British play.

Yes our fire-locks we shouldered
Forward our course to steer
To meet and fight the invader
With neither dread nor fear.

At Sandwich we arrived
Each man with his supply
With bold determination
To conquer or to die.

Our general sent a flag
And thus to them did say:
"Surrender now your garrison
Or I'll fire on you this day."

Our troops then marched over
Our artillery we did land
And marched straight upon their town
Like an undaunted band.

They refused to surrender
They chose to stand their ground
We opened then our guns
And gave them fire all around.

The Yankee boys began to fear
And their blood to run cold
To see us marching forward
So courageous and bold.

Their general sent a flag of truce
For quarter then they call:
"Hold your hand, brave British boys,
I fear you'll slay us all."

"Our town is at your command
Our garrison likewise."
They brought their arms and grounded them
Right down before our eyes.

And they were all made prisoners
On board of ship they went
And from the town of Sandwich
To Quebec they were sent.

We guarded them from Sandwich
Safe down unto Fort George
And them within the town of York
So safely we did lodge.

And we're arrived at home
Each man without a wound
And the fame of this great conquest
Will through the province sound.

Success unto the volunteers
Who thus their rights maintain
Lifewise their bold commander
Sir Isaac Brock by name.

And being all united
This is the song we'll sing
Success unto Great Britain
And may God Save the King.

== Alternative lyrics ==
Come all ye bold Canadians,
I'd have you lend an ear
Unto a short ditty
Which will your spirits cheer,

Concerning an engagement
We had at Detroit town,
The pride of those Yankee boys
So bravely we took down.

The Yankees did invade us,
To kill and to destroy,
And to distress our country,
Our peace for to annoy,

Our countrymen were filled
With sorrow, grief and woe,
To think that they should fall
By such an unnatural foe.

Come all ye bold Canadians,
Enlisted in the cause,
To defend your country,
And to maintain your laws;

Being all united,
This is the song we'll sing:
Success onto Great Britain

And God save the King.

== Geoff Berner's "Come All Ye Bold Canadians (Song of the War of 1812)" lyrics ==
In 2011 Canadian folk-singer Geoff Berner recorded, "Come All Ye Bold Canadians (Song of the War of 1812)," as part of Henry Adam Svec's recording project.

The perfidious rebels snuck
across our border by the score.
They raped the nuns on tables,
threw the babies to the floor. (What cads!)

But invincible General Brock was ready
when he heard the call.
He drove them back and now we'll chase them
over hedge and wall.

So come all ye bold Canadians
and gird your trusty might.
We'll make the American libertines
regret they picked a fight.

For order and good government
we'll fight for what is right.
Come all ye bold Canadians
and gird your trusty might.

Around the world Canadians
are feared as soldiers bold.
Loyal and obedient,
we'll kill and die when told. (Yes sir!)

Liberty is not for me,
I know my rightful place.
Upon my knees before our king,
who God enthroned with grace.

So come all ye bold Canadians
and gird your trusty might.
We'll make the American libertines
regret they picked a fight.

For order and good government
we'll fight for what is right.
Come all ye bold Canadians
and gird your trusty might.

No matter where they run and hide
we'll chase them down like dogs.
We'll burn the hated White House down
with kerosene and logs. (Chop the logs!)

A godless slave of liberty
deserves just what he gets.
Their livestock and their unborn brats
will feel our bayonets.

So come all ye bold Canadians
and gird your trusty might.
We'll make the American libertines
regret they picked a fight.

For order and good government
we'll fight for what is right.
Come all ye bold Canadians

and gird your trusty might.

== See also ==
- Canadian patriotic music
