= Farewell to Nova Scotia =

Popular folk song from Nova Scotia, Canada

Song
- Language: English
- Genre: Folk, Canadian folk song

"Farewell to Nova Scotia" is a popular folk song from Nova Scotia, Canada. It was adapted from the Scottish lament "The Soldier's Adieu" written by Robert Tannahill. It was written sometime before or during World War I and popularized in 1964 when Catherine McKinnon used it as the theme song for the Halifax-based CBC TV program, Singalong Jubilee.

Catalogued as Roud Folk Song Index No. 384, both the tune and lyrics are public domain.

== History ==
The 1791 Scottish folk song "The Soldier's Adieu" was printed in 1803 in a Glasgow newspaper and attributed to Robert Tannahill. Philip A. Ramsay's 1838 edition of The Works of Robert Tannahill. With Life of the Author printed the first stanza of the song. Then Alexander Whitelaw published it in the 1843 edition of The Book of Scottish Song. David Semple then published it in his 1874 edition of The Poems and Songs of Robert Tannahill.

Folklorist Helen Creighton first collected the song in 1933 from Annie (Bayers) Greenough in West Petpeswick, Nova Scotia.

A version of "The Soldier's Adieu" was also recorded in the 1940s in Quebec titled, "On the Banks of Jeddore".

The Quebec duo "Les Karrik" recorded a French version titled "La Chanson de l'Acadien" in 1971.

== Renditions ==
The song has been covered, notably, by Tommy Makem, Gordon Lightfoot, Stan Rogers, The Irish Rovers, Ryan's Fancy, Harry Hibbs, Paddy Reilly, Ian and Sylvia Tyson, Anne Murray, Touchstone, Stompin' Tom Connors, The Real McKenzies, Schooner Fare, Wicked Tinkers, Battlefield Band, Alex Beaton, Aselin Debison, Dan Zanes, Moist, Oisin, Sons of Maxwell, Na h-Òganaich, Jacob Lewis and Asonance. It is an ambient theme for the Canadian civilization in the game Sid Meier's Civilization VI: Gathering Storm, and also appears in Reverse: 1999. The song is also featured in the mod Kaiserreich for Hearts of iron IV.

== Lyrics ==
Chorus:
Farewell (Note: 'Farewell', in some renditions, is sung "fare-thee-well") to Nova Scotia, the sea-bound coast, (Note: "Sea-bound coast" has also been sung as "sea-bound shore(s)" and "may your mountains" has been sung as "let your mountains".)
let your mountains dark and dreary (Note: 'dreary' is often pronounced "/drɪəraɪ/" (drear-i)) be.
for when I am far away on the briny ocean tossed,
Will you ever heave a sigh or a wish for me?

1.
The sun was setting in the west,
The birds were singing on every tree.
All nature seemed inclined to rest
But still there was no rest for me.
Chorus

2.
I grieve to leave my native land,
I grieve to leave my comrades all,
And my aging parents whom I've always loved so dear,
And the bonnie, bonnie lass (Note: 'lass' is sometimes sung "lassie" or (according to the singer's preference) "lad" or "laddie") that I do adore.
Chorus

3.
The drums they do beat and the wars do alarm, (Note: "The drums they do beat and the wars do alarm" is sometimes sung "The drums they do beat the wars' alarm" or "The drums they do beat for the wars to alarm", meaning that the drums are beating a call to arms)
The captain calls, I must obey.
Farewell, farewell to Nova Scotia's charms,
For it's early in the morning and I'm far, far away.
Chorus

4.
I have three brothers and they are at rest,
Their arms are folded on their chest.
But a poor simple sailor just like me,
Must be tossed and turned in the deep dark sea.
Chorus

== See also ==
- Canadian patriotic music
