= Alberta (anthem) =

Provincial song of Alberta, Canada

- Regional anthem of Alberta
- Lyrics: Mary Kieftenbeld
- Music: Mary Kieftenbeld
- Adopted: 2005

"Alberta" is the regional anthem of the province of Alberta, Canada. It was adopted as the official provincial song in preparation for the province's centennial celebrations in 2005.

The song was selected following a competition mandated by the Alberta Official Song Act, introduced in the Legislative Assembly of Alberta by Calgary Member of the Legislative Assembly (MLA) Wayne Cao in May 2001 and passed by the legislature in November of that year. The chosen song, selected by the 13-member Alberta Official Song Committee, was written by Mary Kieftenbeld. The song has been recorded in country and pop versions.

== Lyrics ==
Flatlands, rollin' plains
Clear blue skies, prairie rains;
A tapestry of colours in the fall.
Snow covered mountain tops,
Wheat fields, canola crops;
Alberta has it all.

Alberta is calling me.
Home sweet home, it's where I'm proud to be.
Alberta is calling me.
Livin' right I'm feelin' free.

First Nations built the land
Fur trade, way back then.
We've come a long way since that.
Agriculture, lumberjacks,
Oil derricks, natural gas;
There is no turnin' back.

Alberta is calling me.
Home sweet home, it's where I'm proud to be.
Alberta is calling me.
Livin' right I'm feelin' free.

Bridge:
Culture diverse as it can be.
This is the land of opportunity.
Welcoming friends, night and day.
That's the way I pray Alberta stays.

== See also ==
- Canadian patriotic music
