= The Island Hymn =

"The Island Hymn" is the patriotic song of the Canadian province of Prince Edward Island.

== History ==
It was first conceived early in 1908 by Professor Harry Watts of the Charlottetown School of Music who, at the suggestion of Rev. Dr. Thomas Fullerton, contacted Islander author and poet Lucy Maud Montgomery asking if she would compose the hymn's lyrics, which she wrote in 1908.

A stanza from the "Hymn" was performed for the first time in public on May 22 of that year at a combined school event marking both Arbor Day and Empire Day. Written to the metre of God Save the King, it was sung to Lawrence W. Watson's music, which had been composed especially for her lyric at the request of Professor Watts. The full piece was not performed until school closing exercises the following June 29, as Watts recalled, that the "Hymn" was first sung in its entirety.

The manuscript music, dated October 27, 1908, and correspondence relating to it are displayed at the Green Gables Heritage Place in Cavendish. An edition for mixed-voice choir composed by Christopher Gledhill was printed by Leslie Music Supply for the Prince Edward Island 1973 Centennial Committee.

"The Island Hymn" was official adopted as the provincial anthem by the Legislative Assembly of Prince Edward Island on May 7, 2010. The Provincial Anthem Act also includes a French version called "L’hymne de l’Île", which was translated by Raymond J. Arsenault of Abram-Village.

== Lyrics ==
Official English version

Fair Island of the sea,
We raise our song to thee,
The bright and blest;
Loyally now we stand
As brothers, hand in hand,
And sing God save the land
We love the best.

Upon our princely Isle
May kindest fortune smile
In coming years;
Peace and prosperity
In all her borders be,
From every evil free,
And weakling fears.

Prince Edward Isle, to thee
Our hearts shall faithful be
Where'er we dwell;
Forever may we stand
As brothers, hand in hand,
And sing God save the land
We love so well.

Official French version

Toi, bercée sur les flots,
Terre fière et champs si beaux,
Îlot béni;
Entonnons tous en chœur
Ta gloire, ton honneur,
Pour toutes les faveurs,
À l'infini.

Notr'île Saint-Jean au Cœur,
Nous gardons les valeurs
De nos aïeux:
Paix et tranquillité,
Foi et prospérité,
Unis en amitié,
Loyaux, heureux.

Notr'Île-du-Prince-Édouard,
Chantons sans fin ta gloire,
Notre patrie;
Entonnons tous en chœur
Ta gloire, ton honneur,
Pour toutes les faveurs,
À l'infini.

== See also ==
- Canadian patriotic music
