= Terry Kelly (singer) =

Canadian musical artist (born 1955)

Terry Kelly CM
- Born: Terrence Kelly; 1955 (age 70–71); St. John's, Newfoundland, Canada
- Genres: Country, folk
- Occupations: Singer-Songwriter, Motivational Speaker, Entertainer
- Instruments: Guitar, Vocals
- Years active: 1985-present
- Label: Gun Records
- Website: Official Site

Terry Kelly, CM (born 1955) is a Canadian country/folk music artist, athlete and professional speaker. Kelly has released six studio albums and charted eleven singles on the RPM Canadian country singles chart. In addition to award nominations from the Juno Awards and the Canadian Country Music Association, Kelly has also won seven East Coast Music Awards. In 2003, Kelly was inducted into the Order of Canada, the highest civilian honour within the Canadian system of honours. He sang the Canadian National Anthem at the Opening Ceremonies for the 2010 Winter Paralympics in Vancouver and also sang at the official installation ceremony of the 28th Governor General of Canada (David Lloyd Johnston) in 2010.

== Early life ==
At the age of one, Kelly was diagnosed with retinoblastoma, a cancerous condition that left him blind. As a child, he had both of his eyes removed. His parents sent him to the Halifax School for the Blind when he was seven. His recording career began in high school when he released five albums with instrumental band The Stringbusters.

International medals

Representing Canada

Canadian Track Championships
Silver medal – second place	Men's Cycling	1979
Silver medal – second place	Men's Cycling	1980

At the Canadian Track Championships, Kelly won Silver (2nd place) in 1979 and once more in 1980. He became the third blind person in the world to run a sub five-minute mile. He competed in the 1980 Paralympics in Arnhem, Netherlands and carried the Olympic torch as part of the cross Canada Torch Relay.

== Career ==
Kelly released his first studio album, On the Move, in 1985. His second album, Face to Face, was released in 1988. "In My Father's House," the first single from Kelly's third studio album, 1992's Divided Highway, was nominated for Single and SOCAN Song of the Year at the 1993 Canadian Country Music Association Awards. The same year, Kelly set an East Coast Music Awards record when he won every award that he was nominated for, including Album of the Year (Divided Highway), SOCAN Song of the Year (In My Father's House), Male Vocalist of the Year, Country Artist of the Year and Entertainer of the Year. He was also nominated for a 1995 Juno Award for Best Country Male Vocalist. A fourth album, Far Cry from Leaving, followed in 1997.

In 2000, Kelly was presented with the King Clancy Award. The following year, Kelly received an Honorary Doctorate of Civil Laws from the University of King's College. He also received an Honorary Doctorate of Fine Arts from Saint Mary's University in 2002. Kelly's 2002 album, The Power of the Dream was the first music CD in the world with Braille liner notes. In 2003, Kelly was appointed to the Order of Canada.

Kelly released his first Christmas album, Old Tyme Christmas, in 2004. In 2005, he was presented with the Humanitarian Award from the Canadian Country Music Association. Kelly travelled to Afghanistan in 2007 to perform for Canadian troops. In 2016, Kelly was inducted into the Canadian Disability Hall of Fame.

=== A Pittance of Time ===
Kelly released the single "A Pittance of Time" in 2003. Kelly was motivated to write the song by an interaction he observed at a drugstore on November 11, 1999, where Kelly felt that a father, accompanied by a young daughter, had set a bad example for her by not respecting the store's request for two minutes of silence. The song inspired a musical production, Two Minutes of Silence - A Pittance of Time.

== Discography ==
=== Albums ===
Year	Title	CAN Country
1985	On the Move	
1988	Face to Face	
1992	Divided Highway	18
1996	Far Cry from Leaving	
2002	The Power of the Dream	
2004	Old Tyme Christmas	
2013	Always There	

=== Singles ===
Year	Single	Peak positions			Album
Year	Single	CAN Country	CAN AC	CAN	Album
1985	"Driving to Mexico"	—	—	—	On the Move
1985	"Jeffrey's Song (Daddy on the Road)"	—	—	—	On the Move
1985	"The Swinger"	—	—	—	On the Move
1985	"Old Tyme Christmas Song"	—	—	—	Old Tyme Christmas
1988	"Mama Likes to Rock 'n' Roll"	—	28	90	Face to Face
1988	"Evangeline"	—	—	—	Face to Face
1988	"How Far Can a Little Girl Fall"	—	28	—	Face to Face
1988	"Inspiration"	94	—	—	Face to Face
1993	"In My Father's House"	28	—	—	Divided Highway
1993	"We Can Do Anything" (with Kelita)	27	—	—	Divided Highway
1993	"There Goes the Fire"	22	—	—	Divided Highway
1994	"River of No Return"	8	17	—	Divided Highway
1994	"The Girl Is on a Roll Tonight"	10	—	—	Divided Highway
1995	"Heart Set on You"	25	—	—	Divided Highway
1996	"Don't Take Me Home" (with Laura Smith)	38	51	—	Far Cry from Leaving
1997	"Far Cry from Leaving"	22	—	—	Far Cry from Leaving
1997	"Moment to Moment"	73	—	—	Far Cry from Leaving
1998	"Bettin' on Love"	71	—	—	Far Cry from Leaving
1999	"The Rhyme and the Reason"	42	—	—	Far Cry from Leaving
2002	"The Power of the Dream"	—	—	—	The Power of the Dream
2003	"You Can Start Again"	—	—	—	The Power of the Dream
2003	"A Pittance of Time"	—	—	—	The Power of the Dream
"—" denotes releases that did not chart
