= Thandi Klaasen =

South African musician (1931–2017)

Thandi Klaasen (born Thandiwe Nelly Mpambani, 27 September 1931 – 15 January 2017) was a jazz musician from Sophiatown, Gauteng. She was the mother of singer Lorraine Klaasen.

== Biography ==
Thandiwe Nelly Mpambani grew up in Sophiatown, the daughter of a shoemaker and a domestic worker. Her career as a singer and dancer began in the mid-1950s. She sang in various dance bands before founding the all-women group Quad Sisters. This group's 1952 song "Carolina Wam" became immensely successful. The group was an influence on later all-women ensembles, such as the Skylarks led by Miriam Makeba. Klaasen was the victim of an acid attack in 1977 that left her with facial scars, but she continued performing after her recovery. Later in her career she performed alongside her daughter Lorraine Klaasen, also a recognized singer.

Klaasen performed with Dolly Rathebe, Miriam Makeba, Dorothy Masuka, and others. She died from pancreatic cancer on 15 January 2017, aged 85, and was given a state funeral.

== Awards ==
Klaasen was awarded the Order of Ikhamanga in Gold (2006) for "excellent achievement in and contribution to the art of Music". In August 2013, as part of the Women's Month celebrations, Klaasen and four other icons of South African jazz - Abigail Kubeka, Dorothy Masuka, Sathima Bea Benjamin and Sylvia Mdunyelwa - were honoured by Standard Bank with lifetime achievement awards. Other awards she has received include the Woman of Distinction Award received in Canada (1999), and a lifetime achievement award at the 2006 South African Music Awards.
