= Lorraine Klaasen =

South African-born Canadian world music singer

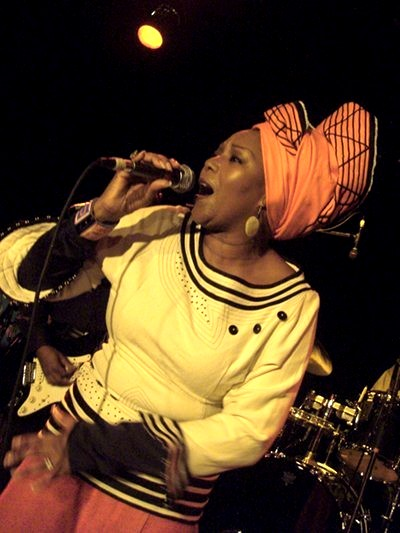
Lorraine Klaasen, Kola Note Concert 2006

Lorraine Klaasen (born 1957) is a London, Ontario-based world music singer. Her mother was South African jazz singer Thandi Klaasen. She has performed at the Montreal International Jazz Festival, and her international itinerary has included the United States, Mexico and the Caribbean. She and her mother were also reputed to be two of Nelson Mandela's favorite musicians.

In 2013, at the 42nd Annual Juno Awards, Klaasen won a Juno in the World Music Album of Year category for her latest album A Tribute to Miriam Makeba.

== Biography ==
Lorraine Klaasen was born and raised in Soweto, South Africa.

She was influenced by South Africa's musical giants of the 1950s and 1960s, such as Miriam Makeba, Dolly Rathebe, Dorothy Masuka, Sophie Mgcina and Busi Mhlongo, contemporaries and friends of her mother, Thandi Klaasen.

She launched her career at a very young age, accompanying her mother to live performances all over South Africa and neighboring states of Mozambique and Swaziland. Later she got into musical theater and toured across Europe, eventually arriving in Canada where she settled in Montreal.

Klaasen's musical repertoire has been steadily infused with a blend of Quebec, Haitian and French African influences, along with several African languages (Zulu, Sotho, Xhosa, Lingala) and her band musicians' Caribbean roots to create an eclectic sound.

As a promoter of the performing arts for Canadian youth, Klaasen has lent her support to various groups and organizations such as RapSohD Talented Teens Canada.

Lorraine won the Martin Luther King Jr. Achievement Award in 1997 for her their work and musical talent. Lorraine Klaasen was nominated and subsequently won the 2013 Juno Award for World Music Album of the Year for her album Tribute to Miriam Makeba, released in 2012.

Klaasen lives in London, Ontario, Canada, formerly living in Montreal, Quebec, Canada. She has two daughters, Jessica and Lydia.

== Discography ==
- 2000: African Connexion (Magra Multi Media KLAA-0400)
- 2008: Africa Calling
- 2012: A Tribute to Miriam Makeba
- 2016: Nouvelle Journée
- 2022: Ukubonga Gratitude (with Mongezi Ntaka)

== Videos ==
- Pata Pata (Belle et Bum), 2012
- Africa Calling (promo), 2008
