= Daniel DeShaime =

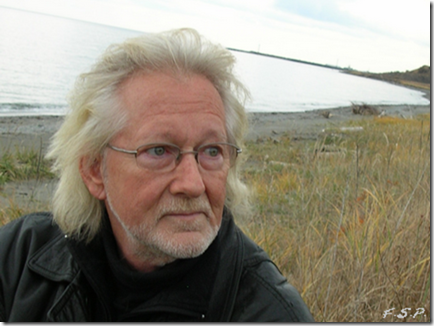
- Daniel DeShaime, Cap-Chat, 2010

Background information
- Born: Jean-Marie Deschênes; 2 August 1946 (age 80)
- Origin: Saint-Octave-de-l'Avenir, Québec, Canada
- Genre: Pop music
- Occupations: Author, composer, Singer
- Years active: 1965–present
- Labels: Trafic Music; Productions Guy Cloutier Inc.
- Website: Daniel DeShaime official site

Daniel DeShaime (born Jean-Marie Deschênes; 2 August 1946) is a Canadian French-language singer.

== Biography ==
Jean-Marie Deschênes was born on 2 August 1946 in Saint-Octave-de-l'Avenir, a village founded in 1932 near the Chic-Choc Mountains in Gaspésie and closed in 1971 by the government of Robert Bourassa. An author, composer and organist, he performed in Gaspésie, in the Magdalen Islands and in New Brunswick before playing for artists including Édith Butler, Angèle Arsenault, and Jacques Michel.

=== 1960s ===
In his childhood, Daniel DeShaime was known in his village for playing the accordion at dances and reunions. He studied classical studies at a seminary in Gaspé and the École de musique Vincent-d'Indy and at the Conservatoire de musique du Québec à Québec. Then he travelled around Gaspésie, the Magdalen Islands and New Brunswick as an organist and pianist, performing for himself and for others, singing poems for which he had composed the music, and songs by others like Claude Léveillée.

He was known in Prince Edward Island for playing the organ at the famous Père Galant lobster dinners in St-Ann's and for participating in radio and television shows on Radio-Canada, the French-language national broadcasting network. By the end of the sixties, he had accompanied artists like Danielle Oddera, Aimé Major, Raymond Breau, and Calixte Duguay, and had written and performed with Edith Butler and Angèle Arsenault, with whom he collaborated for many years.

=== 1970s ===
At the beginning of the seventies, he became the organist for the Menuet Hotel in Cap-Chat and at the Manor in Sainte-Anne-des-Monts. He also participated in a poetry tour organised by the Ministry of Cultural Affairs with Suzanne Paradis, Marie Laberge and Pierre Morency. He performed on stage as a pianist for Édith Butler and Angèle Arsenault in French-language communities across Canada, in Europe and the United States and began writing for them and for others like Denis Losier, Donat Lacroix, Calixte Duguay, Raymond Breau, Isabelle Aubret and Gérard Entremont. He was for a time the official arranger for the television show Chanson francophone on Radio-Canada in Moncton.

Following the closing of his village St-Octave-de-l'Avenir in 1971, he composed the song St-Octave-de-l'Avenir and sang it for the first time in public in 1976 at the folkloric festival organised on the site of what was once the village. This song and this moment had a prominent effect throughout his career.

=== 1980s ===
After a year as the band leader for the television show Les Coqueluches and an incursion into theater as composer and pianist for the play 18 Ans et plus written by Jean Barbeau with Dorothée Berryman, DeShaime traveled the province in 1982 as a pianist for John Littleton with George Angers and Claude Taillefer. He wrote his first album C'est drôle comme la vie in 1983 for the Trafic Music label.

He participated in the arrangement and adaptation to French of the lyrics of Daniel Lavoie for the Tension Attention album. He spent many months with Daniel Lavoie in the studio with first Jean-Jacques Bourdeau and later with John Eden, producer of the British version of Der Kommissar. His influence on the album and the use of musical instruments that were uncommon at the time, like the LinnDrum, earned him a reputation and invitations to participate in projects in England, which he declined, not wanting to be branded by a particular style.

Following the success of Tension Attention, he was solicited for many projects as an author, composer, arranger and producer. He worked with Belgazou, Louise Forestier, Marie-Claire Séguin, Michel Lalonde, Gérard Entremont, Gaston Mandeville, Marie Carmen and more. He wrote and collaborated on the movies Anne Trister (directed by Léa Pool) and Night Zoo (Un zoo la nuit) (directed by Jean-Claude Lauzon). In 1984, he and Daniel Lavoie won the Félix award for Best Song of the year for Tension Attention.

He also gave writing classes and was for many years the artistic director of the International Song Festival of Granby. In 1988, DeShaime released his second album Blanche Nuit including the track Un peu d'innocence for which he won the Félix Award for Best Songwriter/Composer of the year.

=== 1990s ===
In the nineties, DeShaime collaborated with artists like Diane Dufresne, Mitsou, Mario Pelchat and Sylvie Bernard.

His third album, Histoires d'hommes, was published in 1991 and included songs likes Je l'aime encore, chosen Song of the Year by Society of Composers, Authors and Music Publishers of Canada (SOCAN) and Et mon cœur en prend plein la gueule, later sung by Isabelle Boulay. In 1992 and 1993, he toured the province first under the Réseau des Organisateurs de Spectacles de l'Est du Québec (ROSEQ) and then as a producer himself. He composed the music and the theme song for the inauguration of the newly restored Capitole de Québec in 1992.

In 1992, he was elected vice-president of SOCAN and continued giving writing classes for SOCAN in Toronto, for the Association of authors of Canada and at The Music Industry Weekend of Saskatoon (Ateliers Fransask'Art). Around the same time, he took artistic direction of the Rencontres de la chanson de Régina and gave classes, as well as a concert at the Rencontres de la chanson au Salon de Provence in France. For his work with French-language artists from outside Québec, he was awarded the Cousins-Cousines prize for the personality from Québec who best understood the French communities of Canada.

While I was proud to receive this honor, I still wonder why there's a prize for someone who's a French-speaking personality from Québec who "understands Canadian French-speakers" even though that's what we all are, and the understanding or pleasure of working together just felt natural to me. But I have to add, that as someone from Gaspée, from St-Octave-de-l'Avenir, I felt maybe a bit more like a French-speaking outsider than a Quebecois.

— Daniel DeShaime, Hommage à Angèle Arsenault

DeShaime also gave concerts and classes and acted as the spokesperson of the Rencontres internationales de la chanson au Mont Orford and at the Festival en chansons de Petite-Vallée. In 1993, Isabelle Boulay won the Truffe d'Or and a festival in Périgueux with the song Les canards (later named Il fallait pas). They worked together to record her first album Fallait Pas, a selection of covers (Un peu d'innocence, T'es en amour, Qu'ils s'envolent, Et mon cœur en prend plein la gueule, Il fallait pas) and new songs (La Vie devant toi, J'enrage, Sur le tapis vert, Pour demain, pour hier, Un monde à refaire) all by DeShaime.

Passionate about computers, he created software to manage his royalties and was introduced by Daniel Lafrance, who became his associate, to the music publishing industry. He created Ze Publisher Inc.. By the end of 1996, he moved to France. He officially returned to Canada thirteen years later.

=== 2000s ===
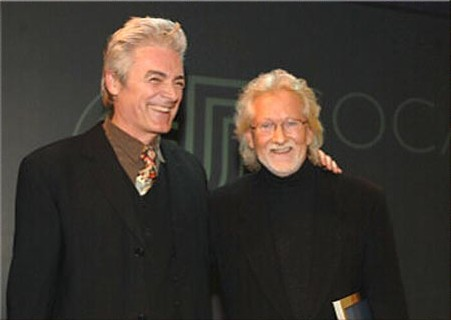
Daniel Lavoie and Daniel DeShaime, 2006

Daniel DeShaime managed his company Ze Publisher in Paris while developing tools for music publishers. He acted as a consultant for the Chambre Syndicale des Éditeurs with Société des auteurs, compositeurs et éditeurs de musique (SACEM) and in the royalty management domain for SACEM, SOCAN and other collection societies around the world.

He was recognised at the 2000 Gala of SOCAN for Un peu d'innocence and in 2006 for Fouquet's and Roule ta boule with Daniel Lavoie. In 2006, asked by the owner of the Château du Rivau, he composes variations based on an old folkloric theme from France J'ai descendu dans mon jardin. The various themes can be heard while visiting the gardens of the castle.

In 2008, while in Québec, Daniel DeShaime gave his first concert in 15 years in the church of Saint-Octave-de-l'Avenir as part of a reunion of the inhabitants of the former village. After the concert, the management and the public named the concert hall of the church after him. By the end of 2009, he came back from France for good. In 2009, he began writing in collaboration with the authors Georges Guy and Réjean Bernier a book, St-Octave-de-l'Avenir, 1932-1971..., dedicated to the memory of the inhabitants of the village that closed in 1971.

=== 2010s ===
In 2010 DeShaime gave a concert in Sainte-Anne-des-Monts and published his book St-Octave-de-l'Avenir, 1932-1971... as co-author and editor. He also announced the creation of the Fondation du Patrimoine de St-Octave-de-l'Avenir to preserve the traditional heritage of Saint-Octave-de-l'Avenir.

He organized the Chœurs de La Haute-Gaspésie Regional County Municipality a choir composed of people from the region, and with whom he worked on specific projects. In the summer of 2012, he gave a concert for the 80th anniversary of the founding of St-Octave-de-l'Avenir. Edith Butler participated as a guest.

For the festivities of the 2012 edition of the Fête des bois flottés of Sainte-Anne-des-Monts, he arranged Lisette, fais-moi un bouquet, a song from the Canadian Romancero.

In December 2012, he gave a concert in the church of Cap-Chat titled Daniel DeShaime et les Chœurs de Haute-Gaspésie chantent Noël (Daniel DeShaime and the Haute-Gaspésie choir sing Christmas) which included rearranged traditional Christmas songs and some new songs. Two years later, he reprised this concert under the name Les Noëls de mon enfance in Rimouski, Val-Brillant and Cap-Chat with voices from Haute-Gaspésie and from the Matapedia Valley. Lucie Gendron and Claud Michaud participated as special guests.

The non-profit organisation Village Grande-Nature, in charge of the territory where Saint-Octave-de-l'Avenir had been, filed for bankruptcy. With an associate, Daniel DeShaime tried to buy the village but the project did not succeed. The village was eventually sold to Gérald Pelletier.

He was invited in 2013 as a speaker to the annual Conseil de la Culture of Gaspésie and to the Salon du Livre of Sayabec.

DeShaime produced the song Le 31 de Février in 2013 from lyrics written by Sylvain Rivière and music by Lawrence Lepage, who died in December 2012. Still in 2013, Calixte Duguay, who was preparing a compilation of his songs, asked DeShaime to rearrange two of his most popular songs Pierre à Jean-Louis and Les Aboiteaux. Instead of recreating the tracks, Calixte Duguay used the ones given as is on his album (the music for Pierre à Jean-Louis, the music and the voice for Les Aboiteaux).

2014 marked the 125th birthday of the founding of the municipality of Val-Brillant in the Matapédia Valley. The organisation responsible for the festivities asked Daniel DeShaime to write a song. He wrote Une fleur dans la Vallée and the title became part of the town emblem.

In 2015, he self-produced two albums. The first one, St-Octave 2015 - Ailleurs c'est trop loin d'ici contains reprises and original songs including the title song with lyrics by Georges Guy and a rare recording of St-Octave-de-l'Avenir when it was first created in 1977. The album was presented on July 25 in Saint-Octave-de-l'Avenir where he received an hommage.

The second album 'En attendant Noël released in late December and included four original songs and three new arrangements of traditional songs.

In December 2018, Daniel DeShaime releases on the various music platforms his albums Blanche Nuit (1988) and Histoires d'Hommes (1991). The first one was unavailable to the public for almost 25 years, the second one nearly 20 years.

In July 2019 after some restoration, he published his first album C'est drôle comme la vie (1983) on the music platforms 38 years after its first release. This album was released in a very limited number in 1983. It contains a few of the original songs reprised by Isabelle Boulay in 1996. (Et mon coeur en prend plein la gueule and T'es en amour)

== Discography ==
=== Studio albums ===
- En Gaspésie (45 Tours) (1977)
- Prends ton élan (Jeux du Québec Région Est – 45 Tours) (1980)
- C'est drôle comme la vie (1983)
- Blanche Nuit (1988)
- Histoires D'Hommes (1991)
- J'ai descendu dans mon jardin (2007)
- St-Octave 2015 - Ailleurs c'est trop loin d'ici (2015)
- En attendant Noël (2015)

=== Songs written/produced and albums produced for other artists ===
- 1973 : Édith Butler – Avant d'être dépaysée (Au bout des chansons, Avant d'être dépaysée, Et puis je t'aime, Les Berceaux, Nos hommes ont mis la voile, Sail à majeur)
- 1974 : Édith Butler – L'Acadie s'marie (L'Acadie s'marie, Mais je m'en vais demain, Mon ami, Rêve, Tous nos hommes, Tu n'as pas besoin)
- 1976 : Édith Butler – Je vous aime, ma vie recommence (Comme des juifs errants, Dans l'île, Je m'avance au devant de toi, Tu regardes la mer)
- 1977 : Denise Guénette – Chu née ici pis j'reste ici (La vie des fois)
- 1977 : Jacques Michel – Le Temps d'Aimer (Le Temps d'Aimer)
- 1978 : Édith Butler – L'espoir (J'étions fille du vent et d'Acadie)
- 1978 : Denis Losier – Dans Un Coin d'Escalier (Communiquer)
- 1978 : Jacques Michel – Le Cœur Plus Chaud (Cumulus, J'ai le cœur plus chaud, Le temps du Charleston, Papa)
- 1978 : Julie Arel – Avec Toi Mon Amour (Avec toi mon amour, Mon soleil à moi, Nous ton père et moi, Qui a peur du mal d'amour, Si toi tu m'aimes, Ton amour fou)
- 1979 : Édith Butler – Asteur Qu'On est Là (L'Arcadie qu'est-ce que c'est)
- 1980 : Ginette Ravel – La Vérité (La plupart du temps)
- 1982 : Belgazou – Belgazou (Climatisé)
- 1983 : Daniel Lavoie – Tension Attention (Fouquet's, Hôtel des rêves, Ils s'aiment, Le métro n'attend pas, Photo Mystère, Qui va là, Ravi de te revoir, Roule ta boule, Tension Attention)
- 1984 : Belgazou – Fly (Accélérateur, Can't Imagine, Je suis d'ailleurs, La vie faut que ça sonne, Petite fille)
- 1987 : Louise Forestier – La Passion Selon Louise (Clichés, Il m'appelle je t'aime, Il pleut, La mer des tendresses, Métropolis, Valise oubliée)
- 1987 : Marie-Claire Séguin – MINUIT 1/4 (Avec Chopin)
- 1988 : Michel Lalonde – Délit de Suite (Arrêt Stop, Le clochard)
- 1989 : Marie Carmen – Dans La Peau (Faut pas que j'panique)
- 1989 : Gérard Entremont – Détournement de Rêveur (Ailleurs c'est pas mieux, La dame du Delta, Quelque chose comme du bonheur)
- 1989 : Gaston Mandeville – Où Sont Passé les Vrais Rebelles (16 ans, Bizness Blues, Gens stupides vs Amour, L'homme de la maison, le rêve américain, Mama, Où sont passés les vrais rebels, Pluie d'été, Ran dam dans le trafic)
- 1990 : Sylvie Bernard – Marcher Sur Du Verre (Qu'ils s'envolent)
- 1990 : Nathalie Simard – Au Maximum (Pas touche à mon cœur)
- 1990 : Mitsou – Terre Des Hommes (Lettre à un cowboy)
- 1991 : Danielle Oddera – Passion Tendresse (Photos de voyage)
- 1991 : Joe Bocan – Les Désordres (Comme une enfant, Déserteur)
- 1993 : Diane Dufresne – Détournement majeur (J'écris c'qui m'chante)
- 1996 : Isabelle Boulay – Fallait Pas (Et mon cœur en prend plein la gueule, Il fallait pas, J'enrage, La vie devant toi, Pour demain pour hier, Qu'ils s'envolent, Sur le tapis vert, T'es en amour, Tu n'as pas besoin, Un monde à refaire, Un peu d'innocence)
- 2014 : Calixte Duguay – Orchidée d'Acadie (Pierre à Jean-Louis – Arrangement, Les Aboiteaux – Arrangement et interpretation)

== Filmography ==
- 1986 : Anne Trister – Léa Pool (Composer)
- 1987 : Night Zoo (Un zoo la nuit) – Jean-Claude Lauzon (Lost in a hurricane – Composer)

== Musical Theater ==
- 2002: Un Rendez-vous dans l'irréel (Le monde meilleur, Prisons Dorées, Cinéma Clip – Author)

== Theater ==
- 1967 : Composer for Pygmalion, directed by Paul Hébert at the Théâtre du Trident in Québec
- 1981 : Composer for the play " Dix-huit ans et plus " (Jean Barbeau) with Dorothée Berryman)

== Television ==
- 1981 : Band leader for the television show " Les Coqueluches " (Radio-Canada)
- 1988 : Laser 33–45 presented by René Simard (Opening song : Musique Magique)

== Books ==
- 2010 : St-Octave-de-l'Avenir, 1932–1971... (Co-author and publisher)
- 2012 : Vive la Haute-Gaspésie libre – Georges Guy (Preface)

== Awards ==
- 1984 : Félix award for Song of the year – Tention Attention
- 1987 : Prix Génie Meilleure chanson originale – Lost in a hurricane (Night Zoo (Un zoo la nuit) avec Jean-Pierre Bonin, Jean Corriveau et Robert Stanley)
- 1988 : Félix award for Author-Composer of the year – Un peu d'innocence
- 1993 : Socan Award – Most played song on radio – Je l'aime encore
- 1996 : Socan Classics – Ils s'aiment
- 1996 : Socan Classics – Tension Attention
- 1998 : Socan Award – Most played song on radio – Et mon cœur en prend plein la gueule
- 2000 : Socan Classics – Un peu d'innocence
- 2006 : Socan Classics – Fouquet's
- 2006 : Socan Classics – Roule ta boule
- 2008 : Daniel DeShaime Concert hall – Saint-Octave-de-l'Avenir Church
- Award Cousins-Cousines for the personality from Quebec who best understood the French communities of Canada
