= Lawrence Lepage =

Canadian singer-songwriter

- Born: September 3, 1932; Nazareth (Modern day Rimouski), Quebec, Canada
- Died: December 24, 2012 (aged 80); Rimouski, Quebec, Canada
- Occupation: Singer-songwriter
- Notable work: Mon vieux François; Monsieur Marcoux

Lawrence Lepage (3 September 1932 – 24 December 2012) was a Québécois singer-songwriter.

== Biography ==
Lawrence Lepage was born on 3 September 1932 in Nazareth (modern-day Rimouski), Quebec, Canada.

Lawrence Lepage started his career in 1959 as a guitarist for Jacques Labrecque. He performed in fringe venues; first at Le Cochon Borgne, la Butte à Mathieu, then at Chez Dieu, le Casanou and L'Imprévu.

He wrote songs for Pauline Julien, Louise Forestier, Jacques Labrecque, Georges Dor, Édith Butler, Angèle Arsenault, Buffy Ste-Marie and Alexandre Zelkine. He worked with Gilles Vigneault, Tex Lecor, Guy Godin, Suzanne Valéry, Pierre Morency and Jean-Claude Germain. His two most well-known songs are Monsieur Marcoux and Mon vieux François.

In the late 1970s, Lepage returned to his home region, Rimouski. He lived out of public view, in the woods.

In 1991, a collection of poems and songs of Lepage called Entre la parole et les mots was published.

In 2000, Sylvain Rivière published Chapeau dur et coeur de pomme/ Lawrence Lepage, a semi-biographic telling of Lepage's life.

Lepage came back on scene and on disc in autumn 2012 with his album Le temps. He died soon after on 24 December 2012, at his home, near Rimouski.

== Discography ==
Albums
Year	Title
1966	Lawrence Lepage
1976	Enfin Lawrence Lepage
2012	Le temps

Simples
Year	Title
1971	Rodéo Cadieux/La gibelote
1975	Jean du Lac/Jean Roméo
