= Ses plus belles histoires =

Compilation album by Isabelle Boulay
- Released: September 17, 2002
- Label: Sidéral

Isabelle Boulay chronology
Mieux qu'ici-bas (2000)	Ses plus belles histoires (2002)	Au moment d'être à vous (2002)

Ses plus belles histoires is a compilation album of francophone Canadian pop singer Isabelle Boulay. It includes three covers ("Les ailes des hirondelles", "Perce les nuages", and "Vole colombe") and one new song ("Sans toi"), and was released in September 2002.

== Track listing ==
1. "La lune" (Lyrics: Christian Mistral, music: Mario Peluso)— 3:49
2. "J'ai mal à l'amour" (Mario Peluso) — 3:15
3. "Le saule" (Lyrics: Francis Basset, music: Franck Langolff) — 5:04
4. "Les ailes des hirondelles" (Zachary Richard) — 4:35
5. "Les yeux au ciel" (Lyrics: Damien Ruzé, music: Jacques Romenski) — 4:26
6. "Et mon coeur en prend plein la gueule" (Daniel DeShaime) — 4:31
7. "Le banc des délaissés" (Zachary Richard) — 4:57
8. "Je t'oublierai, je t'oublierai" (Lyrics: Luc Plamondon, music: Richard Cocciante) — 3:30
9. "Parle-moi" (J. Kapler) — 3:31
10. "Sans toi" (Frédéric Kocourek, J. Kapler)— 3:52
11. "J'enrage" (Daniel Deshaime) — 4:39
12. "Perce les nuages" — 3:32
13. "Tombée de toi" (with France D'Amour; written by France D'Amour, Roger Tabra) — 3:03
14. "Un jour ou l'autre" (Patrick Bruel, Marie-Florence Gros) — 3:52
15. "Jamais assez loin" (Zachary Richard, Louise Forestier)— 3:50
16. "Vole colombe" — 3:58

== Charts ==
Chart	Peak position
Canadian Albums Chart	10

=== Year-end charts ===
2002 year-end chart performance for Ses plus belles histoires
Chart (2002)	Position
Canadian Albums (Nielsen SoundScan)	120
