= Christine Charbonneau =

French Canadian singer and songwriter

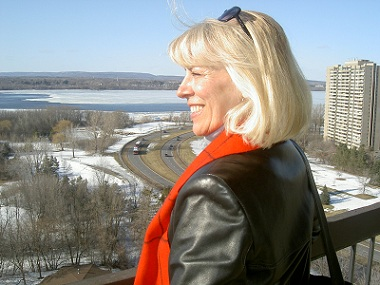
- Charbonneau in 2008

Background information
- Born: Christine Charbonneau; 18 October 1943; Montreal, Quebec
- Died: 29 May 2014 (aged 70)
- Genres: Pop, French songs
- Occupations: Singer, songwriter, composer, poet, author
- Instruments: Guitar, piano, vocals
- Years active: 1963–2005
- Labels: Mérite, Polydor (labeled as Polydor/Pléiade), Gamma, Triomphe, Select

Christine Charbonneau (18 October 1943 – 29 May 2014) was a French Canadian singer and songwriter.

== Most popular songs ==
Du fil des aiguilles et du coton recorded by France Castel in 1972 and sung by Céline Dion in 1973, on her first public appearance at the age of five, at the wedding of her brother Michel. Tout va trop vite recorded by Patsy Gallant in 1972. Les femmes (Qu'y a-t-il dans le coeur des femmes) recorded by Patsy Gallant in 1974 and covered by Sheila in France in 1976. Donne l'amour recorded by Ginette Reno in 1974. Censuré recorded by Christine Charbonneau in 1975. Cécile Tremblay-Matte, musicologist, recognizes Christine Charbonneau in her book La chanson écrite au féminin, as the French Canadian female songwriter who had the most songs recorded by different artists in Québec during the period of 1960 to 1980.

== Early career ==
Born in Montreal, Quebec in 1943, Charbonneau wrote her first song at the age of twelve. She began singing professionally at La Butte à Mathieu in Val-David, Québec in 1959. She accompanied herself with a guitar like her mentor Felix Leclerc and was considered to be one of the icons of Québec song. Charbonneau was referred to as a chansonnier. She toured for several years in the Québec coffee houses called les boîtes à chansons, which were proliferating at the time.

Charbonneau started giving songs to different singers, such as Ginette Ravel, one of the major artists of this epoch. She recorded Charbonneau's song L'amour, on her album "L'amour c'est comme un jour," released in 1963 on RCA Victor Records. Her song Je te chercherai was recorded by Renée Claude on (Renée Claude Volume 2), Select Records. Charbonneau made her first album with Sélect Records in 1963 : The title was "Les insolences d'une jeune femme".

On 24 June 1965, Charbonneau was invited to participate at the Saint-John-Baptiste Celebration Day, (today the National Holiday) in Québec. That year it was held exceptionally at Jarry Park in the north of Montréal. Surrounded by other artists, Charbonneau performed in front of more than forty thousand people.

Around 1967, as the boites à chansons were facing decline, Charbonneau continued her career at CBC Radio and CBC Television. She was invited several times on the Coast to Coast CBC Television series Chansons (TV series) produced by Anton Van de Water, where she was singing in company of many other artists including Joni Mitchell Jacques Blanchet, Margo McKinnon, Pauline Julien and Gordon Lightfoot, the Travelers. In 1968, she made a third album entitled Christine with Gamma Records, and François Dompierre was her orchestra director. Later he composed a few songs for her.

In 1968, Charbonneau had her first Télévision Summer Series at CBC SRC and co-hosted with Jacques Blanchet the musical show "Tête heureuse". In 1969, she co-hosted with Blanchet a chanson radio show at CBC Radio : "Tour à tour". In August 1969, Charbonneau represented Canada at the Spa Festival in Belgium but lost the contest.

=== Composing for others ===
The 1970s are the most intensive years of her songwriter career, being marked by the recording of many of her songs with different artists. Du fil des aiguilles et du coton, Je le vois dans ma soupe, Ça m'fait du bien recorded by France Castel on Profil Records and Trans-World Records, reached the Top Twenty Charts in Quebec and her 1973, 1974, 1975 albums are mostly Charbonneau's songs. Patsy Gallant made the charts with Tout va trop vite, Thank you come again (in French), Un jour comme les autres, Le lit qui craque, songs that gave a start to Gallant's French-language career in Quebec. In 1974 Charbonneau gave to Patsy Gallant her original song Les femmes (Qu'y a-t-il dans le cœur des femmes) which was recorded on her 1974 album "Toi l'enfant," released by Columbia Records. Les femmes was covered by the popular French singer Sheila, who released the single Les femmes in 1976 with Carrere Records and topped the French Top Twenty. It could be found also on the album L'amour qui brûle en moi.

In 1974, Charbonneau wrote a first song for Ginette Reno, Donne l'amour, which was recorded on her album "Aimons-nous". Also in 1979, Reno recorded Oublie-moi on her album "Je ne suis qu'une chanson," produced by Melon-Miel Records, In 1980, she received 3 awards (Félix), including the bestseller album of the year (350,000 copies), and in a few months sold 350,000 albums.

Michel Louvain and Claude Valade were back on the Quebec charts with songs written by Charbonneau. La dame en bleu on Mirabel Records was for Louvain one of the greatest hits of his career. Viens t'étendre aux creux de mes bras, Aide-moi à passer la nuit, J'ai dit non, Quand tes yeux, C'est parce que je t'aime , Est-ce si facile , Le chemin de tes rêves – all songs who have featured in the Top Ten on the Quebec charts and were among Claude Valade's hits that became standards on Quebec radio airplay. Charbonneau's biggest hit as a singer was her disco song of 1975, Censuré.

In 2008, the song Les femmes sung by Sheila was one of the chosen song for the musical background of the film Stella, by Sylvie Verheyder.

Charbonneau died of cancer on 29 May 2014.
