= Jacqueline Lemay =

Canadian singer-songwriter and guitarist (1937–2026)

- Born: Jacqueline Marie Adée Lemay; May 23, 1937; Guérin, Témiscamingue, Quebec, Canada
- Died: March 9, 2026 (aged 88)
- Occupations: Singer-songwriter; Guitarist

Jacqueline Marie Adée Lemay (May 23, 1937 – March 9, 2026) was a Canadian singer-songwriter and guitarist. She composed more than 300 songs and released numerous albums. Lemay taught and performed popular songs in English in the cabarets of Rouyn-Noranda and was a member of the Missionary Oblates of Mary Immaculate in Canada from 1957 to 1963. She, Lise Aubut, songwriter Angèle Arsenault and Édith Butler the founded small Société de production et de programmation de spectacles record-producing company in 1970.

== Early life ==
Lemay was born on May 23, 1937, in Guérin, Témiscamingue, Quebec. She had ten siblings, one of whom, Jérôme Lemay, was a musician in the band Les Jérolas. In 1954, Lemay earned her supplementary teaching certificate from the École normale Ville-Marie, Témiscamingue and got a advanced teaching certificate from the École normale de Sherbrooke in 1958.

== Career ==
Following graduation, when she was 17, Lemay was teaching and performed popular songs in English in the cabarets of Rouyn-Noranda. From 1957 to 1963, she was a member of the religious community in Cap-de-la-Madeleine, Quebec, the Missionary Oblates of Mary Immaculate in Canada known as "The Sisters in Nylon Stockings", after being talked out of going to Montreal by her brother. While teaching grades six and seven at the St. Charles-Garnier School, Sherbrooke and acting as principal of the elementary school, Lemay started writing songs that were mainly religious in inspiration and performing them to her own guitar accompaniment. She did not write down her songs; as soon as she completed a song, so as not to lose it, she recorded it on a cassette tape, saying it would take more time for her to write a song than record it. Lemay authored some songs in English with the aid of a collaborator.

She released her first 45 rpm record album in March 1959. which contained four songs with guitar accompaniment. Lemay recorded the singles Vive la vie,' 'Route claire,' and 'Merci' and then studied voice with Patricia Poitras from 1961 to 1962 and guitar with Johan Van Veen in 1963 in Quebec City. Her second record, Compagnon, was recorded at RCA Victor Studios released in March 1962 and included the songs that were inspired by both religious and secular themes "Paix du soir", "Je T’appartiens", "Si tu vois la mer", "Cpagnon", “Le Soleil reviendra", and “Monsieur le Bonheur". Lemay toured in Quebec as well as the United States and also performed on radio and television. She left the Oblates in 1963 and released the LP Un Long Voyage in 1967. In 1969, on a grant from the Ministry of Culture and Communications (MACQ), Lemay travelled to Paris to work with Annie Charlot and Jean Lumière. She authored and performed songs of a French version of George Ryga's play The Ecstasy of Rita Joe, presented at the La Comédie-Canadienne in 1969.

In 1970, Lemay co-established with Lise Aubut, songwriter Angèle Arsenault and Édith Butler the small Société de production et de programmation de spectacles record-producing company. In late 1974, she was contacted by a friend in New York who enquired if she could compose a new work for International Women's Year by the United Nations in 1975. The song, which Lemay composed in both English and French, was called "La Moitié du monde est une femme"; the song was performed by Pauline Julien in Quebec and Isabelle Aubret in French-speaking Europe. She used the song's title for an anthology of poems and songs released in 1976. In 1978, Lemay toured multiple schools in Ontario and Quebec, recording an album of children's songs. Lemay advised the MACQ between 1980 and 1982 and hosted a CBC Radio program on song in 1983. She worked for the Société professionnelle des auteurs et des compositeurs du Québec. Lemay recorded the CD album Présences in 1990, and a collection of mood music on cassette in 1991. In 1991, she founded the PERC (Projets Éducatifs Route Claire – Route Claire Educational Projects) and released the complication album Les 27 chansons (The 27 Songs) with Arsenault and Butler in 1996 following an approach by the Centre de pédagogie dynamique de Sherbrooke.

Lemay was the composer of more than 300 songs and several of them were published by the Éditions de l'Échelle. She composed "Je voudrais être", "Qui je suis" and "Le Fil de la rivière" for Butler, and "Aut' fidélité", "Le Québécois" and "Les Jeans" among others and several of her songs were complied into the three-cassette album Des succès inoubliables in 1989.

== Death ==
She died on March 9, 2026 and a religious ceremony for her took place on April 11 at the Centre funéraire Côte-des-Neiges, Montreal.
