= List of number-one albums of 2008 (Canada) =

These are the Canadian number-one albums of 2008. The chart is compiled by Nielsen Soundscan and published by Jam! Canoe, issued every Sunday. The chart also appears in Billboard magazine as Top Canadian Albums.

Key
†	Indicates best-performing album of 2008

Issue date	Album	Artist
January 5	Noël	Josh Groban
January 12	Taking Chances †	Celine Dion
January 19	In Rainbows	Radiohead
January 26	In Rainbows	Radiohead
February 2	In Rainbows	Radiohead
February 9	Juno	Soundtrack
February 16	Fortress	Protest the Hero
February 23	Sleep Through the Static	Jack Johnson
March 1	Sleep Through the Static	Jack Johnson
March 8	Sleep Through the Static	Jack Johnson
March 15	Nos Lendemains	Isabelle Boulay
March 22	Sleep Through the Static	Jack Johnson
March 29	Sleep Through the Static	Jack Johnson
April 5	11	Bryan Adams
April 12	Sleep Through the Static	Jack Johnson
April 19	Accelerate	R.E.M.
April 26	Spirit	Leona Lewis
May 3	E=MC²	Mariah Carey
May 10	Ma Peau	Éric Lapointe
May 17	Hard Candy	Madonna
May 24	Hard Candy	Madonna
May 31	Narrow Stairs	Death Cab for Cutie
June 7	Love at the End of the World	Sam Roberts
June 14	Here I Stand	Usher
June 21	Indestructible	Disturbed
June 28	Tha Carter III	Lil Wayne
July 5	Viva la Vida or Death and All His Friends	Coldplay
July 12	Viva la Vida or Death and All His Friends	Coldplay
July 19	Viva la Vida or Death and All His Friends	Coldplay
July 26	Viva la Vida or Death and All His Friends	Coldplay
August 2	Viva la Vida or Death and All His Friends	Coldplay
August 9	Breakout	Miley Cyrus
August 16	Breakout	Miley Cyrus
August 23	Mamma Mia!	Soundtrack
August 30	A Little Bit Longer	Jonas Brothers
September 6	A Little Bit Longer	Jonas Brothers
September 13	All Hope Is Gone	Slipknot
September 20	The Block	New Kids on the Block
September 27	Death Magnetic	Metallica
October 4	Death Magnetic	Metallica
October 11	Death Magnetic	Metallica
October 18	Death Magnetic	Metallica
October 25	Appeal to Reason	Rise Against
November 1	Death Magnetic	Metallica
November 8	Black Ice	AC/DC
November 15	Black Ice	AC/DC
November 22	Black Ice	AC/DC
November 29	Fearless	Taylor Swift
December 6	Dark Horse	Nickelback
December 13	Chinese Democracy	Guns N' Roses
December 20	Circus	Britney Spears
December 27	Dark Horse	Nickelback

== See also ==
- List of Hot 100 number-one singles of 2008 (Canada)
