= Fallait pas =

Studio album by Isabelle Boulay
- Released: 1996
- Genre: Pop
- Label: Tréma/Sidéral
- Producer: Daniel Deshaime

Isabelle Boulay chronology
Fallait pas (1996)	États d'amour (1998)

Fallait pas is francophone Canadian pop singer Isabelle Boulay's first studio album. It was released in 1996. Words and music for the songs on the album were written by Daniel DeShaime. The first track on the album, "Un peu d'innocence", reached position #41 on the Flanders charts in 1996.

== Track listing ==
1. "Un peu d'innocence" — 4:49
2. "T'es en amour" — 3:42
3. "La Vie devant toi" — 4:26
4. "Qu'ils s'envolent" — 4:01
5. "Et mon cœur en prend plein la gueule" — 3:59
6. "J'enrage" — 4:40
7. "Sur le tapis vert" — 3:44
8. "Pour demain, pour hier" — 4:42
9. "Un monde à refaire" — 3:49
10. "Il fallait pas" — 3:16
11. "Tu n'as pas besoin" — 3:47
