= Au moment d'être à vous =

Live album by Isabelle Boulay
- Released: September 2002
- Genre: Pop
- Label: V2/Sidéral

Isabelle Boulay chronology
Ses plus belles histoires (2002)	Au moment d'être à vous (2002)	Tout un jour (2004)

Au moment d'être à vous is francophone Canadian pop singer Isabelle Boulay's second live album, released in September 2002. It achieved a great success in Belgium (Wallonia), France and Switzerland, where it reached the top ten. It also stayed for 57 weeks on the French Albums Chart and was certified Platinum by the SNEP.

This album is composed of Boulay's songs from her previous studio albums, plus cover versions of songs by various French artists. It is a live album recorded March 30–31, 2002 at the Palais des Congrès, Paris and April 4–5, 2002 at the Salle Wilfrid-Pelletier, Place des Arts, Montreal, where she was accompanied by the Montreal Symphony Orchestra.

There are two substantially different releases of this album; one, the French version, has 17 tracks, and was released in 2002; the second, Canadian, version has 13 tracks, and was released in 2003.

== Track listing (French version) ==
1. "Au moment d'être à vous" (Didier Golemanas, Daniel Seff) – 4:37
2. "Avec le temps" (Léo Ferré) – 5:17
3. "Monopolis" (Michel Berger, Luc Plamondon) – 4:30
4. "Ma Fille" (Raymond Bernard, Eddy Marnay) – 4:36
5. "Mieux qu'ici-bas" (Golemanas, Seff) – 4:13
6. "Perce les nuages" (Paul Daraiche) - 4:13
7. "Répondez-Moi" (Francis Cabrel)
8. "C'était l'hiver" (Francis Cabrel) – 4:02
9. "Je t'oublierai, je t'oublierai" (Riccardo Cocciante, Luc Plamondon) - 3:45
10. "Parle-moi" (J. Kapler) - 3:51
11. "Quelques Pleurs" (J. Kapler) - 3:52
12. "Un Jour ou l'autre"
13. "Non, je ne regrette rien" (Charles Dumont, Michel Vaucaire) – 3:25
14. "La Mamma" (Charles Aznavour, Robert Gall) – 5:37
15. "Et maintenant" (Gilbert Bécaud, Pierre Delanoë) – 4:24
16. "Amsterdam" (a capella)
17. "Sans toi" (bonus track)

== Track listing (Canadian version) ==
1. "Au moment d'être à vous" – 4:37
2. "Le retour de Don Quichotte" – 5:48
3. "Avec le temps" – 5:17
4. "Pour un ami condamné" – 4:23
5. "Monopolis" – 4:30
6. "Brésil/Amor, Amor/Symphonie" – 4:37
7. "Ma fille" – 4:36
8. "Mieux qu'ici bas" – 4:13
9. "C'était l'hiver" – 4:02
10. "Non, je ne regrette rien" – 3:25
11. "La Mamma" – 5:37
12. "Et maintenant" – 4:24
13. "Nos rivières" – 5:55

== Personnel ==
- Eric Arbour – engineer
- Karen Baskin – cello
- Theodore Baskin – oboe
- Jocelyne Bastien – alto sax
- Jacques Beaudoin – contrabass
- Pierre Beaudry – trombone
- Marc Béliveau – violone
- Denis Bluteau – flute
- Chantale Boivin – alto sax
- Jean Sébastien Boucher – recording assistant
- James Box – trombone
- Li Ke Chang – cello
- Eric Chappell – contrabass
- Marieandre Chevrette – violone
- Carolyn Christie – flute
- Janet Creaser – keyboard
- Jonathan Crow – violone
- Robert Crowley – clarinet
- Denys Derome – assistant, horn
- Alain Desgagné – clarinet
- Serge Desgagnés – percussion
- Russell Devuyst – trumpet
- Bruce Dixon – bass
- Pierre Djokic – cello
- Marie Doré – violone
- Marianne Dugal – violone
- Sophie Dugas – violone
- Victor Eichenwald – violone
- Nicolò Eugelmi – alto sax
- Scott Feltheim – contrabass
- Jean-Pierre Fortin – alto sax
- Xiao Hong Fu – violone
- Mary Ann Fujino – violone
- Jean Luc Ganon – trumpet
- Claude Gassian – photography
- Jean Gaudreault – horn
- Luis Grinhauz – violone
- Neal Gripp – alto sax
- Olga Gross – clavier
- Mathieu Harel – bassoon
- Joan Herschorn – contrabass
- Timothy Hutchins – flute
- Sylvie Lambert – cello
- Jason Lang – acoustic guitar
- Reynald LArchevêque – violone
- Jacques Lavallée – percussion, timbales
- Daniel Lavoie – production assistant
- Simon Leclerc – arranger, orchestration, musical direction
- Vivian Lee – trombone
- Isabelle Lessard – violone
- Steve Levesque – bassoon
- Caroline Lizotte – harp
- Andrei Malashenko – timbales
- David Marlowe – horn
- John Milner – horn
- Andre Moisan – clarinet, saxophone
- Katherine Palyga – violone
- Peter Parthun – cello
- Myriam Pellerin – violone
- Christian Péloquin – acoustic guitar
- Monique Poitras – violone
- Véronique Potvin – alto sax
- David Quinn – sax
- Natalie Racine – sax
- François Rainville – engineer
- Brian Robinson – contrabass
- Andre Roy – alto sax
- Michael Roy – percussion
- Gary Russell – cello
- Denis Savage – engineer, mixing
- Claire Segal – violone
- Rosemary Shaw – sax
- Virginia Spicer – piccolo
- Ben Stolow – sax
- Eva Svensson – violone
- Pierre Tessier – cello
- Steven VanGulik – trumpet
- Edouard Wingell – contrabass
- Daniel Yakymyshyn – violone
- Alexa Zirbel – oboe
- John Zirbel – horn

== Certifications ==
Country	Certification	Date	Sales certified	Physical sales
France	Platinum	2002	300,000	290,000 in 2002 + 139,000 in 2003

== Charts ==
Chart (2000–2002)	Peak position
Belgian (Wallonia) Albums Chart	5
French Albums Chart	4
Swiss Albums Chart	8

End of the year chart (2002)	Position
Belgian (Wallonia) Albums Chart	37
French Albums Chart	29
End of the year chart (2003)	Position
French Albums Chart	74
