= Tout un jour =

Studio album by Isabelle Boulay
- Released: May 2004
- Genre: Pop
- Label: V2/Sidéral

Isabelle Boulay chronology
Au moment d'être à vous (2002)	Tout un jour (2004)	Du Temps pour toi (2005)

Singles from Tout un jour
- 1. "Tout au bout de nos peines" Released: December 2004

Tout un jour is francophone Canadian pop singer Isabelle Boulay's fourth studio album, released in May 2004. It contains a duet with Johnny Hallyday, "Tout au bout de nos peines," which was a top ten hit in France and Belgium. The album was in these countries very successful, making the top five and remaining on the French charts for almost two years.

== Track listing ==
1. "C'est quoi, c'est l'habitude" — 4:11
2. "Une autre vie" — 3:56
3. "Ici" — 3:35
4. "Aimons-nous" — 3:38
5. "Celui qui dort avec moi" — 3:46
6. "Un chanteur sans mélodie" — 3:43
7. "En t'attendant" — 4:22
8. "Tout un jour" — 3:45
9. "J'irai jusqu'au bout" — 4:21
10. "Jamais" — 4:35
11. "Tout au bout de nos peines" duet with Johnny Hallyday — 3:34
12. "Je sais ton nom" — 5:58
13. "Telle que je suis" — 4:03
14. "Je voudrais" — 2:21

== Certifications ==
Country	Certification	Date	Sales certified	Physical sales
Canada	Gold	May 18, 2004	50,000	
France	Gold	2004	200,000	194,000 in 2004 + 45,913 in 2005

== Charts ==
Chart (2004–2006)	Peak position
Belgian (Wallonia) Albums Chart	3
French Albums Chart	4
Swiss Albums Chart	11
World Albums Chart	38

End of the year chart (2004)	Position
Belgian (Wallonia) Albums Chart	21
French Albums Chart	43
End of the year chart (2005)	Position
French Albums Chart	174
