= Mieux qu'ici-bas =

Studio album by Isabelle Boulay
- Released: September 2000
- Genre: Pop
- Label: V2/Sidéral

Isabelle Boulay chronology
Scènes d'amour (2000)	Mieux qu'ici-bas (2000)	Ses plus belles histoires (2002)

Singles from Mieux qu'ici-bas
- 1. "Parle-moi" Released: October 2000; 2. "Un Jour ou l'autre" Released: February 2001

Mieux qu'ici-bas is francophone Canadian pop singer Isabelle Boulay's third studio album, released in September 2000. It was led by the hit single "Parle-moi" which was released about the same time. The album achieved great success in Belgium (Wallonia) and France, where it reached the top ten and stayed on the chart for about two years.

== Track listing ==
1. "Parle-moi" (J. Kapler) — 3:46
2. "Jeu tentant" (Jean Fauque) — 3:46
3. "Un jour ou l'autre" (Patrick Bruel, Marie-Florence Gros) — 3:49
4. "Jamais assez loin" (Zachary Richard, Louise Forestier) — 3:49
5. "Trop de choses" (Jean Fauque) — 4:05
6. "Cœur combat" (Didier Golemanas, Daniël Seff) — 4:11
7. "Mieux qu'ici-bas" (Didier Golemanas, Daniël Seff) — 4:08
8. "Je m'en contenterai" (Serge Lama) — 3:40
9. "Quand vos cœurs m'appellent" (J. Kapler) — 3:40
10. "Je n'voudrais pas t'aimer" (Zachary Richard) — 4:12
11. "C'était notre histoire" (Élisabeth Anaïs) — 3:54
12. "Quelques pleurs" (J. Kapler) — 4:52
13. "Où tu t'en vas?" (Patrick Bruel, Marie-Florence Gros) — 4:20
14. "Nos rivières" (Didier Golemanas, Daniël Seff) — 4:35

== Charts ==
Chart	Peak position
Belgian (Wallonia) Albums Chart	4
Canadian Albums Chart	4
French Albums Chart	6
Swiss Albums Chart	65

End of the year chart (2000)	Position
Belgian (Wallonia) Albums Chart	73
Canadian Albums (Nielsen SoundScan)	103
French Albums Chart	30
End of the year chart (2001)	Position
Belgian (Wallonia) Albums Chart	7
Canadian Albums (Nielsen SoundScan)	68
French Albums Chart	17
End of the year chart (2002)	Position
French Albums Chart	40

== Certifications ==
Country	Certification	Date	Sales certified	Physical sales
France	Diamond	November 16, 2002	1,000,000	250,000 in 2000 + 375,000 in 2001 + 231,000 in 2002
