= Christian Mistral =

Canadian poet and writer (1964–2020)

- Born: Paul-André Boucher; November 3, 1964; Montreal, Quebec, Canada
- Died: November 23, 2020 (aged 56)
- Occupations: novelist, poet, songwriter
- Writing career
- Period: 1980s-present
- Notable work: Vamp
- Website: Official website

Christian Mistral (3 November 1964 – 23 November 2020) was a Canadian novelist, poet, and songwriter from Quebec.

== Career ==
He was most noted for his debut novel Vamp, which was a shortlisted nominee for the Governor General's Award for French-language fiction at the 1988 Governor General's Awards.

His most famous work as a songwriter, "La lune", was recorded by pop singer Isabelle Boulay for her 1998 album États d'amour. He has also written songs for Dan Bigras and Luce Dufault, as well as "Un Bateau dans une bouteille", the theme song for Montreal's 350th anniversary celebrations.

== Death ==
Mistral died on November 23, 2020, aged 56.

== Works ==
- Vamp, (1988)
- Vautour (1990)
- Fatalis (1992)
- Papier mâché/Carton-pâte (1989)
- Valium (2000)
- Sylvia au bout du rouleau ivre (2001)
- Vacuum (2003)
- Fontes (2004)
- Léon, Coco et Mulligan (2007)
