= De retour à la source =

Studio album by Isabelle Boulay
- Released: April 17, 2007
- Genre: Country
- Label: Audiogram
- Producer: Marc-André Chicoine

Isabelle Boulay chronology
Du Temps pour toi (2005)	De retour à la source (2007)	Nos Lendemains (2008)

De retour à la source is francophone Canadian pop singer Isabelle Boulay's fifth studio album. The album was released in 2007 and is a return to the singer's country music roots.

The album was nominated as one of the five finalists for the 2008 Juno Awards for the category "Francophone Album of The Year"

== Track listing ==
1. "Entre Matane et Baton Rouge"
2. "Un monde à refaire"
3. "Adrienne"
4. "Simplement tout"
5. "De retour à la source"
6. "Lui"
7. "Aller simple"
8. "Comme un jour sans amour"
9. "Tant que l'amour existera"
10. "Only a Woman's Heart"
11. "Si j'étais perdue"
12. "Mon village du bout du monde"

== Certifications ==
Country	Certification	Date	Sales certified
Canada	Platinum	May 8, 2007	100,000

== Charts ==
Chart	Peak position
Belgian (Wallonia) Albums Chart	32
French Albums Chart	87
Swiss Albums Chart	65
Canadian Albums Chart	2
