= Chansons pour les mois d'hiver =

Studio album by Isabelle Boulay
- Released: November 24, 2009
- Label: Audiogram

Isabelle Boulay chronology
Nos Lendemains (2008)	Chansons pour les mois d'hiver (2009)	Les grands espaces (2011)

Chansons pour les mois d'hiver is francophone Canadian pop singer Isabelle Boulay's seventh studio album, released in November 2009. It was certified gold in January 2010 as a result of selling 40,000 copies.

== Track listing ==
1. "Feignez de dormir" — 2:36
2. "Chanson pour les mois d'hiver" — 4:14
3. "L'Amitié" — 2:37
4. "Hors-saison" — 3:56
5. "Le Patineur" — 3:04
6. "La Ballade du chien-loup" — 6:34
7. "Je reviens chez vous" — 3:37
8. "Déranger les pierres" — 3:16
9. "Tennessee Waltz" — 2:47
10. "Shefferville, le dernier train" — 5:41
11. "Marie-Noël" — 3:07

== Certifications ==
Country	Certification	Date	Sales certified
Canada	Gold	January 21, 2010	40,000

== Charts ==
=== Weekly charts ===
Chart (2009)	Peak position
Canadian Albums (Billboard)	6
French Albums (SNEP)	173

=== Year-end charts ===
Chart (2010)	Position
Canadian Albums (Billboard)	43
