= Les Grands Espaces =

Studio album by Isabelle Boulay
- Released: November 8, 2011
- Genre: Country; Pop
- Label: Audiogram
- Producer: Benjamin Biolay

Isabelle Boulay chronology
Chansons pour les mois d'hiver (2009)	Les Grands Espaces (2011)	Merci Serge Reggiani (2014)

Les Grands Espaces is francophone Canadian pop singer Isabelle Boulay's eighth studio album, released in November 2011.

== Track listing ==
1. "Fin octobre, début novembre" (written by Mario Leblanc) — 3:10
2. "Souffrir par toi n'est pas souffrir" (lyrics by Étienne Roda-Gil, music by Julien Clerc) — 4:14
3. "Jolie Louise" (written by Daniel Lanois) — 2:52
4. "All I Want Is Love" (lyrics by Alyssa Bonagura, music by Ross Copperman) — 3:23
5. "Voulez-vous l'amour?" (written by Benjamin Biolay) — 3:30
6. "True Blue" (with Dolly Parton); written by Dolly Parton and James Newton Howard — 3:55
7. "Mille après mille" (written by Gérald Joly) — 3:47
8. "Les Grands Espaces" (written by Steve Marin) — 4:12
9. "Voyager léger" (written by Hubert Mounier) — 2:33
10. "Summer Wine" (with Benjamin Biolay); written by Lee Hazlewood — 4:46
11. "To Know Him Is to Love Him" (written by Phil Spector)— 3:07
12. "Où va la chance?" (written by Phil Ochs, French adaptation by Eddy Marnay) — 3:10
13. "Partir au loin" (lyrics by Eve Déziel, music by Michel Rivard)— 3:56
14. "Amour aime aussi nous voir tomber" (written by J.-L. Bergheaud) — 4:51
15. "At Last" (written by Harry Warren and Mack Gordon) — 3:30

This album was also released in a limited edition with three additional bonus tracks:

16. "Tout peut changer" — 4:11
17. "O Marie" — 3:41
18. "Crazy" — 4:10

== Charts ==
Chart (2011)	Peak position
Belgian Albums (Ultratop Wallonia)	16
Canadian Albums (Billboard)	9
French Albums (SNEP)	12
Swiss Albums (Schweizer Hitparade)	69

== Certifications ==
Region	Certification	Certified units/sales
Canada (Music Canada)	Gold	40,000^{^}
^{^} Shipments figures based on certification alone.
