= Chansons (TV program) =

- Genre: Folk music
- Directed by: Anton Vandewater
- Country of origin: Canada
- Original language: English
- No. of seasons: 1
- No. of episodes: 13

Production
- Executive producer: Jim Guthro
- Producer: Anton Vandewater
- Running time: 30 minutes

Original release
- Network: CBC Television
- Release: 3 November 1966 – 8 February 1967

Chansons is a Canadian music television program that aired on CBC Television from 1966 to 1969.

== Premise ==
This series of folk music performances was produced in colour as a Canadian Centennial project. Shooting locations included Alberta, British Columbia, Newfoundland, Nova Scotia, Ontario, Quebec. Performers included Christine Charbonneau, Bonnie Dobson, Jean-Pierre Ferland, Sheila Graham, Tom Kines, Claude Leveillee, Gordon Lightfoot, Catherine McKinnon, Joni Mitchell, The Travellers and George Walker. Pauline Julien French Canadian singer and songwriter hosted in 1965–66, the pendant of "Chansons" also broadcast in French and called "Mon pays mes chansons", Gemma Barra (singer and songwriter) replaced Julien in 1966 and continued through 1967.

== Scheduling ==
This half-hour program was broadcast Thursdays at 10:30 p.m. (North American Eastern time) from 3 November 1966 to 8 February 1967. It was rebroadcast for another run on Fridays at 5:30 p.m. from 4 July to 26 September 1969.
