= États d'amour =

- Cover art (Canada)

Studio album by Isabelle Boulay
- Released: 1998
- Genre: Pop
- Label: V2/Sidéral
- Producer: Olivier Bloch-Lainé

Isabelle Boulay chronology
Fallait pas (1996)	États d'amour (1998)	Scènes d'amour (2000)

États d'amour is francophone Canadian pop singer Isabelle Boulay's second studio album. It was released in Quebec in February 1998 and in France in November 1998, with a somewhat different sequence of tracks. Also, a limited edition was issued consisting of the French release together with a bonus mini-CD.

== Track listing (Canadian release) ==
1. "Je t'oublierai, je t'oublierai" (Lyrics: Luc Plamondon, music: Richard Cocciante)
2. "Le Banc des délaissés" (Zachary Richard)
3. "Les Yeux au ciel" (Lyrics: Damien Ruzé, music: Jacques Romenski)
4. "J'ai mal à l'amour" (Mario Peluso)
5. "L'Héroïne de cette histoire" (Zazie)
6. "N'oubliez jamais" (Lyrics: Jim Cregan, music: Russ Kunkel)
7. "État d'amour" (Lyrics: Roger Tabra, music: France D'Amour)
8. "La Lune" (Lyrics: Christian Mistral, music: Mario Peluso)
9. "Tombée de toi" (France D'Amour, Roger Tabra)
10. "L'Amour dans l'âme" (Zazie)
11. "Le Saule" (Lyrics: Francis Basset, music: Franck Langolff)
12. "Homme sweet homme" (Zazie)
13. "T'es pas mon fils" (Michel Barbeau)
14. "C'était l'hiver" (Francis Cabrel)
15. "L'Hymne à la beauté du monde" (Lyrics: Luc Plamondon, music: Christian St-Roch)
16. "Blanche comme la neige"

== Track listing (French release) ==
1. "Je t'oublierai, Je t'oublierai" (Lyrics: Luc Plamondon, music: Richard Cocciante) — 3:31
2. "État d'amour" (Lyrics: Roger Tabra, music: France D'Amour) — 4:06
3. "Le Saule" (Lyrics: Francis Basset, music: Franck Langolff) — 5:26
4. "L'Héroïne de cette histoire" (Zazie) — 4:29
5. "La Lune" (Lyrics: Christian Mistral, music: Mario Peluso) — 3:44
6. "N'oubliez jamais" (Lyrics: Jim Cregan, music: Russ Kunkel) — 4:15
7. "L'amour dans l'âme" (Zazie) — 4:47
8. "Les Yeux au ciel" (Lyrics: Damien Ruzé, music: Jacques Romenski) — 4:26
9. "T'es pas mon fils" (Michel Barbeau) — 2:42
10. "C'était l'hiver" (Francis Cabrel) — 4:07
11. "Le Banc des délaissés" (Zachary Richard) — 4:57

== Bonus mini-CD ==
This was recorded at the Théâtre Saint-Denis during the FrancoFolies de Montréal.

1. "D'aventures en aventures" (with Serge Lama)
2. "Amsterdam"
3. "La Ballade de Jean Batailleur"

== Charts ==
Chart (1999)	Peak position
French Albums Chart	60

== Certifications ==
Country	Certification	Date	Sales certified
Canada	Platinum	January 21, 1999	100,000
France	Gold	February 13, 2002	100,000
