= Scènes d'amour =

Live album by Isabelle Boulay
- Released: 2000
- Genre: Pop
- Label: Sidéral

Isabelle Boulay chronology
| États d'amour (1998) | Scènes d'amour (2000) | Mieux qu'ici-bas (2000) |

Scènes d'amour is francophone Canadian pop singer Isabelle Boulay's first live album, released in 2000.

Most tracks on the album were recorded in 1999 during the "Les FrancoFolies de Montréal" annual summer festival in Montreal, where she appeared on stage and sang with a host of famous guest stars. Tracks 8–9 were recorded in Studio Piccolo; the 17th was recorded when Boulay was on tour with Francis Cabrel during the fall of 1999.

== Track listing ==
1. "Les yeux au ciel" (feat. Barnev Valsaint) 5:38
2. "La ballade de Jean Batailleur" — 5:01
3. "Le retour de Don Quichotte" (feat. Michel Rivard) — 5:26
4. "L'héroïne de cette histoire" (feat. Éric Lapointe) — 4:39
5. "Planchers fragiles" (feat. Daniel Seff) — 3:09
6. "Tandem" — 5:01
7. "Tombée de toi" (feat. France d'Amour) — 3:08
8. "Le banc des délaissés" (feat. Zachary Richard) — 5:10
9. "Quand j'aime une fois, j'aime pour toujours" (feat. Gildor Roy) — 4:36
10. "J'ai mal à l'amour" (feat. Laurence Jalbert) — 4:05
11. "Frédéric" (feat. Claude Léveillée) — 3:19
12. "Perdus dans le même décor" (feat. Jim Corcoran) — 5:08
13. "Naufrage" (feat. Dan Bigras) — 3:36
14. "Couleur café" — 3:26
15. "D'aventures en aventures" (feat. Serge Lama) — 3:27
16. "Amsterdam" — 3:53
17. "C'était l'hiver" (feat. Francis Cabrel)— 3:46

== Charts ==
| Chart | Peak position |
|---|---|
| Canadian Albums Chart | 9 |

=== Year-end charts ===
| Chart (2000) | Position |
|---|---|
| Canadian Albums (Nielsen SoundScan) | 127 |
