= Du temps pour toi =

Du Temps pour toi

Live album by Isabelle Boulay
- Released: October 14, 2005
- Genre: Pop
- Label: Sony BMG, Sidéral

Isabelle Boulay chronology
Tout un jour (2004)	Du Temps pour toi (2005)	De retour à la source (2007)

Du temps pour toi is francophone Canadian pop singer Isabelle Boulay's third live album, released on October 14, 2005. It met a rather good success in Belgium (Wallonia) and France, where it reached the top twenty.

The album was also released as a DVD, launched about one month after the CD edition. It contains two duets with Johnny Hallyday and Julien Clerc, and also a medley.

== Track listing ==
1. "Intro" — 2:06
2. "Jamais" — 4:33
3. "Parle-moi" — 3:43
4. "Tout au bout de nos peines" Duet with Johnny Hallyday — 3:31
5. "Aimons-nous" — 3:43
6. "Je voudrais" — 2:34
7. "Du Temps pour toi" — 4:42
8. "Medley acoustique" ("Quelques pleurs", "Jamais assez loin", "Je t'oublierai, je t'oublierai") — 5:46
9. "La Vie devant toi" — 4:57
10. "En t'attendant" — 3:55
11. "Le Cœur volcan" — 3:22
12. "Mieux qu'ici-bas" — 3:57
13. "Les Séparés" Duet with Julien Clerc — 3:54
14. "Le Cœur combat" — 3:55
15. "Je sais ton nom" — 5:39
16. "Un Jour ou l'autre" — 4:02
17. "Une Autre Vie" — 8:44
18. "Le Petit Garçon" — 4:26

== Certifications ==
Country	Certification	Date	Sales certified	Physical sales
France	—	—	—	59,079 in 2005

== Charts ==
Chart (2005)	Peak position
Belgian (Wallonia) Albums Chart	7
French Digital Chart	7
French Albums Chart	16
French Videos Chart	8
Swiss Albums Chart	42

End of the year chart (2005)	Position
Belgian (Wallonia) Albums Chart	64
French Albums Chart	136
