= Parle-moi (Isabelle Boulay song) =

2000 single by Isabelle Boulay

Single by Isabelle Boulay

from the album Mieux qu'ici-bas
- B-side: "Je n'voudrais pas t'aimer"
- Released: October 2000
- Recorded: France
- Genre: Pop
- Length: 3:49
- Label: V2 Records
- Songwriter: J. Kapler
- Producer: J. Kapler

Isabelle Boulay singles chronology
"Je t'oublierai, je t'oublierai" (1999)	"Parle-moi" (2000)	"Un jour ou l'autre" (2001)

"Parle-moi" is a 2000 song recorded by the Canadian pop singer Isabelle Boulay. It was the first single from her fourth album Mieux qu'ici-bas, on which it features as the first track. Released in October 2000, this pop song/ballad achieved a great success in France and Belgium (Wallonia), reaching the highest positions on the charts.

== Song information ==
The song deals with a love relationship that comes to its end.

Isabelle Boulay performed the song during her 2002 and 2005 concerts, and thus it was available on her live albums Au moment d'être à vous (tenth track) and Du Temps pour toi (third track). The song was also included on the compilations Les Plus Belles Victoires de la Musique, Hits France 2001 and Hits 2001.

The song was covered by the Italian artist Claude Barzotti on the 2003 compilation Retour gagnant (sixth track). In 2006, the song was performed by Isabelle Boulay and Les 500 Choristes in a live version included on the album 500 Choristes vol. 2 as seventh track.

== Chart performance ==
"Parle-moi" is Boulay's most successful single in terms of sales and peak positions. In France, "Parle-moi" started at number eight on the Singles Chart edition ending on 14 October 2000, reached number two for two non consecutive weeks and totaled 12 weeks in the top ten, 22 weeks in the top 50 and 24 weeks in the top 100. The single was certified Gold disc by the SNEP, and ranked at number 20th on the year-end chart. "Parle-moi" charted for 22 weeks on the Ultratop 40, the Belgian (Wallonia) Singles Chart. It went to number 28 on 18 November 2000, climbed to number eight and topped the chart two weeks later. Then it spent three weeks at number two, three weeks at number three and two weeks at number four, and remained for a total of 13 weeks in the top ten and 22 weeks on the chart.

== Track listings ==
- CD single
1. "Parle-moi" – 3:49
2. "Je n'voudrais pas t'aimer" – 4:11
- Digital download
1. "Parle-moi" – 3:49
2. "Parle-moi" (live) – 3:43

== Charts ==
=== Weekly charts ===
Weekly chart performance for "Parle-moi"
Chart (2000–01)	Peak position
Belgium (Ultratop 50 Wallonia)	1
France (SNEP)	2

=== Year-end charts ===
2000 year-end chart performance for "Parle-moi"
Chart (2000)	Position
Belgium (Wallonia Ultratop 40)	66
France (SNEP)	20

2001 year-end chart performance for "Parle-moi"
Chart (2001)	Position
Belgium (Wallonia Ultratop 40)	35
Europe (Eurochart Hot 100)	100

== Certifications ==
Certifications for "Parle-moi"
Region	Certification	Certified units/sales
France (SNEP)	Gold	250,000^{*}
^{*} Sales figures based on certification alone.
