= Angèle Arsenault =

- Born: October 1, 1943; Abrams Village, Prince Edward Island, Canada
- Origin: Charlottetown, Prince Edward Island, Canada
- Died: February 25, 2014 (aged 70) Saint-Sauveur, Quebec, Canada
- Occupation: Singer-songwriter

Angèle Arsenault, OC OPEI (October 1, 1943 – February 25, 2014) was a Canadian-Acadian singer, songwriter and media host.

== Early life ==
Arsenault was born to Acadian parents Arthur and Joséphine in Abrams Village, Prince Edward Island, Canada in 1943. She was the eighth child out of fourteen children. She grew up surrounded by music because this medium was very popular among her family. The family would gather for kitchen parties, an important aspect of Acadian culture, and each would play a different musical instrument, and would sing songs passed down from older generations. By the age of 14, she was playing the piano and the guitar and won a televised singing contest in Charlottetown.

In 1965, she received her BA from the Université de Moncton followed by her MA from Université Laval in 1968. She then taught for one year, before moving to Montreal, Quebec, where her singing/songwriting career started in earnest.

== Career ==
Arsenault had started to perform in Moncton in 1963. She would play the guitar and piano and sing and collect traditional Acadian songs. After 1966 she lived in various places in Quebec, and appeared on television and in radio. She then toured parts of Canada. However, it was not until 1973 that she began to write and sing her own songs (in English and in French). Among these were Évangéline, Acadian Queen and Le monde de par chez nous.

For TVOntario, she hosted several shows, among others was the educational program Avec Angèle. In 1974, the program won a Gold Hugo Award at the Chicago International Film Festival. During the '70s, she released Première and an English album entitled Angèle Arsenault. However, it was with the release of her 1977 album Libre with which Arsenault garnered much success and fame.

Libre, which went triple platinum, contained songs that Arsenault is still remembered for today, such as Moi j'mange and De temps en temps moi j'ai les bleus. In 1979, she received the prestigious Felix Award for best-seller (Libre) in Quebec, and performed at a sold-out concert at the Place des Arts.

In 1979, she recorded her fourth album Y'a une étoile pour vous and the following year she received much acclaim at the Festival de Spa in Belgium. She then returned to Canada to record her fifth album. She also kept up her radio and television career, as much in Quebec as in the Maritimes. Arsenault collaborated with Sylvie Toupin to write a play entitled Pour le meilleur et pour le pire, which deals with violence against women.

Following the 1970s, the singer had built up a sizable fan base and solidified her popularity, as much as a singer as an Acadian pioneer in modern music. In 1975, she published a collection of poems entitled Première, released at the same time as her first album.

She appeared in several films for the National Film Board of Canada including Le temps de l'avant (1975). She also founded the Société de production et de programmation de spectacles with the impresario Lise Aubut and the singers Edith Butler and Jacqueline Lemay.

In 1994, she returned to music with the release of the album Transparente, which continued to show the world the artist's musical talents. This album featured the well-known songs Grand-Pré and Papa Arthur. She also continued to do tours in Quebec, as well as throughout Canada.

In 1996, she returned to Prince Edward Island to be closer to her family.

In 1997, she received the Ordre de la Pléiade de l'Association des parlementaires de langue française, recognizing her work in the promotion of the French language and culture.

She is also an honorary member of the Association canadienne des éducateurs de langue française, for which she sang and gave workshops.

She continued to write new songs and appeared at many festivals worldwide.

In 1999, she received an honorary doctorate from the University of Prince Edward Island. She also released that year an album of twelve songs entitled Amour, meant specifically for children (Arsenault herself had no children of her own).

In 2000, she received the title of Woman of the Year from Zonta International.

Her last known television work was with PassepArts, a television show for which she was its correspondent in Charlottetown and her last known place of residence was Summerside, Prince Edward Island.

On February 23, 2003, Arsenault received the Order of Canada.

== Death ==
Arsenault died on February 25, 2014, in Saint-Sauveur, Quebec, after a battle with cancer. She was 70.

== Discography ==
- Première (1975)
- Angèle Arsenault (1976)
- Libre (1977)
- C'est la récréation (1977) (with Édith Butler and Jacqueline Lemay)
- Y'a une étoile pour vous (1979)
- Chanter dans le soleil (1980)
- Paniquez pas pour rien (1982)
- Bonjour Madame Bolduc (1993)
- Transparente (1994)
- Noël c'est l'amour (1995)
- J'ai vécu bien des années (1995)
- Amour (1999)
- Des étoiles pour vous (2010)
- De souvenirs et d'amitié (2013)
- Vivre! (2014)
