= Nos lendemains =

Studio album by Isabelle Boulay
- Released: March 3, 2008
- Genre: Pop
- Label: V2

Isabelle Boulay chronology
De retour à la source (2007)	Nos lendemains (2008)	Chansons pour les mois d'hiver (2009)

Singles from Nos Lendemains
- 1. "Ton Histoire" Released: April 2008

Nos lendemains is francophone Canadian pop singer Isabelle Boulay's sixth studio album, released in March, 2008. A first single, "Ton Histoire", was available one month later and currently charted. The album hit the top ten in Belgium (Wallonia) and France.

There were three formats for this album : CD, CD collector edition and digital download.

== Track listing ==
1. "Dieu des amours" — 2:54
2. "Nos lendemains" — 3:11
3. "Ton histoire" — 3:31
4. "Où est ma vie?" — 3:21
5. "Ne me dis pas qu'il faut sourire" — 3:20
6. "Coucouroucoucou Paloma" — 3:50
7. "L'Amour d'un homme" — 3:13
8. "Juste une étoile" — 3:00
9. "N'aimer que t'aimer" — 3:59
10. "Reviens, reviens, reviens" — 3:01
11. "L'Appuntamento" — 3:57
12. "Je ne t'en veux pas" — 3:41
13. "Vouloir t'aimer" — 3:58

== Charts ==
Chart (2008)	Peak position
Belgian (Wallonia) Albums Chart	7
French Digital Chart	4
French Albums Chart	7
Swiss Albums Chart	22

== Certifications ==
Certifications for Nos Lendemains
Region	Certification	Certified units/sales
Canada (Music Canada)	Gold	50,000^{^}
^{^} Shipments figures based on certification alone.
