= Ginette Ravel =

Canadian singer and lyricist (born 1940)

- Born: Ginette Marie Thérèse Gravel; October 6, 1940; Joliette, Quebec, Canada
- Died: February 17, 2022 (aged 81)
- Occupations: Singer; Lyricist
- Spouse: Pierre Marcotte (m. 1964; div. 1968)
- Children: 1

Ginette Marie Thérèse Ravel (née Gravel; October 6, 1940 – February 17, 2022) was a Canadian singer and lyricist. She began her career as a singer in 1959 as a member of the La Cave cabaret. Ravel released several albums and singles throughout the course of her musical career before focusing on journalism. She was Canada's representative at the Sopot International Song Festival, Poland in 1968 and was awarded second prize.

== Biography ==
Ravel was born on October 6, 1940, in Joliette, Quebec, and had a sister. She spent the early part of her life in Joilette before moving to Montreal with her family at the age of 10. Ravel studied elocution with Jean-Louis Audet in Montreal from the age of nine, and also studied drama and piano, but decided on pursuing a career in music. Her singing career commenced at the cabaret La Cave at a music venue in Montreal in 1959, lasting a week, and winning the “Discovery of the Year” award in Montreal. Ravel performed alongside Marc Gélinas, and signed a contract with RCA Victor.

In May 1961, she made an appearance on the CHLT-TV programme Disqu'O-Vision. Ravel's debut album, Tu te souviendras de moi, was released in 1962, and there were multiple songs she composed with lyrics authored by Josette Marchessault. In 1961, she won the Grand Prix du Disque Canadien for her rendition of "Les Enfants du Pirée." In the following years, Ravel regularly topped the charts with songs such as "A Capri," "Quand le soleil était là," "Demain tu te maries," and her own interpretation of Charles Aznavour's "La mamma." Three further albums of hers were released L'amour c'est comme un jour in 1963, Avec l'amour in 1964 and the compilation Mes grands succès in 1965. Radio-Canada sent Ravel to the Monte Carlo Song Festival in 1963.

Ravel performed across the province of Quebec in cabarets, concerns, music halls, radio and television, in Creole, English, French and Japanese. She sung at such venues as the Séminaire Saint-Joseph de Trois-Rivières in 1965, and the La Comédie-Canadienne theatre group for a week in February 1966, returning to the venue on multiple occasions. She also performed at Maison des arts Desjardins Drummondville in March 1966, and in places such as Sherbrooke, Plessisville, and Casa Loma. Ravel performed in Paris from 1963 to 1964, and was selected to be the host of CKAC radio's Les Grand Prix du disque' in 1964 and CFTM-TV's variety show À La Catalogne with Pierre Marcotte in 1966. Her fifth album, Ginette Ravel à la Comédie Canadienne, was released in June 1966, based on a tune by Jean-Pierre Ferland. In late 1966, Ravel left for Paris, performing at club Le Carnal with Jean Méjean. She released her sixth album, Hourrah !, that same year.

In February 1967, Ravel appeared on the CFTM-TV program Venez donc chez moi, and performed at the Canadian Pavilion at Expo 67 and in Port-au-Prince, Haiti that Winter. That September, she released her eighth album A ta santé, la terre. Ravel conducted a six-day provincial tour of the cities of Quebec in early 1968, with Jacques Michel, and the Cabestans. That August, she was selected to be Canada's representative at the Sopot International Song Festival, Poland. Ravel performed the Ferland song, "Je reviens chez nous" (I'm coming home) and won the second prize. Two more albums, the compilation Succès souvenirs and Ginette Ravel au Théâtre Maisonneuve were released in 1968, and two more followed in 1969, J’irai par le monde and the compilation Succès souvenirs volume 2. During his time, she developed an alcohol addiction. In 1970, she released the album Ginette Ravel, and performed at the Salle Wilfrid-Pelletier.

Ravel resided in France between October 1971 and 1973, signing in cabarets, at the Canadian Cultural Centre and the Théâtre Récamier, Paris, and at the 1972 Festival de la chanson, Reims. She was sent by French television to the Rencontres Trans Musicales, Rennes, Brittany in 1971, and also had a short tour of Belgium and took part in a national campaign for the disabled and elderly. Ravel then lived in retirement in Canada from 1973 to 1975, recovering from a lung disease and alcoholism and later recording two of her own songs (music by Marc Fortier), 'Je suis fragile' and 'Du sable dans ma voix.' She appeared on the Radio-Canada television program Les Beaux Dimanches in 1974, and returned to live performance with a recital at the Boîte à chansons in Hôtel Meridien, Montreal in August 1976, signing at the venue twice more. This came after she was convinced to return to singing by her friend Pierre Péladeau. Ravel performed on the television program Vedettes en direct in January 1978. She hosted a Sunday morning call-in show on CKVL-FM, and published four autobiographies from 1978 to 1990, one of which was called Je bravos vis mon alcoolisme, and the others were Vivre 24 heures à la fois, J’ai vaincu la dépression and échappé au suicide.

In 1979, Ravel performed at the Place des Arts, Montreal, giving a recital of her songs, 'Encore une histoire d'amour'. That same year, she sung at the Essor féminin, La Tuque. In 1980, Ravel released the album La vérité, which contained American songs. She agreed to host the Second Montreal Esoteric Symposium at the Studio-Théâtre Alfred-Laliberté, Université du Québec, Montreal in May 1981. Ravel took up painting and exhibited 25 of her works at the Tournesol Gallery, Grand-Mère in mid-1981. A special program dedicated to her was broadcast on Radio-Canada on December 24, 1981, before focusing on a career in journalism.

== Personal life ==
She was married to Pierre Marcotte on June 9, 1964, and remained married until their divorce four years later. There was one child of the marriage. Ravel died on the morning of February 17, 2022.

== Technique ==
She had a deep voice. Renée Lacoursiere of Le Nouvelliste wrote Ravel "possesses all the sensitivity of an artist, with the rich voice of a passionate interpreter of chanson." La Tribune's Jean Naud said of her voice was "expressed through melodies charged with emotion, which she draws from herself, sometimes languidly, sometimes violently, but always with a profound sensitivity", adding she did not select her songs based on how they would appeal to her audience. She rehearsed for two hours a day with the pianist Paul de Margerie.
