= Marianne Dugal =

Canadian pianist and violinist

Marianne Dugal is a Canadian violinist and pianist from Quebec and a member of the Montreal Symphony Orchestra, where she played under Charles Dutoit, Kent Nagano, and Rafael Payare. She studied at the Harid Conservatory under Sergiu Schwartz before winning first prize at the National Society of Arts and Letters' Violin Competition. She is also a member of I Musici de Montréal Chamber Orchestra, in which she appeared on both the English and French language channels.
