= Calixte Duguay =

Canadian artist

Calixte Duguay CM ONB (born July 15, 1939) is a multi-disciplinarian Canadian artist born in Ste-Marie-St-Raphaël, on Lamèque Island.

In 2009, he was made a Member of the Order of Canada "for the impact he has had on the Acadian and Canadian music scene as a writer, composer and singer".

In 2011 he was awarded the Lieutenant-Governor's Award for High Achievement in the Arts for his music. In 2012, he was made a member of the Order of New Brunswick.

== Discography ==
- Les aboiteaux
- Louis Mailloux (first production – 1979)
- Retour à Richibouctou
- Rien que pour toi
- Les couleurs de ma vie
- De terre et d'eau
- Louis Mailloux (new production, 1993)

=== Bibliography ===
- Odette Castonguay, Calixte Duguay : aussi longtemps que je vivrai, Tracadie-Sheila: Grande Marée, 2006, ISBN 978-2-349-72241-6.
- Calixte Duguay, Alentour de l'île et de l'eau, Éditions du kapociré, 1996.
- Calixte Duguay et Jules Boudreau, Louis Mailloux, Éditions d'Acadie, 1994.
