= Jacques Michel =

Canadian singer-songwriter (1941–2026)

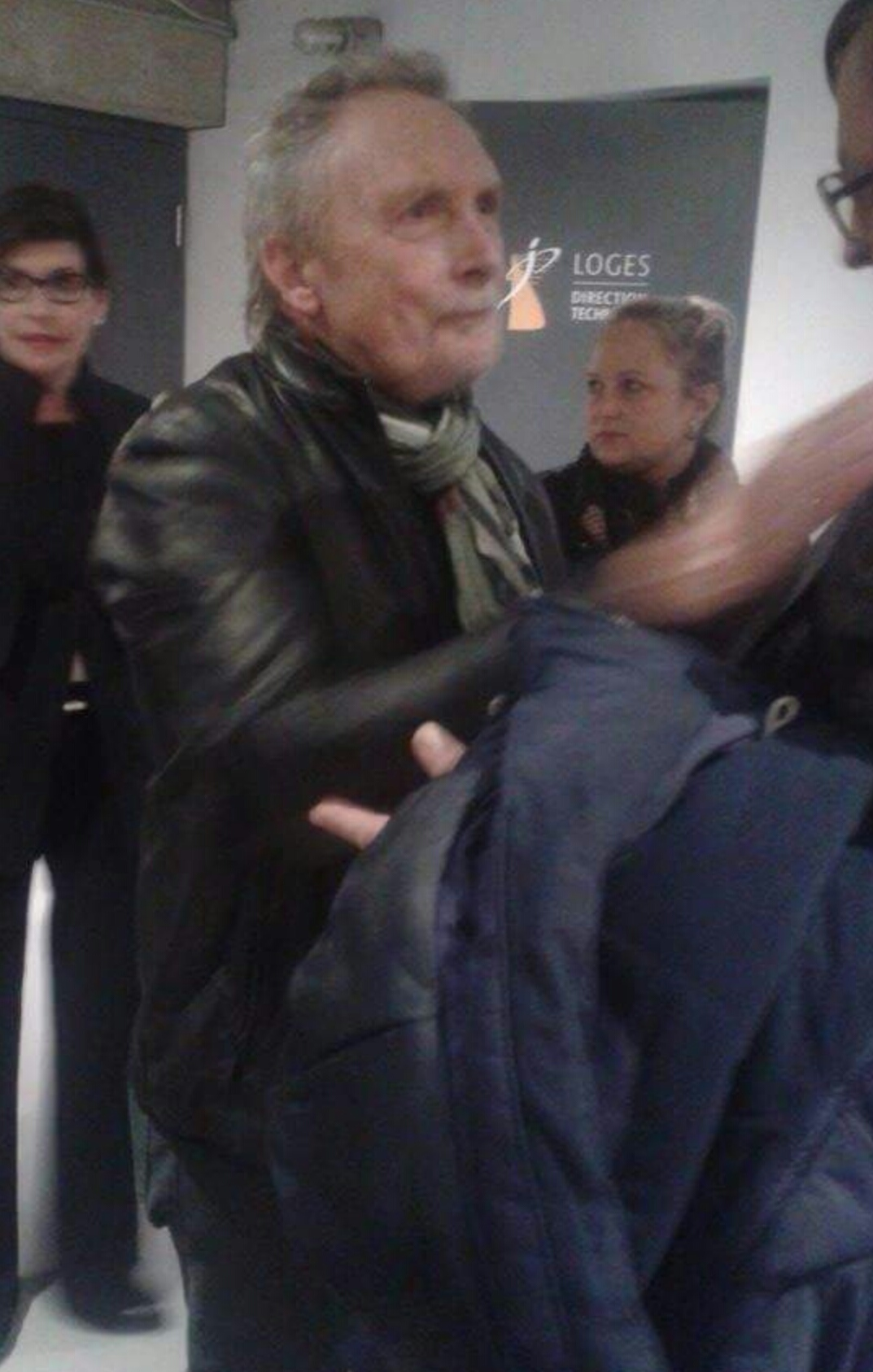
- Michel in 2016
- Born: Jacques Rodrigue; 27 June 1941; Sainte-Agnès-de-Bellecombe, Quebec, Canada
- Died: 5 March 2026 (aged 84)
- Occupation: Singer-songwriter

Jacques Rodrigue (27 June 1941 – 5 March 2026), better known by the stage name Jacques Michel, was a Canadian singer-songwriter. He was notably the recipient of the Grand Prix de Festival de Spa in 1970.

Michel died on 5 March 2026, at the age of 84.

== Discography ==
- Jacques Michel... et ses chansons (1965)
- Jacques Michel (1967)
- Jacques Michel (1968)
- Jacques Michel (1969)
- Citoyen d'Amérique (1970)
- S.O.S. (1971)
- Pas besoin de frapper pour entrer (1972)
- Dieu ne se mange plus... (1973)
- C'que j'ai l'goût d'dire (1974)
- Migration (1975)
- Ma nouvelle saison (1976)
- Le Temps d'aimer... (1977)
- Le Cœur plus chaud (1978)
- Passages (1980)
- Maudit que j'm'aime ! (1982)
- Un nouveau jour (2015)
