= Isabelle Boulay =

Canadian singer

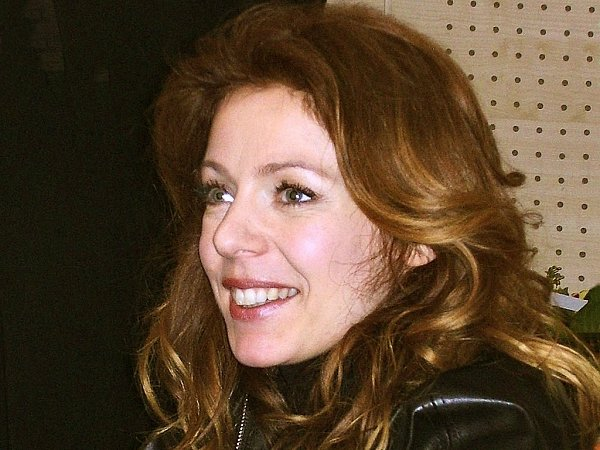
- Boulay in March 2008

Background information
- Born: Isabelle Boulay; 6 July 1972 (age 53)
- Origin: Sainte-Félicité, Quebec, Canada
- Genres: Folk, country, pop music
- Occupation: Singer
- Years active: 1993–present
- Labels: Polydor, Universal Music Group, Audiogram
- Partner(s): Stéphane Rousseau (2000–2003); Éric Dupond-Moretti (2016–present)
- Website: isabelleboulay.com

Isabelle Boulay, CQ (French pronunciation: [izabɛl bulɛ]; born 6 July 1972) is a Canadian singer.

== Biography ==
Born in Sainte-Félicité, Quebec, where her parents owned a restaurant, Boulay moved to the nearby city of Matane at the start of her adolescence, and studied literature at Cégep Limoilou. In 1988, her friends signed her up, without her knowledge, for a singing contest in Matane, where she made the acquaintance of Josélito Michaud, who later became her agent. In 1990, at the Petite-Vallée song festival, she won an award for her performance of "Les gens de mon pays" (Gilles Vigneault). The following year, in 1991, she won the Granby Song Festival for her renditions of "Amsterdam" (Jacques Brel) and "Naufrage" (Dan Bigras). She was also invited to take part in the festival Les FrancoFolies de Montréal. In 1992, she performed in France at the Théâtre Dejazet, introducing Bill Deraime. In 1993, she represented Radio Canada at the "Truffe de Périgueux" festival held in Périgord, France, and was awarded the prize for Best Singer in the "Chanson francophone" category.

Following Boulay's success in France, she was noticed by songwriter Luc Plamondon, who was looking for emerging talents to perform in a new production of his rock opera Starmania. There, Boulay portrayed the role of Marie-Jeanne from 1995 to 1998. She also provided the singing voice for Quebec singer Alys Robi in the TV miniseries of the same name, adding to her popularity in Quebec.

In 1996, Boulay released her debut album, Fallait pas, written and produced by Daniel DeShaime. She also participated again in Les FrancoFolies de Montréal. She began recording her second album, États d'amour, in 1997; it was released in Quebec in February 1998 and sold well, being certified gold by September. The album was released in France in November. In 1998, she was also nominated for four Félix Awards but failed to win any. In 1999, the single "Je t'oublierai, je t'oublierai" from États d'amour peaked at No. 33 on the French charts. Boulay made a number of media appearances in France in 1999, and, in the summer, sang again in the FrancoFolies de Montréal, where the live album Scènes d'amour was recorded. She also performed with Serge Lama at the Olympia and introduced Francis Cabrel on tour, as well as Julien Clerc during his tour in Montreal. In October, she was given the Félix Award for female singer of the year.

Since then, Boulay has had considerable success both in Quebec and in Europe. Her biggest-selling album in France was the 2000 release Parle-moi. On 14 February 2008, she was presented with the medal of the National Assembly of Quebec by the mayor of her hometown, in recognition of her contribution to the arts. Beginning 2001-2004, the French media began referring to Boulay as one of the grandes voix québécoises (great Quebecois voices) at the centre of contemporary trends in popular music. Other singers grouped in this category included Lara Fabian, Céline Dion, Natasha St-Pier, Garou, Daniel Lavoie, Lynda Lemay, Bruno Pelletier and Roch Voisine. However, the musicologist Catherine Rudent concludes that only Fabian, Dion and St-Pier truly resemble Boulay in répertoire, voice and techniques of interpretation. These singers have in common a style inherited from soul music, in which expressive vocality takes priority over the text, making full use of registers of the chest and head, vocal ornamentation and improvisation.

Boulay was a coach on La Voix for its second, third, and fifth editions. In March 2019, she was one of 11 singers from Quebec, alongside Ginette Reno, Diane Dufresne, Céline Dion, Luce Dufault, Louise Forestier, Laurence Jalbert, Catherine Major, Ariane Moffatt, Marie Denise Pelletier and Marie-Élaine Thibert, who participated in a supergroup recording of Renée Claude's 1971 single "Tu trouveras la paix" after Claude's diagnosis with Alzheimer's disease was announced.

=== Personal life ===
In October 2008, Boulay and her producer Marc-Andre Chicoine, had their first child together, Marcus Andrew.

Since 2016, she is living with the French Minister of Justice, Éric Dupond-Moretti.

== Awards and recognition ==
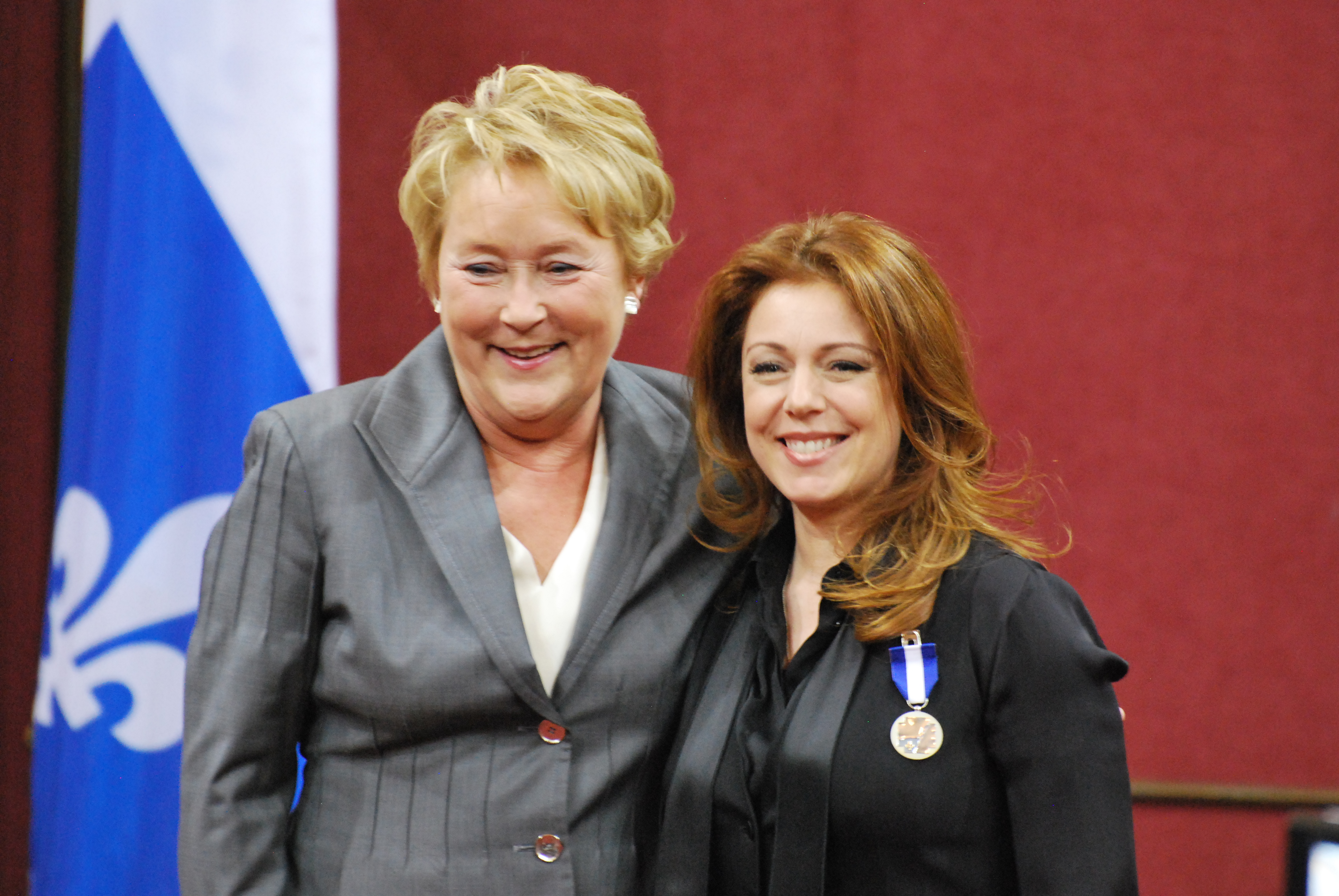
Isabelle Boulay receiving the National Order of Quebec.

- 1999, 2000, 2001, 2002, 2003, 2007, 2008: Félix Award: Female singer of the year
- 2000: Félix Award: Pop album of the year (Scènes d'amour)
- 2001: Victoires de la musique: discovery of the year for artist and album (Mieux qu'ici-bas)
- 2001: Félix Awards: Pop album of the year (Mieux qu'ici-bas)
- 2001, 2005, 2007, 2008: Félix Award: Show of the year (singer)
- 2001: Juno Awards: nomination for Best Female Artist, two nominations for Best Selling Francophone Album (Mieux qu'ici bas, Scènes d'Amour)
- 2005, 2008: Félix Award: Quebec artist best known outside Quebec
- 2007: Félix Award: Country album of the year (De retour à la source)
- 2008: Juno Awards: nomination for Francophone Album of the Year (De retour à la source)
- 2012: Made a Knight of the National Order of Quebec
- 2012: Made a knight of the Order of La Pléiade

== Discography ==
=== Studio albums ===
Year	Title	Certification (France)	Certification (Canada)	Peak positions				
Year	Title	Certification (France)	Certification (Canada)	FR	FR (DD)	BE (WA)	SWI	CAN
1996	Fallait pas	—	—	—	—	—	—	
1998	États d'amour	Gold (2002)	Platinum (1999)	60	—	—	—	
2000	Mieux qu'ici-bas	Diamond (2002)	—	6	—	4	65	4
2004	Tout un jour	2xGold (2004)	Gold (2004)	4	—	3	11	2
2007	De retour à la source	—	Platinum (2007)	87	—	32	65	2
2008	Nos Lendemains	—	Gold (2009)	7	4	7	22	1
2009	Chansons pour les mois d'hiver	—	Gold (2010)	173	—	—	—	6
2011	Les grands espaces	Platinum (2012)	Gold (2012)	12	—	16	69	9
2014	Merci Serge Reggiani		Gold (2015)	5	—	8	40	—
2017	En vérité			8	—	5	16	9
2019	En attendant Noël			71	—	—	—	5
2023	Boulay chante Bashung			88	—	35	73	—

=== Live albums ===
Year	Title	Certification (France)	Peak position				
Year	Title	Certification (France)	FR	FR (DD)	BE (WA)	SWI	CAN
2000	Scènes d'amour	—	—	—	—	—	9
2002	Au moment d'être à vous	Platinum (2004)	4	—	5	8	7
2005	Du Temps pour toi	—	16	7	7	42	

=== Compilations ===
Year	Title	Peak position
Year	Title	CAN
2002	Ses plus belles histoires	10
2012	Master série	—

=== Soundtracks ===
Year	Title
1995	Alys Robi
2002	Séraphin: un homme et son péché

=== Singles ===
Year	Title	Certification (France)	Peak position			Album
Year	Title	Certification (France)	FR	BE (WA)	SWI	Album
1996	"J'enrage"	—	—	—	—	Fallait pas
1996	"Et mon cœur en prend plein la gueule"					Fallait pas
1996	"Un peu d'innocence"			41		Fallait pas
1998	"Je t'oublierai, je t'oublierai"	—	33	—	—	États d'amour
1998	"Le Saule"	—	—	—	—	États d'amour
1998	"La Lune"	—	—	—	—	États d'amour
1998	"États d'amour"	—	—	—	—	États d'amour
2000	"Parle-moi"	Gold (2000)	2	1	—	Mieux qu'ici-bas
2001	"Un Jour ou l'autre"	—	31	22	—	Mieux qu'ici-bas
2001	"Quelques pleurs"	—	—	—	—	Mieux qu'ici-bas
2001	"Jamais assez loin"	—	—	—	—	Mieux qu'ici-bas
2001	"Mieux qu'ici-bas"	—	—	—	—	Mieux qu'ici-bas
2002	"Sans toi" (live)	—	—	—	—	Au moment d'être à vous
2003	"Depuis le premier jour"	—	—	—	—	Séraphin: un homme et son péché
2004	"C'est quoi, c'est l'habitude"	—	—	—	—	Tout un jour
2004	"Tout au bout de nos peines"	Silver (2004)	3	7	23	Tout un jour
2005	"Une Autre Vie"	—	—	—	—	Du temps pour toi
2008	"Ton Histoire"	—	14	39	—	Nos Lendemains
2009	"Chanson pour les mois d'hiver"					Chansons pour les mois d'hiver
2011	"Fin octobre, début novembre"		78	44		Les grands espaces
2014	"Il suffirait de presque rien"		165	—	—	Merci Serge Reggiani
