= Pierre Morency =

French Canadian writer, poet and playwright

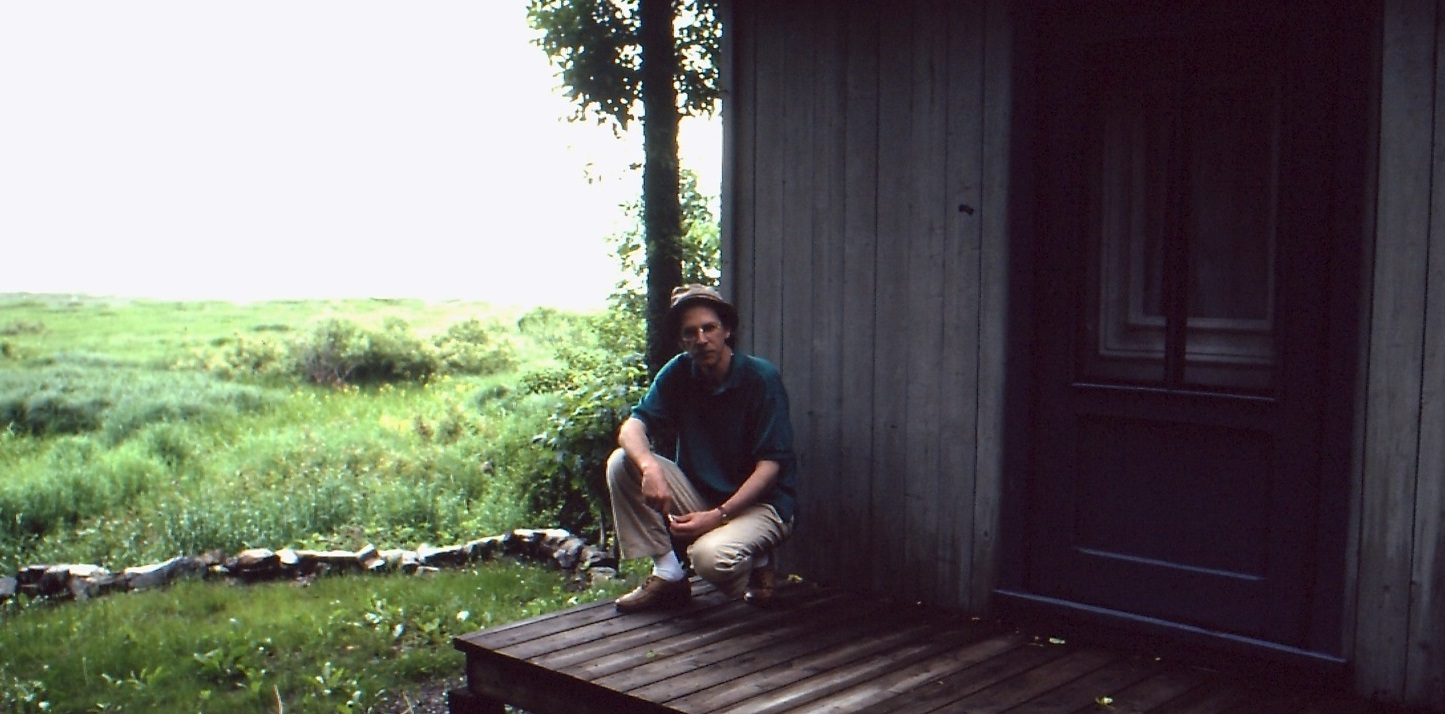
- Born: 8 May 1942 (age 84); Lauzon, Quebec

Pierre Morency, OC CQ (born 8 May 1942) is a French Canadian writer, poet and playwright.

== Life ==
Born in Lauzon, Quebec, he received a Bachelor of Arts degree from the Collège de Lévis in 1963 and a teaching diploma from the Université Laval in 1966.

== Awards ==
In 2002, Morency was made an officer of the Order of Canada and "is considered one of the most important poets of his generation, drawing his inspiration from the various expressions of life". In 2005, he was made a knight of the National Order of Quebec. In 2000, he was awarded the Quebec government's Prix Athanase-David.

== Selected bibliography ==
- L'Oeil américain, winner of the 1989 Governor General's Awards
- Lumière des oiseaux, winner of the 1992 Governor General's Awards
- La Vie entière — Histoires naturelles du Nouveau Monde, winner of the 1997 Governor General's Awards
