= Pauline Julien =

- Born: May 23, 1928; Trois-Rivières, Quebec, Canada
- Died: October 1, 1998 (aged 70) Montreal, Quebec, Canada
- Occupations: singer-songwriter, actress and activist
- Instruments: vocals
- Label: Kébec-Disc
- Spouse: Gérald Godin

Pauline Julien, CQ (May 23, 1928 – October 1, 1998), nicknamed "La Renarde", was a singer, songwriter, actress, feminist activist and Quebec sovereigntist.

== Biography ==
Born in Trois-Rivières, Quebec, Julien was the companion of the poet and Québec provincial MLA Gérald Godin, another Trifluvian and sovereignist. Julien performed pro-independence songs in Montréal clubs as early as 1964. In 1965 she hosted the CBC television series Mon pays, mes chansons. At the CBC she also collaborated and recorded with pianist Herbert Ruff, and performed on the program On Stage.

In 1970, Julien and Godin were arrested during the October Crisis and were released eight days later without charge.

== Death and legacy ==
In 1994, France decorated her with the title Chevalier des Arts et des Lettres. Julien was made a Chevalière de l'Ordre national du Québec.

Julien developed aphasia. She died in early October 1998 in Montreal, from suicide.

She was the subject of the 2018 documentary film Pauline Julien, Intimate and Political (Pauline Julien, intime et politique). In 2026, she was portrayed by Suzanne Clément in the biographical drama film Pauline (Pauline Julien: femme pays) by Anaïs Barbeau-Lavalette.

== Discography ==
- 1962 - Enfin Pauline Julien
- 1963 - Pauline Julien
- 1964 - Pauline Julien à la Comédie canadienne
- 1965 – Pauline Julien chante Raymond Levesque
- 1966 – Pauline Julien chante Boris Vian
- 1967 – Suite québécoise
- 1969 – Comme je crie… comme je chante… (textes de Gilbert Langevin)
- 1971 – Fragile
- 1972 – Au milieu de ma vie, peut-être la veille de....
- 1973 – Aller voir, vous avez des ailes
- 1974 – Licence complète
- 1975 – En scène
- 1976 – Tout ou rien (Récital Brecht)
- 1978 – Les 7 péchés capitaux
- 1978 – Femmes de paroles
- 1979 – Mes amies d'filles (Kebec Disc KD-949)
- 1980 – Fleur de peau
- 1984 – Où peut-on vous toucher ?
- 1993 – Pauline Julien (Collection Québec Love)
- 1996 – Pauline Julien
- 1997 – Brecht & Weill
- 1998 – Au temps des boîtes à chansons
- 1998 – Les années de la Butte à Mathieu

== Movies ==
- 1964 : Fabienne sans son Jules
- 1964 : The Earth to Drink (La Terre à boire) : Diane
- 1967 : Between Salt and Sweet Water (Entre la mer et l'eau douce) : Elle-même
- 1971 : La Nuit de la poésie 27 mars 1970
- 1973 : The Death of a Lumberjack (La Mort d'un bûcheron) : Charlotte Juillet
- 1974 : Bulldozer : Mignonne Galarneau

== See also ==
- List of Quebec musicians
- List of Mauriciens
- Music of Quebec
- Gérald Godin
