= Édith Butler =

Acadian-Canadian singer-songwriter and folklorist (born 1942)

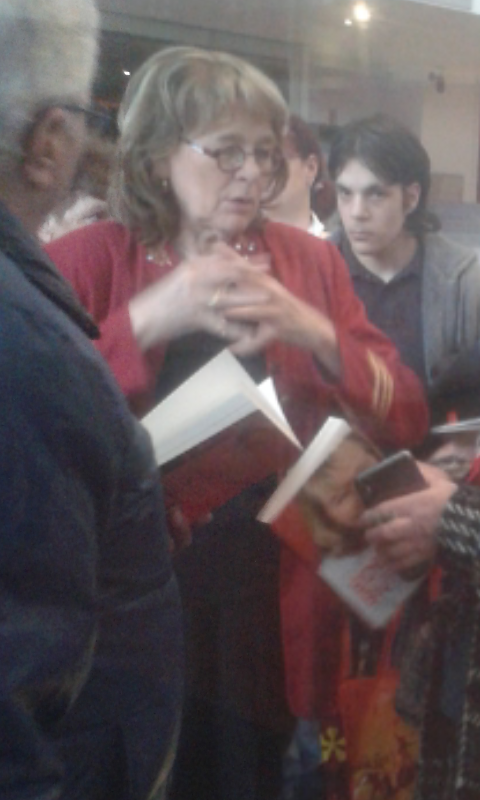
Butler in 2017

Édith Butler OC CQ ONB (born Marie Nicole Butler; 27 July 1942) is an Acadian-Canadian singer-songwriter and folklorist from New Brunswick’s Acadian Peninsula.

== Biography ==
Édith Butler was born on 27 July 1942, in Paquetville. During the 1960s, she obtained a Bachelor of Arts, taught school, and then earned a Master’s degree in literature and traditional ethnography at Laval University in 1969.

=== Career in music ===
Her career began in the early 1960s with performances in Moncton. In 1969, she released her debut album, "Chansons d’Acadie," of traditional Acadian songs. This was followed by national appearances on CBC Television's Singalong Jubilee where she gained popularity and began to receive invitations to participate in various Canadian and American folk festivals.

In the early 1970s, she represented Canada at the Universal Exposition in Osaka and performed in over 500 performances across Japan. Following this, she made several musical tours in Europe, notably in Ireland, Germany and the United States.

In total, Butler released 28 albums between 1969 and 2021. As of 2019, when she was inducted into the Canadian Songwriters Hall of Fame, Édith Butler had one gold and two platinum records.

=== Career in theater ===
Butler also performed in a piece by Antonine Maillet entitled "Le tintamarre".

== Honours ==
- Butler was appointed an Officer of the Order of Canada in June 1975.
- She was one of the four musicians pictured on the second series of the Canadian Recording Artist Series issued by Canada Post stamps on 2 July 2009.
- In 2009, she received the Governor General's Performing Arts Award for Lifetime Artistic Achievement, Canada's highest honour in the performing arts.
- In 2010, Butler was the recipient of the Lifetime Achievement Award at the 2010 French SOCAN Awards in Montreal.
- In 2012 she received the Lieutenant-Governor's Award for High Achievement in the Arts for Performing Arts.
- In 2013, she was made a member of the Order of New Brunswick
- In 2019, Édith Butler was inducted into the Canadian Songwriters Hall of Fame
