= NU Waves Tour =

2016 concert tour by The Neighbourhood

- Tour by The Neighbourhood
- Location: North America
- Associated album: Hard to Imagine the Neighbourhood Ever Changing
- Start date: May 6, 2016
- End date: June 18, 2016
- No. of shows: 27 in total
- Supporting acts: Allie X; LANY; Shamir

The Neighbourhood concert chronology
- The Flood Tour (2015); NU Waves Tour (2016); The Middle of Somewhere Tour (2019)

The NU Waves Tour was the fifth concert tour by American alternative rock band The Neighbourhood. The tour was launched in support of their third studio album, Hard to Imagine the Neighbourhood Ever Changing.

Spanning North America, the tour began on May 6, 2016, in Seattle, Washington at The Showbox and concluded on June 18, 2016, in Dover, Delaware at Firefly Music Festival.

In early 2016, The Neighbourhood announced the NU Waves Tour as their fifth headlining concert tour. The tour supported their third studio album, Hard to Imagine, and continued the band's presence in the North American alternative rock circuit following previous touring cycles. The tour featured performances in major cities across the United States, including theater venues and festival appearances.

== Setlist ==
1. "Ferrari"
2. "Greetings From Califournia"
3. "Prey"
4. "Jealou$y"
5. "Baby Came Home"
6. "Single"
7. "Female Robbery"
8. "Wires"
9. "Daddy Issues"
10. "Wiped Out!"
11. "Afraid"
12. "Baby Came Home 2"
13. "Cry Baby"
14. "W.D.Y.W.F.M?"
15. "Let It Go"
16. "Warm"
17. "Sweater Weather"
18. "R.I.P. 2 My Youth"

== Shows ==
List of 2016 concerts
Date	City	Country	Venue	Opening act
May 6, 2016	Seattle	United States	The Showbox	Allie X
May 7, 2016	Portland	United States	Roseland Theater	Allie X
May 9, 2016	Oakland	United States	Fox Oakland Theatre	Allie X
May 10, 2016	Ventura	United States	Majestic Theater	Allie X
May 11, 2016	Los Angeles	United States	Microsoft Theater	Allie X
May 13, 2016	Magna	United States	Saltair	Allie X
May 14, 2016	Denver	United States	Ogden Theatre	LANY
May 16, 2016	Dallas	United States	South Side Ballroom	LANY
May 17, 2016	Austin	United States	Stubb's Bar-B-Q	LANY
May 18, 2016	Houston	United States	Revention Music Center	LANY
May 21, 2016 (Note: Part of the 2016 Hangout Music Festival)	Gulf Shores	United States	Gulf Shores Beach	—N/a
May 23, 2016	Charlotte	United States	The Fillmore	LANY
May 24, 2016	Atlanta	United States	Buckhead Theatre	LANY
May 25, 2016	Nashville	United States	Marathon Music Works	LANY
May 31, 2016	Kansas City	United States	Arvest Bank Theatre	LANY
June 1, 2016	St Louis	United States	The Pageant	LANY
June 3, 2016	Milwaukee	United States	Pabst Theater	LANY
June 4, 2016 (Note: Part of the 2016 Bunbury Festival)	Cincinnati	United States	Sawyer Point Park & Yeatman's Cove	—N/a
June 7, 2016	Indianapolis	United States	Old National Centre	Shamir
June 8, 2016	Columbus	United States	Newport Music Hall	Shamir
June 10, 2016 (Note: Part of the 2016 Keloorah Festival)	Brooklyn	United States	Michigan International Speedway	Shamir
June 11, 2016	Cleveland	United States	House of Blues	Shamir
June 13, 2016	Buffalo	United States	Town Ballroom	Shamir
June 14, 2016	Providence	United States	Lupo's Heartbreak Hotel	Shamir
June 15, 2016	New York City	United States	Terminal 5	Shamir
June 17, 2016	New Haven	United States	College Street Music Hall	Shamir
June 18, 2016 (Note: Part of the 2016 Firefly Music Festival)	Dover	United States	Dover International Speedway	—N/a
