= The Middle of Somewhere Tour =

2019 concert tour by The Neighbourhood

- Tour by The Neighbourhood
- Location: North America
- Associated album: Chip Chrome & the Mono-Tones
- Start date: October 11, 2019
- End date: November 16, 2019
- No. of shows: 19 in total
- Supporting acts: Claud; Slow Hollows
- Producer: Live Nation

The Neighbourhood concert chronology
- NU Waves Tour (2016); The Middle of Somewhere Tour (2019); Wourld Tour (2026)

The Middle of Somewhere Tour was the sixth concert tour by American alternative rock band The Neighbourhood. The tour supported their fourth studio album, Chip Chrome & the Mono-Tones.

Spanning North America, the tour began on October 11, 2019, at The Chelsea at Cosmopolitan of Las Vegas in Las Vegas and concluded on November 16, 2019, at the Arvest Bank Theatre at The Midland in Kansas City. A total of 19 shows were performed.

== Background ==
In support of their fourth album, Chip Chrome & The Mono-Tones, The Neighbourhood embarked on a North American leg titled the Middle of Somewhere Tour. The tour featured performances across major cities in the United States and Canada, highlighting the band's evolving monochromatic aesthetic and the conceptual “Chip Chrome” persona introduced during the album cycle.

The production incorporated cinematic lighting, chrome-inspired visuals, and a darker stage design consistent with the album's themes of identity, isolation, and self-reflection. The setlist combined new material with earlier hits from the band's catalog.

== Setlist ==
1. "Middle of Somewhere"
2. "Lost in Translation"
3. "Wiped Out!"
4. "Greetings From Califournia"
5. "The Beach"
6. "Daddy Issues"
7. "Void"
8. "Blue"
9. "Livin' in a Dream"
10. "Compass"
11. "Afraid"
12. "You Get Me So High"
13. "Prey"
14. "Ferrari"
15. "R.I.P. 2 My Youth"
16. "Sweater Weather"
17. "24/7"
18. "Stuck With Me"

== Tour dates ==
List of 2019 concerts
Date	City	Country	Venue	Opening act
October 11, 2019	Las Vegas	United States	The Chelsea	Claud; Slow Hollows
October 12, 2019	Phoenix	United States	The Van Buren	Claud; Slow Hollows
October 18, 2019 (Note: Part of the 2019 Tecate Coordenada)	Zapopan	Mexico	Explanada Estadio Akron	—N/a
October 19, 2019 (Note: Part of the 2019 Live Out Monterrey)	Monterrey	Mexico	Parque Fundidora	—N/a
October 22, 2019	Mexico City	Mexico	Pepsi Center WTC	—N/a
October 26, 2019 (Note: Part of the 2019 Tecate Península)	Tijuana	Mexico	Parque Morelos	—N/a
October 31, 2019	Lake Buena Vista	United States	House of Blues	Claud; Slow Hollows
November 1, 2019	Fort Lauderdale	United States	Revolution Live	Claud; Slow Hollows
November 2, 2019	Tampa	United States	The Ritz Ybor	Claud; Slow Hollows
November 4, 2019	Athens	United States	Georgia Theatre	Claud; Slow Hollows
November 5, 2019	Charlotte	United States	The Fillmore	Claud; Slow Hollows
November 6, 2019	Raleigh	United States	The Ritz	Claud; Slow Hollows
November 8, 2019	Pittsburgh	United States	Stage AE	Claud; Slow Hollows
November 9, 2019	Detroit	United States	The Fillmore Detroit	Claud; Slow Hollows
November 11, 2019	Columbus	United States	Express Live!	Claud; Slow Hollows
November 12, 2019	Cincinnati	United States	Bogart's	Claud; Slow Hollows
November 14, 2019	Indianapolis	United States	Old National Centre	Claud; Slow Hollows
November 15, 2019	St Louis	United States	The Pageant	Claud; Slow Hollows
November 16, 2019	Kansas City	United States	Arvest Bank Theatre	Claud; Slow Hollows
