= The Drought Tour =

2013 concert tour by The Neighbourhood

- Tour by The Neighbourhood
- Associated album: I Love You
- Start date: February 3, 2013
- End date: March 21, 2013
- Legs: 2
- No. of shows: 18 in Europe; 4 in North America; 22 in total
- Producer: Live Nation

The Neighbourhood concert chronology
- The Drought Tour (2013); The Love Collection Tour (2013)

The Drought Tour was the debut headlining concert tour by American alternative rock band The Neighbourhood, launched in support of their first studio album, I Love You. Spanning from 3 February to 21 March 2013, the tour marked the group's first major international outing and played a significant role in establishing their early global fanbase.

The tour began on 3 February 2013 at the Marquee Theatre in Tempe, Arizona, and concluded on 21 March 2013 at the Roundhouse in London, England. Covering North America and Europe, The Drought Tour consisted of 22 shows across two legs.

== Setlist ==
1. "Greetings From Califournia"
2. "Prey
3. "Baby Came Home"
4. "Female Robbery"
5. "Wires"
6. "Daddy Issues"
7. "Wiped Out!"
8. "Baby Came Home 2"
9. "Cry Baby"
10. "The Beach"
11. "Afraid"
12. "Warm"
13. "Sweater Weather"
14. "R.I.P. 2 My Youth"

== Tour dates ==
List of 2013 concerts
Date	City	Country	Venue
February 3, 2013	Tempe	United States	Marquee Theatre
February 5, 2013	Pomona	United States	Fox Theater Pomona
February 6, 2013	Santa Ana	United States	The Observatory
February 7, 2013	Santa Ana	United States	The Observatory
February 24, 2013	Saint Petersburg	Russia	A2
February 25, 2013	Moscow	Russia	Yotaspace
February 27, 2013	Minsk	Belarus	Prime Hall
February 28, 2013	Kiev	Ukraine	Atlas
March 1, 2013	Warsaw	Poland	Klub Stodoła
March 2, 2013	Gdańsk	Poland	B90
March 3, 2013	Poznań	Poland	Międzynarodowe Targi Poznańskie
March 5, 2013	Prague	Czech Republic	Lucerna Music Bar
March 6, 2013	Hamburg	Germany	Gruenspan
March 8, 2013	Zurich	Switzerland	Härterei Club
March 9, 2013	Milan	Italy	Alcatraz
March 12, 2013	Frankfurt	Germany	Gibson Club
March 14, 2013	Brussels	Belgium	Ancienne Belgique
March 16, 2013	Paris	France	La Cigale
March 18, 2013	Portsmouth	England	Portsmouth Pyramids Centre
March 19, 2013	Birmingham	England	O2 Institute
March 20, 2013	Manchester	England	The Ritz
March 21, 2013	London	England	Roundhouse
