= The Flood Tour =

2015 concert tour by The Neighbourhood

- Tour by The Neighbourhood
- Associated album: Wiped Out!
- Start date: September 14, 2015
- End date: October 30, 2015
- No. of shows: 28 in total
- Supporting acts: Hunny; Bad Suns

The Neighbourhood concert chronology
- El Tour Blanco (2014); The Flood Tour (2015); NU Waves Tour (2016)

The Flood Tour was the fourth headlining concert tour by American alternative rock band The Neighbourhood, launched in support of their second studio album, Wiped Out!. Although the album would later receive its official release in 2015, the tour served as an early live showcase of new material while reinforcing the band's growing presence across the North American alternative and indie rock circuits.

The tour began on September 14, 2014, at the Sunshine Theater in Albuquerque, New Mexico, and concluded on October 30, 2014, at The Cosmopolitan of Las Vegas in Las Vegas, Nevada. Spanning 28 shows, The Flood Tour was limited exclusively to North America.

== Background ==
Following the commercial and critical momentum generated by their debut album I Love You. (2013), The Neighbourhood entered a transitional creative phase marked by darker sonic textures, atmospheric production, and introspective lyricism. Wiped Out! reflected this evolution, blending alternative rock, R&B influences, and ambient soundscapes.

The Flood Tour was conceived as a bridge between album cycles. Rather than waiting for the formal release of Wiped Out!, the band opted to preview unreleased tracks during intimate theater performances. This strategy not only cultivated anticipation among fans but also allowed the group to refine arrangements in a live setting before entering the next promotional phase.

Musically, the tour's setlists balanced established hits such as “Sweater Weather” and “Afraid” with early renditions of future album tracks including “R.I.P. 2 My Youth” and “The Beach.” The performances emphasized moody lighting, monochromatic stage design, and minimalist visuals consistent with the band's established black-and-white aesthetic.

== Critical and Fan Reception ==
Although The Flood Tour did not receive extensive mainstream press coverage compared to later tours, fan reception was notably strong. Concertgoers frequently cited the emotional intensity of the performances and the seamless integration of new material into the band's catalog.

Industry observers noted that the tour demonstrated The Neighbourhood's maturation as a live act. The group exhibited tighter musicianship and more cohesive stage production than on earlier tours, reflecting growing confidence and artistic direction.

== Setlist ==
1. "W.D.Y.W.F.M?"
2. "Let It Go"
3. "Wires"
4. "Prey"
5. "Baby Came Home"
6. "Afraid"
7. "Daddy Issues"
8. "Female Robbery"
9. "The Beach"
10. "Wiped Out!"
11. "Lurk"
12. "Jealou$y"
13. "Dangerous"
14. "When I Get Back"
15. "Icanteven"
16. "U&I"
17. "Warm"
18. "Sweater Weather"
19. "R.I.P. 2 My Youth"

== Shows ==
List of 2015 concerts
Date	City	Country	Venue	Opening act
North America
September 14, 2015	Albuquerque	United States	Sunshine Theater	Hunny; Bad Suns
September 15, 2015	Denver	United States	Ogden Theatre	Hunny; Bad Suns
September 17, 2015	Dallas	United States	Southside Ballroom	Hunny; Bad Suns
September 18, 2015	Austin	United States	Stubb's Waller Creek Amphitheatre	Hunny; Bad Suns
September 19, 2015	Houston	United States	Bayou Music Center	Hunny; Bad Suns
September 21, 2015	St. Petersburg	United States	Jannus Live	Hunny; Bad Suns
September 22, 2015	Miami	United States	The Fillmore Miami	Hunny; Bad Suns
September 23, 2015	Orlando	United States	House of Blues	Hunny; Bad Suns
September 25, 2015	Nashville	United States	Ryman Auditorium	Hunny; Bad Suns
September 26, 2015	Atlanta	United States	The Masquerade	Hunny; Bad Suns
September 28, 2015	Washington, D.C.	United States	9:30 Club	Hunny; Bad Suns
October 2, 2015	New York City	United States	Terminal 5	Hunny; Bad Suns
October 5, 2015	Boston	United States	House of Blues	Hunny; Bad Suns
October 6, 2015	Philadelphia	United States	Electric Factory	Hunny; Bad Suns
October 8, 2015	Montreal	Canada	Metropolis	Hunny; Bad Suns
October 9, 2015	Toronto	Canada	Danforth Music Hall	Hunny; Bad Suns
October 12, 2015	Pittsburgh	United States	Stage AE	Hunny; Bad Suns
October 13, 2015	Detroit	United States	The Fillmore Detroit	Hunny; Bad Suns
October 15, 2015	Chicago	United States	Aragon Ballroom	Hunny; Bad Suns
October 16, 2015	Minneapolis	United States	First Avenue	Hunny; Bad Suns
October 17, 2015	Winnipeg	Canada	The Garrick	Hunny; Bad Suns
October 20, 2015	Vancouver	Canada	Commodore	Hunny; Bad Suns
October 21, 2015	Seattle	United States	The Showbox	Hunny; Bad Suns
October 23, 2015	Portland	United States	Crystal Ballroom	Hunny; Bad Suns
October 24, 2015	Oakland	United States	Fox Oakland Theatre	Hunny; Bad Suns
October 27, 2015	San Diego	United States	House of Blues	Hunny; Bad Suns
October 29, 2015	Los Angeles	United States	Shrine Expo Hall	Hunny; Bad Suns
October 30, 2015	Las Vegas	United States	Cosmopolitan of Las Vegas	Hunny; Bad Suns
