= Zack Sekuler =

American filmmaker, director, and musician

Zack Sekuler is an American filmmaker, music video director, and musician. Notable music videos that he has directed include Sweater Weather (The Neighbourhood), Unsteady (X Ambassadors song), and Misery (Gwen Stefani song). He has directed and produced music videos for a variety of artists across different genres.

== Early life and education ==
Sekuler is from Thousand Oaks, California. He studied at the California Institute of the Arts where he obtained a Bachelor's degree. In high school, he was in a pop-punk band called "The Braces."

== Music Videos ==
Sekuler had been friends with Jesse Rutherford (singer) and other members of The Neighbourhood. He made the first video for the band, and then Sekuler and Daniel Iglesias Jr. teamed up to produce visual content for The Neighbourhood. In 2013, Sekuler co-directed Sweater Weather (The Neighbourhood Song). The pair also directed the black and white music video for Afraid (The Neighbourhood song). Complex noted: "Taking a stark, literally naked look at the band, it also goes a detour through a slowed-down, purple alternate reality (no idea what that could be about) and a Memento-like playthrough of its key sequences." The pair also co-directed the music video for Female Robbery.

Sekuler produced a bright-colored music video for Jesse Rutherford (singer)'s song called "Born to Be Blonde." He also produced 'Tunnelovision' for Rutherford.

In 2020, Sekuler directed a music video for EarthGang's "Options" featuring Wale (rapper). Pitchfork (website) called the video a "charming animated visual."

He directed "CVS" for Winnetka Bowling League. The video features Hilary Duff, Christopher Mintz-Plasse, and Elisha Yaffe and was filmed in Los Angeles. The video was filmed in an actual CVS pharmacy. He also directed on "On the 5" for the band.

Sekuler directed a music video for Kesha and Wrabel called "Since I Was Young." In the video, he reused video footage from their childhoods. Wrabel said of the video: "This video gave me goosebumps, made me cry, and prompted a late nite sappy mushy message to my family thanking them for loving me the way they do." Sekuler directed the lyric video for Louis the Child (DJs) and Wafia's song called “Better Not.” He also directed "The Village" for Wrabel.

In 2022, Sekuler directed a music video for Elton John and Stevie Wonder called "Finish Line." The video features video footage and images depicting life through the decades including the COVID-19 pandemic. The video highlights the joyous occasions of life as well as the challenges.
