= The Love Collection Tour =

2013 concert tour by The Neighbourhood

- Tour by The Neighbourhood
- Associated album: I Love You
- Start date: May 19, 2013
- End date: October 28, 2013
- No. of shows: 21
- Supporting act: The 1975

The Neighbourhood concert chronology
- The Drought Tour (2013); The Love Collection Tour (2013); El Tour Blanco (2014)

The Love Collection Tour was the second headlining concert tour by American alternative rock band The Neighbourhood, staged in 2013 in support of their debut studio album, I Love You. The tour marked a significant milestone in the band's early career, following the breakout success of their single “Sweater Weather” and the commercial performance of their first full-length record.

Spanning 21 shows across North America, the tour began on 19 May 2013 at the Shoreline Amphitheatre in Mountain View, California, and concluded on 28 October 2013 at the House of Blues in San Diego, California. It further established the band's dark, monochromatic aesthetic and cultivated a devoted fan base drawn to their moody fusion of alternative rock, R&B, and indie pop.

== Setlist ==
1. "How"
2. "Female Robbery"
3. "Everybody's Watching Me (Uh Oh)"
4. "Wires"
5. "Flawless"
6. "Let It Go"
7. "W.D.Y.W.F.M?"
8. "Baby Came Home"
9. "A Little Death"
10. "Say My Name"
11. "Cry Me a River"
12. "Afraid"
13. "Sweater Weather"
14. "Float"

== Tour dates ==
List of 2013 concerts
Date	City	Country	Venue	Opening act
May 19, 2013 (Note: Part of the 2013 Live 105 BFD)	Mountain View	United States	Shoreline Amphitheatre	—N/a
May 20, 2013	Sacramento	United States	Harlow's Restaurant & Nightclub	The 1975
May 24, 2013	Santa Ana	United States	The Observatory	The 1975
May 28, 2013	Tucson	United States	Club Congress	The 1975
June 1, 2013	Bonner Springs	United States	Cricket Wireless Amphitheater	The 1975
June 2, 2013	St Louis	United States	Blueberry Hill	The 1975
June 6, 2013	Dallas	United States	Trees Dallas	The 1975
June 7, 2013	Houston	United States	Fitzgerald's	The 1975
June 11, 2013	Orlando	United States	The Social	The 1975
June 15, 2013	Jacksonville	United States	Jack Rabbits	The 1975
June 26, 2013	Brooklyn	United States	Music Hall of Williamsburg	The 1975
June 29, 2013	New York City	United States	Bowery Ballroom	The 1975
July 2, 2013	Indianapolis	United States	Old National Centre	The 1975
July 3, 2013	Detroit	United States	The Shelter	The 1975
July 4, 2013 (Note: Part of the 2013 Summerfest)	Milwaukee	United States	Henry Maier Festival Park	—N/a
July 5, 2013	Minneapolis	United States	Varsity Theater	The 1975
July 8, 2013	Colorado Springs	United States	The Black Sheep	The 1975
July 9, 2013	Salt Lake City	United States	Kilby Court	The 1975
July 11, 2013	Vancouver	Canada	Venue	The 1975
July 12, 2013	Portland	United States	Wonder Ballroom	The 1975
October 28, 2013	San Diego	United States	House of Blues	The 1975
