= Jono Dorr =

American musician, singer, songwriter (born 1990)

- Born: Jonathan Jacob Dorr; April 1990 (age 36); Los Angeles, California, U.S.
- Genres: Pop; R&B
- Occupations: Musician; record producer; singer-songwriter
- Instruments: Vocals; piano; guitar; bass guitar
- Years active: 2009–present
- Website: www.jonodorr.com

Jonathan Jacob "Jono" Dorr (born April 1990) is an American singer, songwriter, multi-instrumentalist, and record producer. He has written and produced music for various artists and is most known for being a main collaborator with the billion-streaming band The Neighbourhood across their catalogue, from "Wiped Out!" to more recently co-producing and co-writing their album "Ultrasound" in its entirety.

== Early life ==
Jonathan Jacob Dorr was born in April 1990 in Los Angeles, California. He grew up playing guitar and explored many genres of music including classic rock, blues, and funk. Throughout his childhood, he played guitar and bass in various bands. While attending the Academy of Music and Performing Arts at Alexander Hamilton High School, Dorr participated in an electronic music class in which he learned how to create and produce music digitally. He then started producing and songwriting with various singers and rappers. Graduating from UC Santa Cruz with a major in Philosophy and a minor in Electronic Music, Dorr originally planned on becoming a lawyer to satisfy the wishes of his parents but instead opted for a career in music.

== Career ==
In 2015, Dorr co-produced The Neighbourhood's "Wiped Out!", finishing out the album at guitarist Zach Abel’s mother’s house. The album is certified gold and has 5 songs that have received gold and platinum certifications.

Throughout his career, he has also collaborated with various artists including Kehlani, Bibi Bourelly, Hayley Kiyoko, G-Eazy, Jesse Rutherford, French Montana, Quail P, Pardyalone, PawPaw Rod, Janine, and Ray Vaughn. He has also had success with composition and sync licensing with music placed in countless television shows across nearly every major network and streaming platform. In 2025, Dorr co-produced and co-wrote The Neighbourhood's fifth LP, "Ultrasound".
