= Wourld Tour II =

2027 concert tour by The Neighbourhood

- Tour by The Neighbourhood
- Location: North America; Latin America; Europe
- Associated album: Ultrasound
- Start date: February 28, 2027
- End date: July 17, 2027
- No. of shows: 29
- Producer: Live Nation

The Neighbourhood concert chronology
- Wourld Tour (2026); Wourld Tour II (2027)

The Wourld Tour II is an upcoming concert tour by American alternative rock band The Neighbourhood. It is scheduled to support the band's fifth studio album, Ultrasound, released in 2025. The tour is planned to begin on February 28, 2027, at Innings Festival in Tempe, Arizona, and conclude on July 17, 2027, at Lollapalooza in Berlin, Germany.

The tour is scheduled to consist of 29 shows across North America, Latin America and Europe. It is the band's eighth concert tour and its second tour primarily featuring arena performances. The tour is promoted and operated by Live Nation.

== Background ==
In 2025, The Neighbourhood released Ultrasound, the band's fifth studio album. The album marked the group's return with a new full-length project and provided the basis for its subsequent live performances. Material from Ultrasound was incorporated into the band's concerts alongside songs from its earlier albums.

During 2026, the band embarked on the Wourld Tour in support of Ultrasound. While the original tour was still underway, The Neighbourhood announced an additional series of concerts under the title Wourld Tour II. The second tour was presented as a continuation of the Wourld Tour rather than as an additional leg bearing the same title.

Wourld Tour II was announced through the band's social-media accounts on October 28, 2026. The announcement revealed dates across North America, Latin America and Europe, including appearances at festivals and concerts in arenas. Information concerning the tour, participating venues and ticket sales was also published through the band's official Instagram account and Live Nation's promotional channels.

The tour is produced and promoted by Live Nation. It is the eighth concert tour undertaken by The Neighbourhood and the band's second arena tour. The itinerary includes 29 scheduled performances in several cities and countries. Its geographical scope led to the tour being described as a world tour, although its announced dates are limited to the Americas and Europe.

== Tour Dates ==
List of concerts
Date	City	Country	Venue	Attendance	Revenue
February 28, 2027 (Note: Part of the Innings Festival)	Tempe	United States	Tempe Beach Park & Arts Par	—N/a	—N/a
March 2, 2027	Denver	United States	Ball Arena	—	—
March 4, 2027	St Louis	United States	Chaifetz Arena	—	—
March 6, 2027	Houston	United States	Toyota Center	—	—
March 7, 2027	Dallas	United States	American Airlines Center	—	—
March 12, 2027 (Note: Part of the Lollapalooza Argentina)	Buenos Aires	Argentina	Hipódromo de San Isidro	—N/a	—N/a
March 13, 2027 (Note: Part of the Lollapalooza Chile)	Santiago	Chile	O'Higgins Park	—N/a	—N/a
March 19, 2027 (Note: Part of the Festival Estéreo Picnic)	Bogotá	Colombia	Simón Bolívar Park	—N/a	—N/a
March 21, 2027 (Note: Part of the Lollapalooza Brazil)	São Paulo	Brazil	Interlagos Circuit	—N/a	—N/a
April 23, 2027	Philadelphia	United States	Xfinity Mobile Arena	—	—
April 24, 2027	Boston	United States	TD Garden	—	—
April 27, 2027	Montreal	Canada	Bell Centre	—	—
April 28, 2027	Ottawa	Canada	Canadian Tire Centre	—	—
April 30, 2027	Columbus	United States	Schottenstein Center	—	—
May 1, 2027	Pittsburgh	United States	PPG Paints Arena	—	—
May 5, 2027	Raleigh	United States	Lenovo Center	—	—
May 7, 2027	Indianapolis	United States	Gainbridge Fieldhouse	—	—
May 8, 2027	Chicago	United States	United Center	—	—
May 11, 2027	Winnipeg	Canada	Canada Life Centre	—	—
May 14, 2027	Calgary	Canada	Scotiabank Saddledome	—	—
May 15, 2027	Edmonton	Canada	Rogers Place	—	—
June 20, 2027 (Note: Part of the Pinkpop Festival)	Landgraaf	Netherlands	Megaland	—N/a	—N/a
June 23, 2027	Sofia	Bulgaria	Sofia Live Park	—N/a	—N/a
June 25, 2027 (Note: Part of the Release Athens Music Festival)	Athens	Greece	Markopoulo Complex	—N/a	—N/a
July 2, 2027 (Note: Part of the Open'er Festival)	Gdynia	Poland	Gdynia-Kosakowo Airport	—N/a	—N/a
July 5, 2027 (Note: Part of the Luxexpo Open-Air)	Luxembourg City		Luxexpo The Box	—N/a	—N/a
July 8, 2027 (Note: Part of the NOS Alive)	Lisbon	Portugal	Passeio Marítimo de Algés	—N/a	—N/a
July 13, 2027	Florence	Italy	Parco delle Cascine	—N/a	—N/a
July 15, 2027 (Note: Part of the Metastadt Open Air)	Vienna	Austria	Dr.-Otto-Neurath-Gasse	—N/a	—N/a
July 17, 2027 (Note: Part of the Lollapalooza)	Berlin	Germany	Olympiapark Berlin		
