= Softcore (song) =

Song by The Neighbourhood

from the album the Neighbourhood
- Released: March 9, 2018
- Recorded: 2017
- Studio: Lankershim (Los Angeles, CA)
- Genre: Electropop; synthwave
- Length: 3:30
- Label: Columbia; Sony Music
- Songwriters: Jesse Rutherford; Brandon Fried; Jeremiah Freedman; Zachary Abels; Michael Margott; Lars Stalfors
- Producer: Lars Stalfors

"Softcore" is a song by American alternative band the Neighbourhood from their third studio album The Neighbourhood. It was written in 2017 by the band members Jesse Rutherford, Brandon Fried, Jeremiah Freedman, Zachary Abels and Michael Margott with producer Lars Stalfors. The latter also handled mixing, programming, drum programming and synthesising duties, while Dave Cerminara engineered it at Lankershim in Los Angeles.

Despite never being released as a single, the song received positive reviews from music critics, and has managed to chart worldwide after a resurgence in popularity in 2022, landing at number 65 on the Billboard Global 200 and becoming a sleeper hit, and among some of the band's most popular songs, alongside "Sweater Weather" and "Daddy Issues". It managed to reach the Top 40 in Finland, Greece, Czech Republic, Slovakia, Norway, Austria and Switzerland. It was certified Platinum by the Recording Industry Association of America, IFPI Greece and British Phonographic Industry, and Gold by Bundesverband Musikindustrie and Federazione Industria Musicale Italiana.

The song was included in Bravo magazine compilation album Bravo Hits 116, which was released on February 11, 2022.

== Track listing ==
No.	Title	Writer(s)	Producer(s)	Length
1.	"Softcore"	Jesse James Rutherford; Zachary Abels; Jeremiah Freedman; Brandon Fried; Michael Margott; Lars Stalfors	Lars Stalfors	3:30
Total length:				3:30

== Personnel ==
The Neighbourhood

- Jesse Rutherford – vocals, songwriter
- Zachary Abels – guitar, songwriter
- Jeremiah Freedman – guitar, songwriter
- Brandon Fried – drums, songwriter
- Michael Margott – bass guitar, songwriter

Technical personnel

- Lars Stalfors – producer, songwriter, programming, drum programming, synth, mixing
- Dave Cerminara – engineering

== Charts ==
Chart (2018–2024)	Peak position
Austria (Ö3 Austria Top 40)	32
Czech Republic (Singles Digitál Top 100)	23
Finland (Suomen virallinen lista)	7
France (SNEP)	191
Germany (GfK)	45
Global 200 (Billboard)	65
Greece International (IFPI)	11
Ireland (IRMA)	78
Lithuania (AGATA)	6
Netherlands (Single Top 100)	78
Norway (VG-lista)	29
Poland (Polish Streaming Top 100)	96
Portugal (AFP)	79
Slovakia (Singles Digitál Top 100)	24
Sweden (Sverigetopplistan)	54
Switzerland (Schweizer Hitparade)	33
UK Singles (Official Charts)	51
US Rock Streaming Songs (Billboard)	10

== Certifications ==
Certifications for "Softcore"
Region	Certification	Certified units/sales
Australia (ARIA)	3× Platinum	210,000^{‡}
Brazil (Pro-Música Brasil)	2× Diamond	320,000^{‡}
Canada (Music Canada)	2× Platinum	160,000^{‡}
Denmark (IFPI Danmark)	Gold	45,000^{‡}
France (SNEP)	Diamond	333,333^{‡}
Germany (BVMI)	Gold	200,000^{‡}
Italy (FIMI)	Gold	50,000^{‡}
Mexico (AMPROFON)	4× Platinum+Gold	270,000^{‡}
New Zealand (RMNZ)	2× Platinum	60,000^{‡}
Poland (ZPAV)	2× Platinum	100,000^{‡}
Spain (Promusicae)	Gold	30,000^{‡}
United Kingdom (BPI)	Platinum	600,000^{‡}
United States (RIAA)	3× Platinum	3,000,000^{‡}
Streaming
Greece (IFPI Greece)	3× Platinum	6,000,000^{†}
^{‡} Sales+streaming figures based on certification alone.^{†} Streaming-only figures based on certification alone.
