= I'm Sorry... =

EP by The Neighbourhood
- Released: May 7, 2012
- Genre: Indie rock
- Length: 17:51
- Label: Columbia
- Producers: Emile Haynie; Justyn Pilbrow

The Neighbourhood chronology
I'm Sorry... (2012)	Thank You, (2012)

Singles from I'm Sorry...
- 1. "Female Robbery" Released: October 8, 2012; 2. "Sweater Weather" Released: December 3, 2012

I'm Sorry... is the debut extended play (EP) by American alternative rock band The Neighbourhood. It was released by Columbia Records on May 7, 2012. An indie rock EP, it was produced by Emile Haynie and Justyn Pilbrow, and was supported by two singles: "Female Robbery" and "Sweater Weather".

I'm Sorry... received generally positive reviews from music critics, who believed the band to have potential, although some felt it lacked a standout, defining moment. The song "Sweater Weather" experienced a resurgence in popularity in mid-to-late 2020 due to its use on the social media platform TikTok.

== Background and promotion ==
The Neighbourhood was formed in August 2011 by the singer Jesse Rutherford, guitarists Zachary Abels and Jeremiah Freedman, bassist Michael Margott, and drummer Bryan "Olivver" Sammis. The members of the Neighbourhood chose the British spelling of "neighbourhood" on the advice of their manager, to distinguish themselves from a band already using the American spelling.

I'm Sorry...'s first single, "Female Robbery", was released on October 8, 2012. Its second and final single, "Sweater Weather", was sent to modern rock radio on December 3, 2012.

== Critical reception ==
Professional ratings
Review scores
Source	Rating
AllMusic	3.5/5 stars
Female First	4/5

Mike Diver of BBC Music called I'm Sorry... "a presentable taster for a band who may well expand their palette in fascinating ways in 2013, but it lacks one true moment of standalone magic". Brandon of The Burning Ear said the rest of it "doesn't feel as strong". Jake Blair of Earmilk noted that listening to both "Female Robbery" and "Sweater Weather" "feels a bit like watching a high-school basketball star run circles around the competition", additionally adding that the band's talent "is both distinct and obvious and ready to be refined at the next level". Helen Earnshaw of Female First said the band "look set for great things and if they continue making music like this they will find that success coming very quickly".

== Track listing ==
Credits are adapted from Tidal.

No.	Title	Lyrics	Music	Producer(s)	Length
1.	"Female Robbery"	Jesse Rutherford	Jeremiah Freedman; Rutherford; Zachary Abels	Emile Haynie; Justyn Pilbrow	3:29
2.	"Leaving Tonight"	Freedman; Rutherford; Abels	Freedman; Rutherford; Abels	Pilbrow	3:23
3.	"Baby Came Home"	Freedman; Rutherford; Abels	Freedman; Rutherford; Abels	Pilbrow	3:46
4.	"Sweater Weather"	Rutherford	Freedman; Rutherford; Abels	Pilbrow	4:00
5.	"Wires"	Freedman; Rutherford; Abels	Freedman; Rutherford; Abels	Pilbrow	3:13
Total length:					17:51

== Credits and personnel ==
Credits are adapted from Tidal.

- Emile Haynie – producer (1), mixing engineer (1)
- Justyn Pilbrow – producer (all tracks), mixing engineer (2, 3, 5)
- Chris Mullings – engineer (all tracks), mixing engineer (2, 3, 5)
- Craig Silvey – mixing engineer (4)
- Tony Mantz – mastering engineer (all tracks)
- Jesse Rutherford – composer (all tracks), lyricist (all tracks)
- Jeremiah Freedman – composer (all tracks), lyricist (2, 3, 5)
- Zachary Abels – composer (all tracks), lyricist (2, 3, 5)

== Charts ==
Chart performance
Chart (2013)	Peak position
US Heatseekers Albums (Billboard)	11

== Certifications ==
Certifications
Region	Certification	Certified units/sales
Canada (Music Canada)	Gold	40,000^{‡}
^{‡} Sales+streaming figures based on certification alone.
