= Wiped Out =

Wiped Out may refer to:

- Wiped Out (Raven album), 1982
- Wiped Out!, an album by The Neighbourhood, 2015
- "Wiped Out", a song by Ace Frehley and Kiss from Ace Frehley, 1978
- "Wiped Out", a song by The Damned from Phantasmagoria, 1985
- Wiped Out, children's book by Tempany Deckert, 2007
