= Wourld Tour =

2026 concert tour by The Neighbourhood

- Tour by The Neighbourhood
- Location: Asia; Europe; North America; Oceania
- Associated album: Ultrasound
- Start date: March 28, 2026
- End date: December 4, 2026
- Legs: 6
- No. of shows: 62
- Producer: Live Nation

The Neighbourhood concert chronology
- The Middle of Somewhere Tour (2019); Wourld Tour (2026); Wourld Tour II (2027)

The Wourld Tour is a ongoing seventh concert tour and first arena scale world tour by American alternative rock band The Neighbourhood. The tour supports their fifth studio album, Ultrasound (2025).

Beginning on March 28, 2026, at the Moody Center in Austin, Texas, the tour is scheduled to conclude on December 4, 2026, at the Kia Forum in Inglewood, California. Spanning North America, Europe, Asia, and Oceania, the tour comprises 61 shows and marks the band's most extensive global run to date.

== Tour dates ==
List of 2026 concerts
Date	City	Country	Venue	Opening act
March 28, 2026	Austin	United States	Moody Center	Neggy Gemmy; Noise Dept.
March 31, 2026	Fort Worth	United States	Dickies Arena	Neggy Gemmy; Noise Dept.
April 2, 2026	Minneapolis	United States	Minneapolis Armory	Neggy Gemmy; Noise Dept.
April 6, 2026	Toronto	Canada	Scotiabank Arena	Neggy Gemmy; Noise Dept.
April 8, 2026	Boston	United States	TD Garden	Neggy Gemmy; Noise Dept.
April 10, 2026	Washington, D.C.	United States	The Anthem	Neggy Gemmy; Noise Dept.
April 11, 2026	Washington, D.C.	United States	The Anthem	Neggy Gemmy; Noise Dept.
April 14, 2026	New York City	United States	Madison Square Garden	Neggy Gemmy; Noise Dept.
April 26, 2026	Istanbul	Turkey	Maçka Küçükçiftlik Park	Neggy Gemmy; Noise Dept.
April 27, 2026	Istanbul	Turkey	Maçka Küçükçiftlik Park	Neggy Gemmy; Noise Dept.
April 30, 2026	Prague	Czechia	Sportovní hala Fortuna	Neggy Gemmy; Noise Dept.
May 1, 2026	Prague	Czechia	Sportovní hala Fortuna	Neggy Gemmy; Noise Dept.
May 2, 2026	Kraków	Poland	Tauron Arena Kraków	Neggy Gemmy; Noise Dept.
May 4, 2026	Assago	Italy	Unipol Forum	Neggy Gemmy; Noise Dept.
May 5, 2026	Zurich	Switzerland	Hallenstadion	Neggy Gemmy; Noise Dept.
May 7, 2026	Berlin	Germany	Velodrom	Neggy Gemmy; Noise Dept.
May 8, 2026	Amsterdam	Netherlands	Ziggo Dome	Neggy Gemmy; Noise Dept.
May 10, 2026	Cologne	Germany	Lanxess Arena	Neggy Gemmy; Noise Dept.
May 12, 2026	Paris	France	Zénith Paris	Neggy Gemmy; Noise Dept.
May 13, 2026	Merksem (Note: Labeled as Antwerp in promotional material)	Belgium	AFAS Dome	Neggy Gemmy; Noise Dept.
May 15, 2026	London	England	The O_{2} Arena	Neggy Gemmy; Noise Dept.
May 17, 2026	Dublin	Ireland	3Arena	Neggy Gemmy; Noise Dept.
June 13, 2026 (Note: Part of the 2026 Bonnaroo)	Manchester	United States	Great Stage Park	—N/a
June 30, 2026	Honolulu	Hawaii	Neal S. Blaisdell Center	Noisedept.
July 4, 2026	Auckland	New Zealand	Spark Arena	Noisedept.
July 7, 2026	Sydney	Australia	Hordern Pavilion	Noisedept.
July 8, 2026	Sydney	Australia	Hordern Pavilion	Noisedept.
July 10, 2026	Melbourne	Australia	Margaret Court Arena	Noisedept.
July 11, 2026	Melbourne	Australia	Margaret Court Arena	Noisedept.
July 14, 2026	Singapore		The Star Theatre	Noisedept.
July 16, 2026	Kuala Lumpur	Malaysia	Mega Star Arena	Noisedept.
July 18, 2026	Jakarta	Indonesia	Istora Gelora Bung Karno	Noisedept.
July 20, 2026	Seoul	South Korea	YES24 Live Hall	Noisedept.
July 20, 2026 (Note: Part of the 2026 Osheaga Festival)	Montreal	Canada	Jean-Drapeau Park	—N/a
August 24, 2026	Stockholm	Sweden	Avicii Arena	Noise Dept. Nessa Barrett
August 25, 2026	Bærum (Note: Labeled as Oslo in promotional material)	Norway	Unity Arena	Noise Dept. Nessa Barrett
August 27, 2026	Copenhagen	Denmark	Royal Arena	Noise Dept. Nessa Barrett
August 29, 2026	Hamburg	Germany	Barclays Arena	Noise Dept. Nessa Barrett
August 30, 2026	Cologne	Germany	Lanxess Arena	Noise Dept. Nessa Barrett
September 1, 2026	Manchester	England	Co-op Live	Noise Dept. Nessa Barrett
September 2, 2026	Glasgow	Scotland	OVO Hydro	Noise Dept. Nessa Barrett
September 4, 2026	London	England	Wembley Arena	Noise Dept. Nessa Barrett
September 8, 2026	Paris	France	Accor Arena	Noise Dept. Nessa Barrett
September 10, 2026	Madrid	Spain	Palacio Vistalegre	Noise Dept. Nessa Barrett
September 12, 2026	Lisbon	Portugal	MEO Arena	Noise Dept. Nessa Barrett
September 21, 2026	Zapopan	Mexico	Telmex Auditorium	Noise Dept. After
September 23, 2026	Monterrey	Mexico	Auditorio Banamex	Noise Dept. After
September 25, 2026	Mexico City	Mexico	Palacio de los Deportes	Noise Dept. After
September 26, 2026	Mexico City	Mexico	Palacio de los Deportes	Noise Dept. After
October 2, 2026	Vancouver	Canada	Rogers Arena	Noise Dept. After
October 3, 2026	Seattle	United States	WaMu Theater	Noise Dept. After
October 5, 2026	Portland	United States	Moda Center	Noise Dept. After
October 7, 2026	San Francisco	United States	Bill Graham Civic Auditorium	Noise Dept. After
October 9, 2026	Inglewood	United States	Kia Forum	Noise Dept. After
November 10, 2026	Atlanta	United States	State Farm Arena	Noise Dept. Nessa Barrett
November 11, 2026	Orlando	United States	Kia Center	Noise Dept. Nessa Barrett
November 12, 2026	Miami	United States	Kaseya Center	Noise Dept. Nessa Barrett
November 16, 2026	Kansas City	United States	T-Mobile Center	Noise Dept. Nessa Barrett
November 19, 2026	Detroit	United States	Little Caesars Arena	Noise Dept. Nessa Barrett
November 21, 2026	Brooklyn	United States	Barclays Center	Noise Dept. Nessa Barrett
November 30, 2026	Phoenix	United States	Mortgage Matchup Center	Noise Dept. Nessa Barrett
December 2, 2026	San Francisco	United States	Bill Graham Civic Auditorium	Noise Dept. Nessa Barrett
December 4, 2026	Inglewood	United States	Kia Forum	Noise Dept. Nessa Barrett
