= NBHD =

NBHD may refer to:

- Namco Bandai Holdings, a Japanese holding company
- an abbreviation for neighborhood
- common rendering of The Neighbourhood, an American alternative rock band formed in 2011.
