= Lars Stalfors =

American record producer

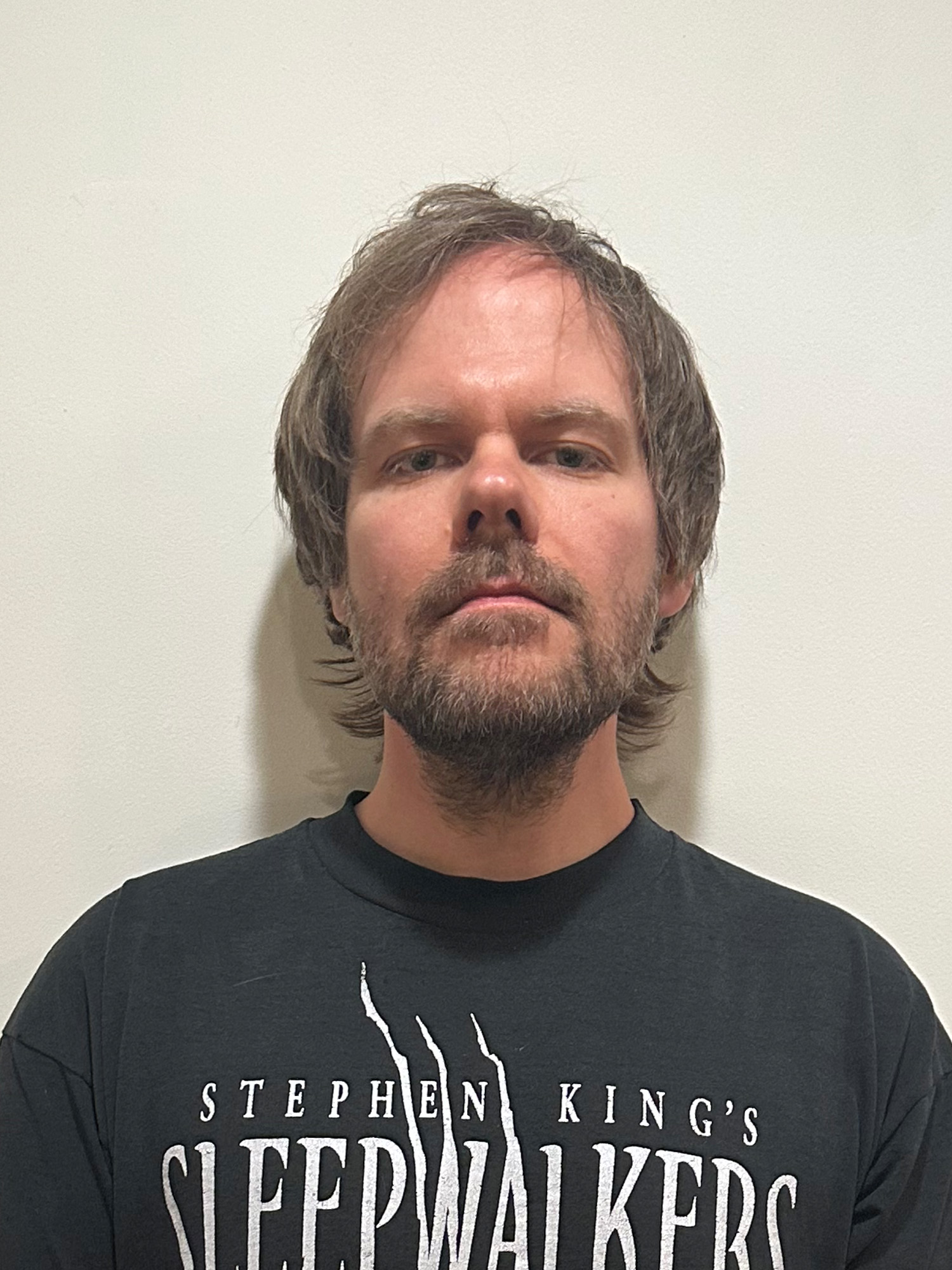
- Stalfors in 2024

Background information
- Born: Lars Erik Stalfors; September 1982 (age 43)
- Origin: California, U.S.
- Genres: Alternative; rock; hip hop
- Occupations: Record producer; songwriter; mixer

Lars Stalfors is an American record producer, mixer, and audio engineer based in Los Angeles, California.

Stalfors began his career as a touring member and engineer for the progressive rock band the Mars Volta in the 2000s. Since then, he has worked with many popular artists and songs as a mixer and engineer, including "Sit Next to Me" by Foster the People, which earned Platinum certification and charted high on the Billboard Hot 100. He also produced and mixed the song "First" by Cold War Kids, which received a Platinum certification from the RIAA, and mixed the Gold record Come Over When You're Sober, Pt. 1 by Lil Peep.

In addition to his engineering and mixing work, Stalfors produced the Grammy Award-winning song "Masseduction" by St. Vincent, which won the Grammy Award for Best Rock Song in 2019. Stalfors has also produced and mixed the Neighbourhood record "Hard to Imagine The Neighbourhood Ever Changing", which includes the hit song "Softcore". The track has been certified Platinum by the Recording Industry Association of America.

== Selected discography ==
Year	Album	Artist	Credit
2026	Selling a Vibe	The Cribs	Mixer
2025	Sword (single)	Wisp	Mixer
2021	Ride the Lightning (717 Tapes) (single)	Warren Zeiders	Mixer
2018	Sit Next to Me (Stereotypes Rem.)	Foster the People	Mixer
2018	Without Love (Single)	Alice Glass	Producer, Songwriter
2012	Noctourniquet	The Mars Volta	Mixer, engineer
2009	Cryptomnesia	El Grupo Nuevo de Omar Rodriguez Lopez	Engineer
2009	Octahedron	The Mars Volta	Engineer
2008	The Bedlam in Goliath	The Mars Volta	Engineer
