= Daddy Issues (The Neighbourhood song) =

Single by the Neighbourhood

from the album Wiped Out!
- Released: May 5, 2016
- Genre: Psychedelic rock alternative rock slow rock
- Length: 4:20
- Label: Columbia
- Songwriter: Jesse Rutherford
- Producer: Justyn Pilbrow

The Neighbourhood singles chronology
"R.I.P. 2 My Youth" (2015)	"Daddy Issues" (2016)	"Cry Baby" (2016)

Music video
- "Daddy Issues" on YouTube

"Daddy Issues" is a song by American alternative rock band the Neighbourhood. It was released through Columbia Records on May 5, 2016, as the second single from their second studio album, Wiped Out! (2015). The track was written by band members Jesse Rutherford, Zachary Abels, and Jeremiah Freedman, with production handled by Justyn Pilbrow.

The song was well received by critics, who complimented its moody production, Rutherford's vocals and exploration of dark themes, and achieved moderate success upon its initial release, appearing on the Billboard Hot Rock & Alternative Songs chart. However, it experienced a significant commercial resurgence in 2020 and 2021 after gaining viral traction on the social media platform TikTok. This renewed interest led to the song entering several international charts for the first time and receiving platinum certifications from the Recording Industry Association of America (RIAA) and the British Phonographic Industry (BPI).

== Background and release ==
The development of "Daddy Issues" occurred during the recording sessions for the Neighbourhood's second studio album, Wiped Out! (2015). Following the global commercial success of their debut album, I Love You., and its lead single "Sweater Weather", the band sought to evolve their sonic identity by incorporating more electronic and R&B elements. The song was written by lead vocalist Jesse Rutherford alongside guitarists Zachary Abels and Jeremiah Freedman. Production was handled by Justyn Pilbrow, who had worked extensively with the band on their previous discography.

Lyrically, the song is deeply rooted in the personal history of Jesse Rutherford, specifically addressing the psychological impact of his father's death during his childhood. Rutherford has noted in interviews that the song explores the projection of childhood trauma onto adult romantic relationships. The track was officially released as the second single from the album on May 5, 2016, through Columbia Records.

== Composition ==
"Daddy Issues" is a mid-tempo track with a duration of four minutes and twenty seconds. According to the sheet music published by Sony/ATV Music Publishing at Musicnotes.com, the song is composed in the key of G♯ minor with a tempo of 85 beats per minute. The vocal range for Jesse Rutherford spans from a low note of F♯3 to a high note of G♯5.

The song's production is defined by its "washed-out" and atmospheric aesthetic, utilizing heavy reverb-drenched guitar layers syncopated drum machine patterns, and prominent synthesizers. This marked a departure from the band's earlier indie-rock sound, leaning instead into synth-pop and alternative R&B. The arrangement features a minimalist verse structure that builds into a more melodic and layered chorus, emphasizing the emotional weight of the lyrical themes.

== Critical reception ==
The song received generally positive reviews from music critics. Many reviewers highlighted "Daddy Issues" as a centerpiece of the Wiped Out! album cycle. Mumford Gilly of The Guardian described the track as a "polished, moody pop" effort that successfully blended urban influences with alternative rock.

NME noted that the track demonstrated the band's growth and maturity, praising the production's "atmospheric and melancholic" quality. While some reviewers for the parent album were critical of the record's length, "Daddy Issues" was frequently cited as a standout for its vulnerable vocal performance and cohesive sound.

== Commercial performance ==
During its initial release, the song peaked at number 37 on the Billboard Hot Rock Songs chart. However, the song experienced an unprecedented commercial resurgence between 2020 and 2022 due to viral usage on the social media platform TikTok. This resurgence led to the song entering several international charts for the first time.

In the United Kingdom, the song was certified Platinum by the British Phonographic Industry (BPI). As of 2025, the song has been certified 5× Platinum by the Recording Industry Association of America (RIAA), denoting five million units in the United States.

== Live performances ==
The Neighbourhood debuted "Daddy Issues" live during the promotional tour for Wiped Out! in late 2015. One of the song's most significant early performances occurred during the band's set at the 2016 Coachella Valley Music and Arts Festival. Performed on the Samsung Stage, the rendition was noted for its adherence to the band's strict monochromatic aesthetic, featuring high-contrast black-and-white stage lighting and visual projections that mirrored the track's atmospheric production.

In June 2016, the band performed the song during an outdoor session for Jimmy Kimmel Live!, which helped solidify the track's presence on alternative radio. Critics noted that the live arrangement placed a heavier emphasis on the syncopated bassline and Brandon Fried's live drumming, providing a more aggressive energy compared to the studio version's programmed percussion.

Following the song's commercial resurgence in 2020, "Daddy Issues" became the penultimate track in the band's setlists during their 2021 global tour. For these performances, the band introduced an extended bridge and an experimental synthesizer outro. During their performance at Hollywood Bowl in 2021, the song was accompanied by stylized lyric videos projected onto the proscenium, reflecting its status as a viral digital hit. Live recordings of the song have frequently appeared on the band's social media platforms, with fans noting the increased emotional intensity of Jesse Rutherford's vocal delivery in later years.

== Music video ==
The official music video for "Daddy Issues" was released on May 5, 2016, and was directed by Jack Begert. Filmed entirely in black and white, the visual maintains the monochromatic aesthetic for which the band was known during their early years.

== Remix ==
On January 27, 2017, an official remix of "Daddy Issues" was released featuring American singer-songwriter Syd, known as a member of the neo-soul collective The Internet. The remix maintains the original's atmospheric production but adds a guest verse and vocal harmonies from Syd, which critics noted added a new perspective and melodic depth to the song's narrative structure.

== Personnel ==
Credits adapted from the liner notes of Wiped Out!.

The Neighbourhood

- Jesse Rutherford – lead vocals
- Zachary Abels – lead guitar
- Jeremiah Freedman – rhythm guitar
- Michael Margott – bass guitar
- Brandon Fried – drums

Technical personnel

- Justyn Pilbrow – production, engineering
- Emily Lazar – mastering
- Chris Galland – mixing

== Charts ==
=== Weekly charts ===
2015 weekly chart performance
Chart (2015)	Peak position
US Hot Rock & Alternative Songs (Billboard)	37

2021–2026 weekly chart performance
Chart (2021–2026)	Peak position
Greece International (IFPI)	30
Lithuania (AGATA)	27
Portugal (AFP)	110
Slovakia Singles Digital (ČNS IFPI)	91

=== Year-end charts ===
2021 year-end chart performance
Chart (2021)	Position
Portugal (AFP)	144

2022 year-end chart performance
Chart (2022)	Position
Portugal (AFP)	145

== Certifications ==
Certifications
Region	Certification	Certified units/sales
Australia (ARIA)	4× Platinum	280,000^{‡}
Brazil (Pro-Música Brasil)	2× Diamond	500,000^{‡}
Canada (Music Canada)	3× Platinum	240,000^{‡}
Denmark (IFPI Danmark)	Platinum	90,000^{‡}
France (SNEP)	Platinum	200,000^{‡}
Germany (BVMI)	Gold	200,000^{‡}
Italy (FIMI)	Gold	50,000^{‡}
Mexico (AMPROFON)	Diamond+3× Platinum+Gold	510,000^{‡}
New Zealand (RMNZ)	3× Platinum	90,000^{‡}
Poland (ZPAV)	4× Platinum	200,000^{‡}
Portugal (AFP)	2× Platinum	40,000^{‡}
Spain (Promusicae)	Platinum	60,000^{‡}
United Kingdom (BPI)	Platinum	600,000^{‡}
United States (RIAA)	5× Platinum	5,000,000^{‡}
Streaming
Greece (IFPI Greece)	Platinum	2,000,000^{†}
^{‡} Sales+streaming figures based on certification alone.^{†} Streaming-only figures based on certification alone.
