= Chip Chrome & the Mono-Tones =

2020 album by the Neighbourhood

Studio album by the Neighbourhood
- Released: September 25, 2020
- Length: 31:41
- Label: Columbia
- Producers: Danny Parra; The Neighbourhood

The Neighbourhood chronology
Ever Changing (2018)	Chip Chrome & the Mono-Tones (2020)	Ultrasound (2025)

Singles from The Neighbourhood
- 1. "Cherry Flavoured" Released: July 31, 2020; 2. "Lost in Translation" Released: September 24, 2020

Professional ratings
Review scores
Source	Rating
AllMusic	4.5/5 stars

Chip Chrome & the Mono-Tones is the fourth studio album by American rock band the Neighbourhood. It was released on September 25, 2020 by Columbia Records.

== Background ==
Heavily inspired by the story and the style of David Bowie's alter ego Ziggy Stardust and his band The Spiders from Mars, Chip Chrome & the Mono-Tones is a concept album built on vocalist Jesse Rutherford's struggles with binge-using social media and the band's identity.

The first single, "Cherry Flavoured", was released on July 31, 2020. An EP featuring four tracks from Chip Chrome & the Mono-Tones, Pretty Boy was released on September 9, 2020. The album's first single, "Lost in Translation", followed on September 24, the day before the release of the album.

The deluxe version, released on December 11, 2020, includes four more songs that serve as a prelude to the original material. A music video for "Stargazing" was released on December 14, 2020.

== Track listing ==
Chip Chrome & the Mono-Tones – Standard edition
No.	Title	Length
1.	"Chip Chrome"	0:31
2.	"Pretty Boy"	3:54
3.	"Lost in Translation"	3:10
4.	"Devil's Advocate"	3:06
5.	"Hell or High Water"	2:20
6.	"Cherry Flavoured"	3:28
7.	"The Mono-Tones"	1:14
8.	"BooHoo"	3:11
9.	"Silver Lining"	2:59
10.	"Tobacco Sunburst"	4:57
11.	"Middle of Somewhere"	2:51
Total length:		31:41

Chip Chrome & the Mono-Tones – Deluxe edition additional tracks
No.	Title	Length
1.	"Stargazing"	3:37
2.	"Over the Influence"	3:40
3.	"Here We Go Again"	4:17
4.	"The Shining"	3:34
Total length:		46:49

== Certifications ==
Certifications for Chip Chrome & the Mono-Tones
Region	Certification	Certified units/sales
Mexico (AMPROFON)	Gold	30,000^{‡}
^{‡} Sales+streaming figures based on certification alone.
