= Ultrasound (album) =

Studio album by the Neighbourhood
- Released: November 14, 2025
- Recorded: November 2024 – 2025
- Length: 57:04
- Label: Warner
- Producer: Jono Dorr

The Neighbourhood chronology
| Chip Chrome & the Mono-Tones (2020) | Ultrasound (2025) |

Singles from Ultrasound
- 1. "Private" Released: October 23, 2025; 2. "OMG" Released: October 23, 2025; 3. "Lovebomb" Released: October 23, 2025; 4. "Hula Girl" Released: November 14, 2025

Ultrasound (stylized as (((((ultraSOUND)))))) is the fifth studio album by American rock band the Neighbourhood. It was released on November 14, 2025, by Warner Records.

== Background ==
In February 2022, the Neighbourhood announced that they would take a hiatus. On November 13, 2022, the band announced on social media that drummer Brandon Fried would no longer be in the Neighbourhood after María Zardoya of the Marías accused him of sexual assault.

In August 2025, the official Instagram account of the Neighbourhood posted a story, which indicated that they would return to creating music and releasing it. Additionally, they announced drummer Brandon Fried would return to the band.

On October 23, 2025, the band released three songs, "OMG", "Lovebomb", and "Private", as the lead singles from their fifth studio album Ultrasound.

On January 16, 2026, the band announced the deluxe version of the album, called Ultrasound+, including five new songs and releasing on February 20, 2026.

== Track listing ==
All tracks are written by Zachary Abels, Jeremiah Freedman, Brandon Fried, Michael Margott, Jesse Rutherford, and Jonathan Jacob Dorr, with additional writers noted.

Ultrasound track listing
| No. | Title | Writer(s) | Length |
|---|---|---|---|
| 1. | "Hula Girl" | | 4:04 |
| 2. | "OMG" | | 3:02 |
| 3. | "Lovebomb" | | 3:20 |
| 4. | "Private" | | 3:49 |
| 5. | "Lil Ol Me" | | 3:27 |
| 6. | "Planet" | | 4:01 |
| 7. | "Holy Ghost" | Justyn Pilbrow; Daniel Parra | 4:29 |
| 8. | "Rabbit" | | 4:59 |
| 9. | "Tides" | Pilbrow | 4:16 |
| 10. | "Daisy Chain" | | 3:26 |
| 11. | "Zombie" | | 3:13 |
| 12. | "Mama Drama" | Pilbrow | 3:50 |
| 13. | "Crushed" | | 3:17 |
| 14. | "Mute" | | 3:11 |
| 15. | "Stupid Boy" | Pilbrow; Parra | 4:32 |
| Total length: | | | 57:04 |

Ultrasound+ Deluxe track listing
| No. | Title | Writer(s) | Length |
|---|---|---|---|
| 16. | "Start" | | 2:39 |
| 17. | "Good Grief" | | 4:21 |
| 18. | "Lulu" | | 3:40 |
| 19. | "Red Flag" | Gavin Bennett; Ari Starace | 3:11 |
| 20. | "Bed" | | 2:28 |
| Total length: | | | 1:13:13 |

== Personnel ==
Credits adapted from Tidal and Rolling Stone.

=== The Neighbourhood ===
- Zachary Abels – guitars
- Jeremiah Freedman – guitars
- Brandon Fried – drums
- Michael Margott – bass
- Jesse Rutherford – vocals

=== Additional contributors ===
- Jono Dorr – production, engineering (all tracks); background vocals (1–12, 14), electric guitar (2, 13), programming (3–7, 12, 15), keyboards (3, 4, 6, 7), bass (3, 6)
- Justyn Pilbrow – production (8, 15), additional production (9)
- Danny Parra – additional production (8, 15)
- Sean "Dweez" Dwyer – engineering
- Mark "Spike" Stent – mixing
- Kieran Beardmore – mixing assistance
- Dale Becker – mastering
- Gavin Bennett – writer, co-producer (19)
- Y2K – writer, co-producer (19)

== Charts ==
Chart performance for Ultrasound
| Chart (2025–2026) | Peak position |
|---|---|
| Australian Albums (ARIA) | 49 |
| Belgian Albums (Ultratop Flanders) | 157 |
| Belgian Albums (Ultratop Wallonia) | 197 |
| Dutch Vinyl Albums (Dutch Charts) | 27 |
| French Rock & Metal Albums (SNEP) | 48 |
| Lithuanian Albums (AGATA) | 27 |
| New Zealand Albums (RMNZ) | 35 |
| Polish Albums (ZPAV) | 68 |
| Portuguese Albums (AFP) | 62 |
| Swiss Albums (Schweizer Hitparade) | 31 |
| US Billboard 200 | 155 |
| US Top Rock & Alternative Albums (Billboard) | 32 |
