= Daniel Iglesias Jr. =

American filmmaker and video director

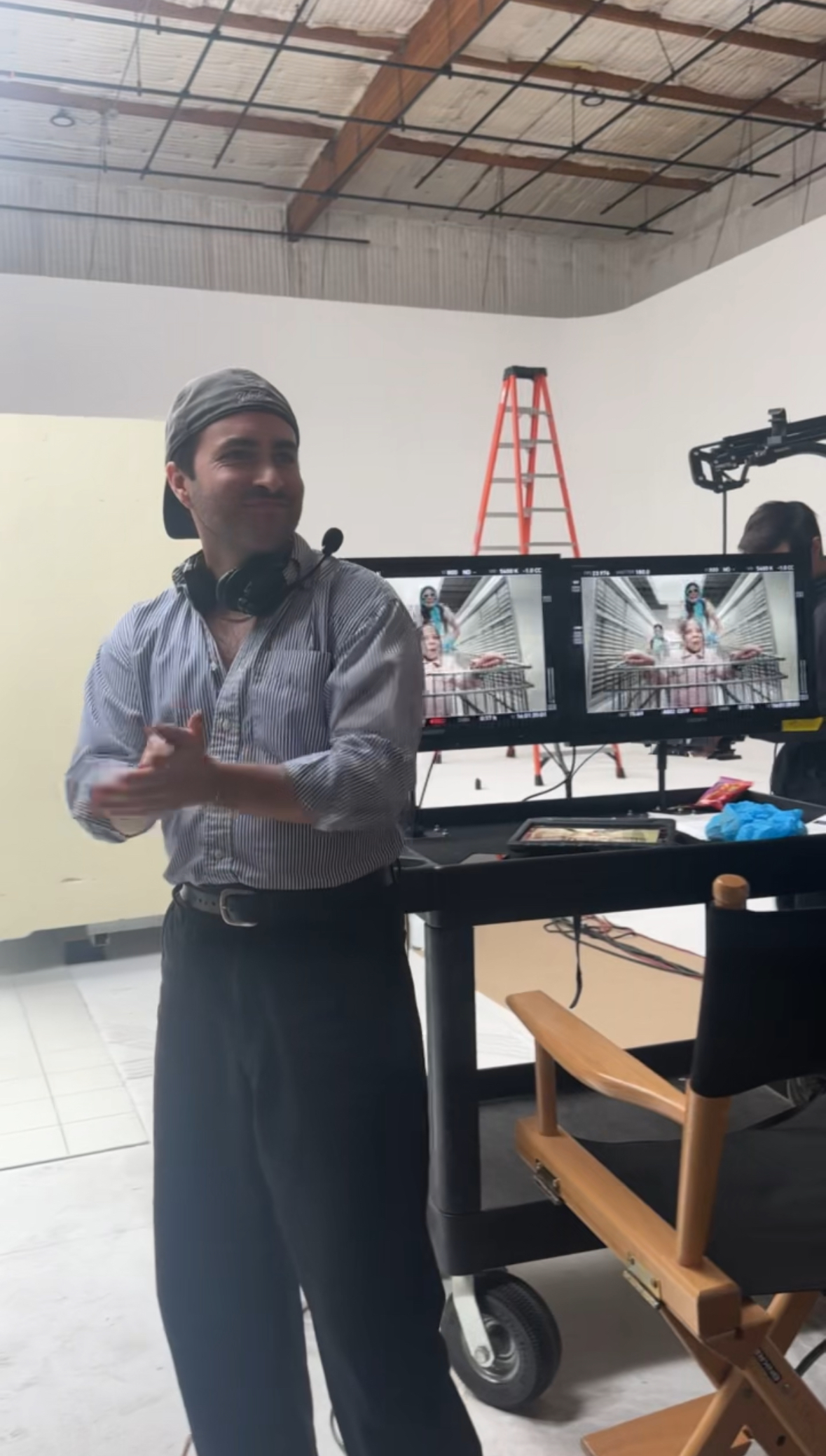
- Born: Moorpark, California, U.S.
- Occupation(s): Director, writer, editor
- Years active: 2012–present

Daniel Iglesias Jr. is an American filmmaker and video director. His music video "BOA" by Megan Thee Stallion earned him a nomination for Best Direction at the 2024 MTV Video Music Awards.

== Life and career ==
Iglesias Jr. was born and raised in Moorpark, California. He attended Chapman University, where he completed a theatre curriculum and graduated with a Bachelor of Fine Arts (BFA) in Screen Acting. While at Chapman, he began his directing career in 2013. His first music video was for "Sweater Weather" by The Neighbourhood, a band formed by friends from his hometown of Moorpark. He has directed music videos, commercials, and fashion films for names and brands in the industry, including Doja Cat, Jonas Brothers, Vogue, and Tanqueray.

== Selected works ==
Year	Title	Artist/Band	Roles	Notes
2013	"Sweater Weather"	The Neighbourhood	Director	
2013	"I Want Crazy"	Hunter Hayes	Director	
2013	"First Time"	Jonas Brothers	Director	
2013	"Afraid"	The Neighbourhood	Director	
2013	"Unconsolable"	X Ambassadors	Director	
2014	"Cardiac Arrest"	Bad Suns	Director	
2014	"One Night"	Tiara Thomas	Director	
2015	"High"	Young Rising Sons	Director	
2015	"Dangerous"	The Neighbourhood feat. YG	Director	
2015	"Renegades"	X Ambassadors	Director	
2015	"Unsteady"	X Ambassadors	Director	
2016	"We Don't Wanna Dance"	Jane	Director	
2018	"These Days"	Wallows	Director	
2018	"Girls"	AJ Mitchell	Director	
2018	"You"	Nicole Bus	Director	
2020	"Like That"	Doja Cat feat Gucci Mane	Director	
2020	"Sunkissed"	Khai Dreams	Director	
2020	"Hell Or High Water"	The Neighbourhood	Director	
2021	"My Own Monster"	X Ambassadors	Director	
2021	"Liquor Store"	Remi Wolf	Director	
2021	"Adrenaline"	X Ambassadors	Director	
2022	"Until I Found You"	Stephen Sanchez	Director	
2022	"Keep it"	Kid Culture	Director	
2024	"Boa"	Megan Thee Stallion	Director	

Fashion Films

- 2017 - Steve Madden : Something to Share
- 2018 - Margaux The Agency : Margaux Vol.1
- 2018 - Vogue China : Death Head Sphinx
- 2021 - Brandon Blackwood : FW21 Show

Commercials

- 2018 - Skyy Vodka: Skyy Blue
- 2022 - Tanqueray: Order Ripple
- 2023 - Welch's: Special to Sparkling
- 2018 - Cash App: Money Dreams

== Awards and nominations ==
Year	Result	Award	Category	Work	Ref.
2019	Won	London Fashion Film Festival	Best Fashion Film	Margaux: Vol.1	
2020	Nominated	Barrie Film Festival	Experimental	Margaux: Vol.1	
2022	Nominated	Webby Awards	Best Music Video	X Ambassadors – "My Own Monster"	
2022	Won	Clio Awards	Bronze award	X Ambassadors – "My Own Monster"	
2024	Won	Clio Awards	Bronze award	Kid Culture – "Keep it"	
2024	Nominated	MTV Video Music Awards	Best Direction	Megan Thee Stallion – "Boa"	
2024	Nominated	MTV Video Music Awards	Best Hip Hop Video	Megan Thee Stallion – "Boa"	
2025	Silver	Telly Awards	Craft-Directing	Megan Thee Stallion – "Boa"	
