= Innings Festival =

Annual music festival in Tempe, Arizona

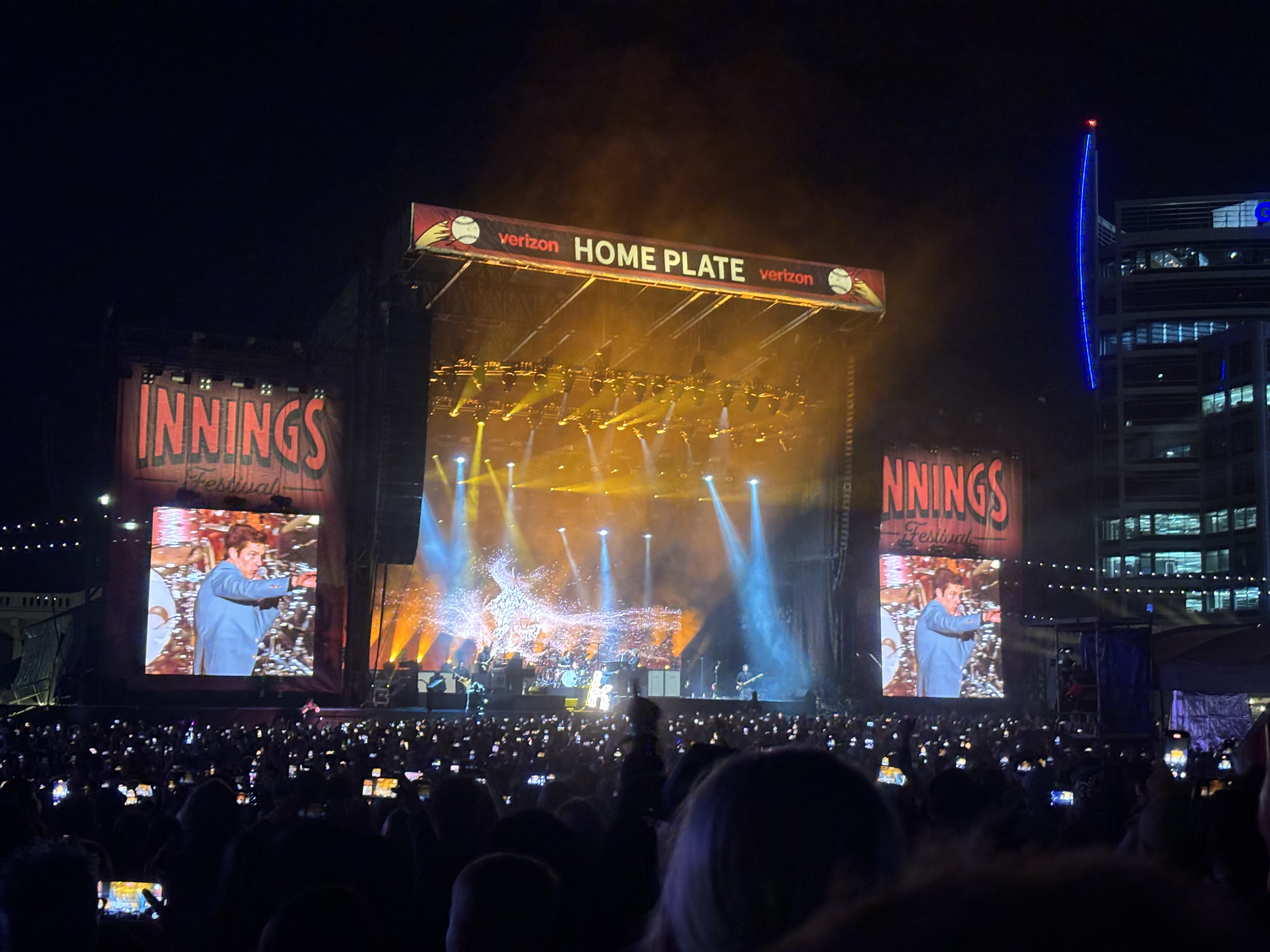
- The Killers headlining the festival in 2025.
- Status: Active
- Frequency: Annually
- Venue: Tempe Beach Park
- Locations: Tempe, Arizona
- Coordinates: 33°25′50.73″N 111°56′28.81″W
- Years active: 2018-present
- Inaugurated: March 23–25, 2018
- Most recent: February 21–22/ February 28-March 1, 2025
- Previous event: February 23–24/ March 1–2, 2024
- Attendance: 40,000 (Two weekend total)
- Website: www.inningsfestival.com

Innings Festival is an annual music festival that takes place in Tempe, Arizona's Tempe Beach Park. The festival takes place over two consecutive weekends on Friday and Saturday corresponding with the start of Arizona's spring training in February. The festival is produced C3 Presents which also produces other music festivals such as Austin City Limits, Lollapalooza, and Gov Ball.

== History ==
The inaugural Innings Festival, a collaboration between Major League Baseball and C3 Presents, took place from Friday, March 23 to Sunday March 25, 2018. The festival included 36 performers across three stages, culinary demos, curated food vendors, family activities, and meet and greets with professional baseball players and some artists, with headliners Queens of the Stone Age, The Avett Brothers, and Chris Stapleton.

In 2019, the festival was shortened to just two days and featured a smaller schedule of eighteen artists.

The 2021 Innings Festival was cancelled due to the COVID-19 pandemic, with organizers hoping to return in 2022.

In late 2021, Innings Festival Florida was announced, a second festival location in Tampa, Florida to play toward both Spring Training leagues (Cactus and Grapefruit). Innings Festival Florida took place at Raymond James Stadium, with Green Day and The Lumineers headlining in 2022. In 2023, headliners were Imagine Dragons and Dave Matthews Band. In October 2023, it was announced that the Florida festival would not be returning.

In 2024, the festival announced that it would be adding a second weekend to event dubbed Extra Innings Fest. Whereas the first weekend contains more rock and alternative artists, the second weekend hosts more country and folk artists.
