= Quail P =

- Born: Seth Paige; February 18, 1999 (age 27)
- Origin: Macclenny, Florida
- Genres: R&B; pop
- Occupations: singer; songwriter; record producer; author
- Years active: 2021–present
- Label: Independent

Seth Paige (born February 18, 1999), known professionally as Quail P, is an American rapper, singer, songwriter, and a former college football player.

== Football ==
=== High School career ===
Paige began his high school career at Baker County High School in Glen St. Mary, Florida coached by Jamie Rodgers, where he was First Team All-State in Class 5A, leading them to a 5A State Championship game his senior year. Rushing for 1,836 yards and 22 TDs during the season, including 840 yards and 10 scores in the playoffs

College recruiting
Name	Hometown	School	Height	Weight	Commit date
Seth Paige; RB		Baker County High School	5 ft 10 in (1.78 m)	176 lb (80 kg)	Dec 17, 2017
Seth Paige; RB	Recruit ratings: 247Sports:				
Overall recruit ranking: 247Sports: (75)
Note: In many cases, Scout, Rivals, 247Sports, On3, and ESPN may conflict in their listings of height and weight.; In these cases, the average was taken. ESPN grades are on a 100-point scale.; Sources: "2018 Team Ranking". Rivals.com.

=== College career ===
- Georgia State Panthers RB #28 (2018-2020)

As a true freshmen, he rushed for 341 yards and 4 TDs in 10 games. In the ULM game, he set a school record on a 82-yard TD run that is the longest run and third-longest play from scrimmage in GSU history. His 145 yards vs. ULM were the most by a Panther since 2012 and the fifth-most ever, and he is just the second GSU freshman to top the 100-yard mark.

In his sophomore season, he rushed 405 yards rushing and four touchdowns, missing the final 5 games to a knee injury. He did score Georgia State's first touchdown in win over Tennessee on a 4-yard run. His junior season was cut short due to covid-19, only playing one game. He soon gave up football and pursued a music career.

==== Stats ====
Season	Team	GP	Rushing					Receiving				
Season	Team	GP	Att	Yds	Avg	TD	LNG	Rec	Yds	Avg.	TD	LNG
2018	Georgia State	10	62	341	5.5	4	82	6	11	10.2	0	16
2019	Georgia State		61	341	6.6	4	65	0	0	0	0	0
2020	Georgia State	1	5	13	2.6	0	6	1	8	8	0	8
Total		0	0	0	0	0	0	0	0	0	0	0

== Music ==
He released his first song called "Lost Emotion" on September 4, 2020. The most streamed song by Quail P is "What You Got" with over 21 million plays on Spotify.

After signing with TWNSHP and Epic Records in 2026, he shortly released his debut single "Wouldn't Try Again".

== Discography ==
=== Albums ===
- Who Is Quail? (2021)
- Baker Blues (2024)
- MACCLENNY EP (2026)

=== Singles ===
List of singles as lead artist, with selected chart positions
Title	Year	Peak chart positions	Album
Title	Year	NZ Hot	Album
"Charlamagne" (featuring Dee Watkins)	2021	—	Who Is Quail?
"What You Got"	2021	—	Who Is Quail?
"Get You the Moon"	2023	—	Non-album single
"I'm Good"	2024	—	Baker Blues
"It's Dark"	2024	—	Baker Blues
"Never Let Go"	2024	—	Baker Blues
"Runaway"	2024	—	Baker Blues
"Happy Tears"	2026	—	TBA
"Wouldn't Try Again"	2026	—	TBA
"Vacation Love"	2026	33	TBA

=== List of live performances ===
In My Own Lane Tour
Date	Town or city	Country	Venue	Notes
May 21, 2026	Orlando, Florida	United States	Conduit	
May 22, 2026	Jacksonville, Florida	United States	Jack Rabbits	Sold out
May 23, 2026	Atlanta, Georgia	United States	Eddie's Attic	Sold out
May 24, 2026	Charlotte, North Carolina	United States	The Evening Muse	Sold out
June 4, 2026	Nashville, Tennessee	United States	The Basement	
June 5, 2026	Memphis, Tennessee	United States	Hernando's Hideaway	
June 6, 2026	Birmingham, Alabama	United States	Woodlawn Theatre	
June 11, 2026	New Orleans, Louisiana	United States	Chickiewahwah	
June 12, 2026	Houston, Texas	United States	The Continental Club	
June 13, 2026	Dallas, Texas	United States	Ruins	
