= The Neighbourhood (album) =

- Standard cover. Hard to Imagine the Neighbourhood Ever Changing features the same image in color.

Studio album by the Neighbourhood
- Released: March 9, 2018
- Studios: Sonora (Los Angeles); Lankershim (Los Angeles)
- Genres: Electropop; ambient
- Length: 42:58
- Label: Columbia
- Producers: Jon Bates; Dylan Brady; Tony DeMatteo; Lewis Hughes; Mighty Mike; Dave Sitek; Lars Stalfors

The Neighbourhood chronology
| Hard to Imagine (2018) | The Neighbourhood (2018) | Ever Changing (2018) |

Singles from The Neighbourhood
- 1. "Scary Love" Released: December 5, 2017

Professional ratings
Aggregate scores
| Source | Rating |
|---|---|
| Metacritic | 62/100 |
Review scores
| Source | Rating |
| AllMusic | 4/5 stars |
| Pitchfork | 4.7/10 |
| PopMatters | 6/10 |

The Neighbourhood is the third studio album by American alternative band the Neighbourhood. It was initially released on March 9, 2018, by Columbia Records.

It was preceded by two EPs: Hard, which was released on September 22, 2017, and To Imagine, released on January 12, 2018. The tracks from the extended plays that were not finally included on the album were compiled in another EP called Hard to Imagine. These tracks were also released in an additional disc on the digital deluxe edition of the album. An edition known as Hard to Imagine the Neighbourhood Ever Changing was released on November 2, 2018, and included all of the EPs' contents and all but two songs from the original album.

== Singles ==
The lead single, "Scary Love" was premiered as December 4, 2017's Zane Lowe's World Record and properly released on digital platforms the next day. To promote the track, the band performed it at The Late Late Show with James Corden on February 20, 2018 and premiered its official music video starring Tommy Wiseau the album's release day, on March 9, 2018.

Before the album's release, two tracks were made available with its pre-order; "Void" on February 16, 2018 and "Nervous" on March 2, 2018.

== Track listing ==
Standard edition
| No. | Title | Writer(s) | Producer(s) | Length |
|---|---|---|---|---|
| 1. | "Flowers" | Jesse Rutherford; Brandon Fried; Jeremiah Freedman; Zachary Abels; Michael Margott; Lars Stalfors | Stalfors | 3:18 |
| 2. | "Scary Love" | Rutherford; Fried; Freedman; Abels; Margott; Mike McGarity; Stalfors | Mighty Mike; Stalfors | 3:44 |
| 3. | "Nervous" | Rutherford; Fried; Freedman; Abels; Margott; Stalfors; Benjamin Levin; Frank Dukes | Stalfors | 4:09 |
| 4. | "Void" | Rutherford; Fried; Freedman; Abels; Margott; Stalfors | Stalfors | 3:25 |
| 5. | "Softcore" | Rutherford; Fried; Freedman; Abels; Margott; Stalfors | Stalfors | 3:28 |
| 6. | "Blue" | Rutherford; Fried; Freedman; Abels; Margott; Jesse St. John Geller; Stalfors; Dylan Brady; Sarah Hudson | Stalfors; Brady | 3:13 |
| 7. | "Sadderdaze" | Rutherford; Fried; Freedman; Abels; Margott; Stalfors; David Andrew Sitek; Matthew Schwartz | Stalfors; Sitek | 4:10 |
| 8. | "Revenge" | Rutherford; Fried; Freedman; Abels; Margott; Stalfors | Stalfors | 3:19 |
| 9. | "You Get Me So High" | Rutherford; Fried; Freedman; Abels; Margott; Stalfors; Tony DeMatteo; Jon Bates | Stalfors; DeMatteo; Bates | 2:33 |
| 10. | "Reflections" | Rutherford; Fried; Freedman; Abels; Margott; Stalfors; Evan Bogart | Stalfors | 4:04 |
| 11. | "Too Serious" | Rutherford; Fried; Freedman; Abels; Margott; Stalfors; Brady; Schwartz | Stalfors; Brady | 3:13 |
| 12. | "Stuck with Me" | Rutherford; Fried; Freedman; Abels; Margott; Stalfors; Lewis Hughes; Nicholas Audino | Stalfors; Hughes | 4:18 |
| Total length: | | | | 42:58 |

Hard to Imagine The Neighbourhood Ever Changing
| No. | Title | Writer(s) | Producer(s) | Length |
|---|---|---|---|---|
| 1. | "Dust" | Rutherford; Fried; Freedman; Abels; Margott; Stalfors; Geller; Hudson | Stalfors | 3:28 |
| 2. | "Kill Us All" (featuring Denzel Curry) | Fried; Denzel Curry; Freedman; Rutherford; Stalfors; Margott; Abels | Stalfors | 2:41 |
| 3. | "24/7" | Rutherford; Fried; Freedman; Abels; Margott; Stalfors; Rick Nowels | Stalfors | 3:41 |
| 4. | "Scary Love" | Rutherford; Fried; Freedman; Abels; Margott; McGarity; Stalfors | Mighty Mike; Stalfors | 3:44 |
| 5. | "Softcore" | Rutherford; Fried; Freedman; Abels; Margott; Stalfors | Stalfors | 3:28 |
| 6. | "Void" | Rutherford; Fried; Freedman; Abels; Margott; Stalfors | Stalfors | 3:25 |
| 7. | "Roll Call" | Rutherford; Fried; Freedman; Abels; Margott; Stalfors | Stalfors | 4:11 |
| 8. | "Livin' in a Dream" (featuring Nipsey Hussle) | Rutherford; Fried; Freedman; Abels; Margott; Stalfors; Ermias Asghedom | Garrett G. Flynn; Stalfors | 3:15 |
| 9. | "You Get Me So High" | Rutherford; Fried; Freedman; Abels; Margott; Stalfors; DeMatteo; Bates | Bates; DeMatteo; Stalfors | 2:33 |
| 10. | "Reflections" | Rutherford; Fried; Freedman; Abels; Margott; Stalfors; Bogart | Stalfors | 4:04 |
| 11. | "Blue" | Rutherford; Fried; Freedman; Abels; Margott; Geller; Hudson; Brady; Stalfors | Brady; Stalfors | 3:13 |
| 12. | "Paradise" | Rutherford; Fried; Freedman; Abels; Margott; Stalfors | Stalfors | 3:29 |
| 13. | "Beat Take 1" (featuring Ghostface Killah) | Nicholas Audino; Rutherford; Fried; Freedman; Abels; Margott; Stalfors; Hughes | Stalfors; Hughes | 3:27 |
| 14. | "Stuck with Me" | Rutherford; Fried; Freedman; Abels; Margott; Stalfors | Stalfors | 4:18 |
| 15. | "Flowers" | Rutherford; Fried; Freedman; Abels; Margott; Stalfors | Stalfors | 3:18 |
| 16. | "Compass" | Rutherford; Fried; Freedman; Abels; Margott; Stalfors | Stalfors | 2:49 |
| 17. | "Noise" | Rutherford; Fried; Freedman; Abels; Margott; Stalfors; DeMatteo; Bates | Bates; DeMatteo; Stalfors | 3:23 |
| 18. | "Heaven" | Rutherford; Fried; Freedman; Abels; Margott; Stalfors; Hudson; Brady; Rock Mafia; Danny Parra | Rock Mafia; Stalfors; Parra | 3:25 |
| 19. | "Nervous" | Rutherford; Fried; Freedman; Abels; Margott; Levin; Dukes; Stalfors | Stalfors | 4:09 |
| 20. | "Sadderdaze" | Rutherford; Fried; Freedman; Abels; Margott; Stalfors; Schwartz; Sitek | Stalfors; Sitek | 4:10 |
| 21. | "Beautiful Oblivion" (featuring IDK) | Rutherford; Fried; Freedman; Abels; Margott; Jason Mills; Stalfors; Schwartz; Sitek | Stalfors; Sitek | 4:23 |
| Total length: | | | | 74:43 |

== Personnel ==
Credits adapted from the album's liner notes.

=== The Neighbourhood ===
- Jesse Rutherford – performance
- Zach Abels – performance (all tracks), background vocals (tracks 1, 7, 9, 12)
- Jeremy Freedman – performance (all tracks), background vocals (1, 7, 9, 12)
- Brandon Fried – performance (all tracks), background vocals (1, 7)
- Mikey Margott – performance (all tracks), background vocals (1, 7, 9, 12)

=== Additional contributors ===
- Lars Stalfors – programming, drum programming, synthesizer (all tracks); mixing (1, 3–6, 8, 11)
- Dave Cerminara – engineering (1–10, 12), programming (11)
- Miro Mackie – engineering (11)
- Mark "Spike" Stent – mixing (2)
- Matty Green – mixing (7, 9, 12)
- Jeff Ellis – mixing (10)
- Michael Freeman – mixing assistance (2)
- Artemio Lujan – mixing assistance (10)
- Joe LaPorta – mastering
- Dylan Brady – programming, synthesizer (6, 11)
- Dave Sitek – drum programming, synthesizer programming (7)
- Tony DeMatteo – programming (9)
- Jon Bates – programming (9)
- Matthew Schwartz – arrangement (10)
- Jen Simone – violin (10)
- Ginger Murphy – cello (10)
- Lewis Hughes – synthesizer programming, drum programming (12)
- Driely S. Carter – photography
- Adam Alessi – artwork, layout

== Charts ==
=== Weekly charts ===
Weekly chart performance for The Neighbourhood
| Chart (2018–2026) | Peak position |
|---|---|
| Canadian Albums (Billboard) | 89 |
| Dutch Albums (Album Top 100) | 106 |
| Greek Albums (IFPI) | 30 |
| New Zealand Heatseeker Albums (RMNZ) | 7 |
| Polish Albums (ZPAV) | 17 |
| US Billboard 200 | 61 |
| US Top Alternative Albums (Billboard) | 4 |
| US Top Rock Albums (Billboard) | 10 |

Weekly chart performance for Hard to Imagine The Neighbourhood Ever Changing
| Chart (2022–2026) | Peak position |
|---|---|
| Belgian Albums (Ultratop Flanders) | 114 |
| Dutch Albums (Album Top 100) | 76 |
| Finnish Albums (Suomen virallinen lista) | 21 |
| German Albums (Offizielle Top 100) | 71 |
| Lithuanian Albums (AGATA) | 16 |
| Norwegian Albums (IFPI Norge) | 11 |
| Portuguese Albums (AFP) | 53 |
| Swiss Albums (Schweizer Hitparade) | 24 |

=== Year-end charts ===
2018 year-end chart performance for Hard to Imagine The Neighbourhood Ever Changing
| Chart (2018) | Position |
|---|---|
| Lithuanian Albums (AGATA) | 33 |

2024 year-end chart performance for Hard to Imagine The Neighbourhood Ever Changing
| Chart (2018) | Position |
|---|---|
| Belgian Albums (Ultratop Flanders) | 183 |
| Hungarian Albums (MAHASZ) | 97 |

== Certifications ==
Certifications for The Neighbourhood
| Region | Certification | Certified units/sales |
|---|---|---|
| Brazil (Pro-Música Brasil) | Diamond | 160,000^{‡} |
| Canada (Music Canada) | Gold | 40,000^{‡} |
| Denmark (IFPI Danmark) | Gold | 10,000^{‡} |
| France (SNEP) | Gold | 50,000^{‡} |
| Italy (FIMI) | Gold | 25,000^{‡} |
| Mexico (AMPROFON) | Platinum+Gold | 90,000^{‡} |
| New Zealand (RMNZ) | Platinum | 15,000^{‡} |
| Poland (ZPAV) | 2× Platinum | 40,000^{‡} |
| United Kingdom (BPI) | Silver | 60,000^{‡} |
| United States (RIAA) | Platinum | 1,000,000^{‡} |
^{‡} Sales+streaming figures based on certification alone.

== Release history ==
List of release dates, showing region, versions, formats, labels, and references
| Region | Date | Format | Version | Label | Ref. |
|---|---|---|---|---|---|
| Various | March 9, 2018 | CD; digital download | Standard | Columbia | |
| Various | March 9, 2018 | Digital download | Deluxe | Columbia | |
