= Wiped Out! =

Studio album by the Neighbourhood
- Released: October 30, 2015
- Genres: Alternative rock; R&B; indie rock
- Length: 45:18
- Label: Columbia
- Producers: 4e; Justyn Pilbrow; Benny Blanco; Jono Dorr

The Neighbourhood chronology
I Love You. (2013)	Wiped Out! (2015)	The Neighbourhood (2018)

Singles from Wiped Out!
- 1. "R.I.P. 2 My Youth" Released: August 20, 2015; 2. "Daddy Issues" Released: May 5, 2016

Wiped Out! is the second studio album by American rock band The Neighbourhood. It was released on October 30, 2015, through Columbia Records. Production was mostly handled by 4e and Justyn Pilbrow, features production from Benny Blanco, with executive production from The Neighbourhood and Kirk Harding.

Wiped Out! peaked at number 13 on the US Billboard 200 and number 1 on the US Top Alternative Albums, making it their first album to reach the summit, alongside moderate international success. The album's lead single, "R.I.P 2 My Youth", was released on August 20, 2015, and charted at number 22 on the US Bubbling Under Hot 100 Singles. The album's second single, "Cry Baby", was serviced to US alternative radio on November 10, 2015. In late 2020, the song "Daddy Issues" received renewed attention after becoming viral on the video-sharing social platform, TikTok.

== Background and development ==
Prior to the release of Wiped Out!, the band released their debut mixtape, #000000 & #FFFFFF, for free.

Conceptualization and writing for the album started in January 2015. The majority of the record was written and recorded in a studio in Malibu and Santa Monica. In an interview with Digital Trends, bandmate Zach Abels recalls, “We did the second half of the album at my mom’s house, where we originally wrote "Sweater Weather"" "Baby Came Home 2/Valentines" was written on their tour bus during their North American tour. "Prey" was written and recorded near the end of the album's creation process. On the album's title, Rutherford comments, "Wiped Out! was just an internal strife. The album is called Wiped Out! because at the end of it we were all really exhausted," and adds, "It was called Wiped Out! before we even started it because we were exhausted from the beginning!"

== Critical reception ==
Professional ratings
Aggregate scores
Source	Rating
AnyDecentMusic?	5.5/10
Metacritic	53/100
Review scores
Source	Rating
AllMusic	3/5 stars
Billboard	3/5 stars
DIY	3/5 stars
Exclaim!	7/10
Mojo	3/5 stars
Rolling Stone	2.5/5 stars
Uncut	3/10

The album received generally mixed reviews. Writing for Exclaim!, Ryan B. Patrick called the record "a "see what sticks" effort; it's slick and polished, but hits varying levels of satisfaction throughout."

Natasha West, from DIY, said that "Wiped Out! delivers a message of heartbreak, hope and heartfelt honesty" and "having successfully mixed pop, rock and hip-hop together, it seems like they have finally defined their sound as a band". A review published by Mojo Magazine, stated, "The LA quintet still sound like 16-year-old boys... Musically, though, their slick soulful pop-R&B is far more refined". For Matt Collar, from AllMusic, it "doesn't hurt that cuts like "Cry Baby," "Daddy Issues," and "Greetings from Califournia" counteract the band's somewhat downtempo vibe with catchy melodies and light, dance-oriented beats. As the black & white album cover illustration of a palm tree on a beach implies, this is surf music for street goths and beach bums with bad attitudes".

Kenneth Partridge, from Billboard, wrote, "The subtler, less stylized Wiped Out! keeps the palm-trees-at-twilight feel, but the sound is more hazy R&B than rock". David Turner, from Rolling Stone, thinks that "the warmth of "Sweater Weather" and the rest of the Neighbourhood's debut album is gone on Wiped Out!, replaced by a ponderous kind of cool". Uncut's published review was that the album is "a stylistic and conceptual vacuum."

== Track listing ==
All tracks produced by Justyn Pilbrow and 4e, except where noted.

Wiped Out! track listing
No.	Title	Writer(s)	Producer(s)	Length
1.	"A Moment of Silence"			0:30
2.	"Prey"	Jonathan Dorr; Cecil Bernardy; The Neighbourhood; Brandon Fried		4:47
3.	"Cry Baby"	Pilbrow; The Neighbourhood; Fried		3:56
4.	"Wiped Out!"	Pilbrow; The Neighbourhood; Fried		6:15
5.	"The Beach"	Pilbrow; The Neighbourhood; Fried		4:17
6.	"Daddy Issues"	Pilbrow; The Neighbourhood; Fried		4:20
7.	"Baby Came Home 2 / Valentines"	The Neighbourhood; Fried		6:35
8.	"Greetings from Califournia"	Pilbrow; Dorr; Bernardy; The Neighbourhood; Fried		3:50
9.	"Ferrari"	Pilbrow; The Neighbourhood; Fried		3:03
10.	"Single"	The Neighbourhood; Fried		4:20
11.	"R.I.P. 2 My Youth"	Pilbrow; The Neighbourhood; Benny Blanco	4e; Blanco; Pilbrow	3:27
Total length:				45:17

== Personnel ==
Credits adapted from the liner notes of Wiped Out!

Performance credits

- The Neighbourhood – vocals

Production

- Justyn Pilbrow – producer
- 4e – producer; assistant producer (track 11); engineer (tracks 1–6, 8–11)
- Benny Blanco – producer (track 11)
- Kirk Harding – executive producer
- The Neighbourhood – executive producer
- Chris Mullings – engineer (tracks 1–6, 8–11)
- Erik Reichers – engineer (track 7)
- Jason Hiller – assistant engineer (track 7)
- Mark Stent – mixer
- Geoff Swan – assistant mixer
- Chris Gehringer – mastering

Creative

- Matt Baus – creative director
- Cameron McCool – photography
- Adri Law – photography

== Charts ==
=== Weekly charts ===
Chart performance for Wiped Out!
Chart (2015)	Peak position
Australian Albums (ARIA)	57
Belgian Albums (Ultratop Flanders)	156
Canadian Albums (Billboard)	15
New Zealand Albums (RMNZ)	37
UK Albums (Official Charts)	86
US Billboard 200	13
US Top Alternative Albums (Billboard)	1
US Top Rock Albums (Billboard)	2

2025–2026 weekly chart performance for Wiped Out!
Chart (2025–2026)	Peak position
Belgian Albums (Ultratop Flanders)	124
Belgian Albums (Ultratop Wallonia)	181
Dutch Albums (Album Top 100)	92
Norwegian Albums (IFPI Norge)	23
Norwegian Rock Albums (IFPI Norge)	10
Polish Albums (ZPAV)	36
Portuguese Albums (AFP)	67
Swiss Albums (Schweizer Hitparade)	21

=== Year-end charts ===
Year-end chart performance for Wiped Out!
Chart (2022)	Position
Lithuanian Albums (AGATA)	25

== Certifications ==
Certifications for Wiped Out!
Region	Certification	Certified units/sales
Brazil (Pro-Música Brasil)	Platinum	40,000^{‡}
Canada (Music Canada)	Gold	40,000^{‡}
Denmark (IFPI Danmark)	Gold	10,000^{‡}
Italy (FIMI)	Gold	25,000^{‡}
Mexico (AMPROFON)	Platinum+Gold	90,000^{‡}
New Zealand (RMNZ)	Platinum	15,000^{‡}
Poland (ZPAV)	3× Platinum	60,000^{‡}
United Kingdom (BPI)	Gold	100,000^{‡}
United States (RIAA)	Gold	500,000^{‡}
^{‡} Sales+streaming figures based on certification alone.

== Release history ==
Release history for Wiped Out!
Region	Date	Format	Label	Ref.
United States	October 30, 2015	Digital download; CD	Columbia	
United States	February 19, 2016	LP	Columbia	
United Kingdom	February 19, 2016	LP	Columbia	
Germany	February 19, 2016	LP	Columbia; Sony	
