= R.I.P. 2 My Youth =

Single by the Neighbourhood

from the album Wiped Out!
- Released: August 20, 2015
- Genre: Hip hop
- Length: 3:27
- Label: Columbia
- Songwriters: Jesse Rutherford; Zachary Abels; Michael Margott; Jeremiah Freedman; Justyn Pilbrow; Benjamin Levin
- Producers: Benny Blanco; Pilbrow; 4e

The Neighbourhood singles chronology
"Afraid" (2014)	"R.I.P. 2 My Youth" (2015)	"Scary Love" (2017)

Music video
- "R.I.P. 2 My Youth" on YouTube

"R.I.P. 2 My Youth" is a song by American band the Neighbourhood. It was released on August 20, 2015 as the lead single of their second album Wiped Out! A music video for the track, directed by Hype Williams was released on September 16, 2015. The song entered the UK Singles Chart at No. 85. It was their first time entering this chart after their hit single "Sweater Weather".

== Charts ==
=== Weekly charts ===
Weekly chart performance for "R.I.P. 2 My Youth"
Chart (2015)	Peak position
Canada Rock (Billboard)	42
Scottish Singles Sales (Official Charts)	51
UK Singles (Official Charts)	85
US Bubbling Under Hot 100 (Billboard)	22
US Hot Rock & Alternative Songs (Billboard)	13
US Rock & Alternative Airplay (Billboard)	38

=== Year-end charts ===
Year-end chart performance for "R.I.P. 2 My Youth"
Chart (2015)	Position
US Hot Rock Songs (Billboard)	82

== Certifications ==
Certifications for "R.I.P. 2 My Youth"
Region	Certification	Certified units/sales
Brazil (Pro-Música Brasil)	Platinum	60,000^{‡}
Canada (Music Canada)	Gold	40,000^{‡}
Mexico (AMPROFON)	Gold	30,000^{‡}
Poland (ZPAV)	Gold	25,000^{‡}
United States (RIAA)	Platinum	1,000,000^{‡}
^{‡} Sales+streaming figures based on certification alone.
