= The Neighbourhood =

American rock band

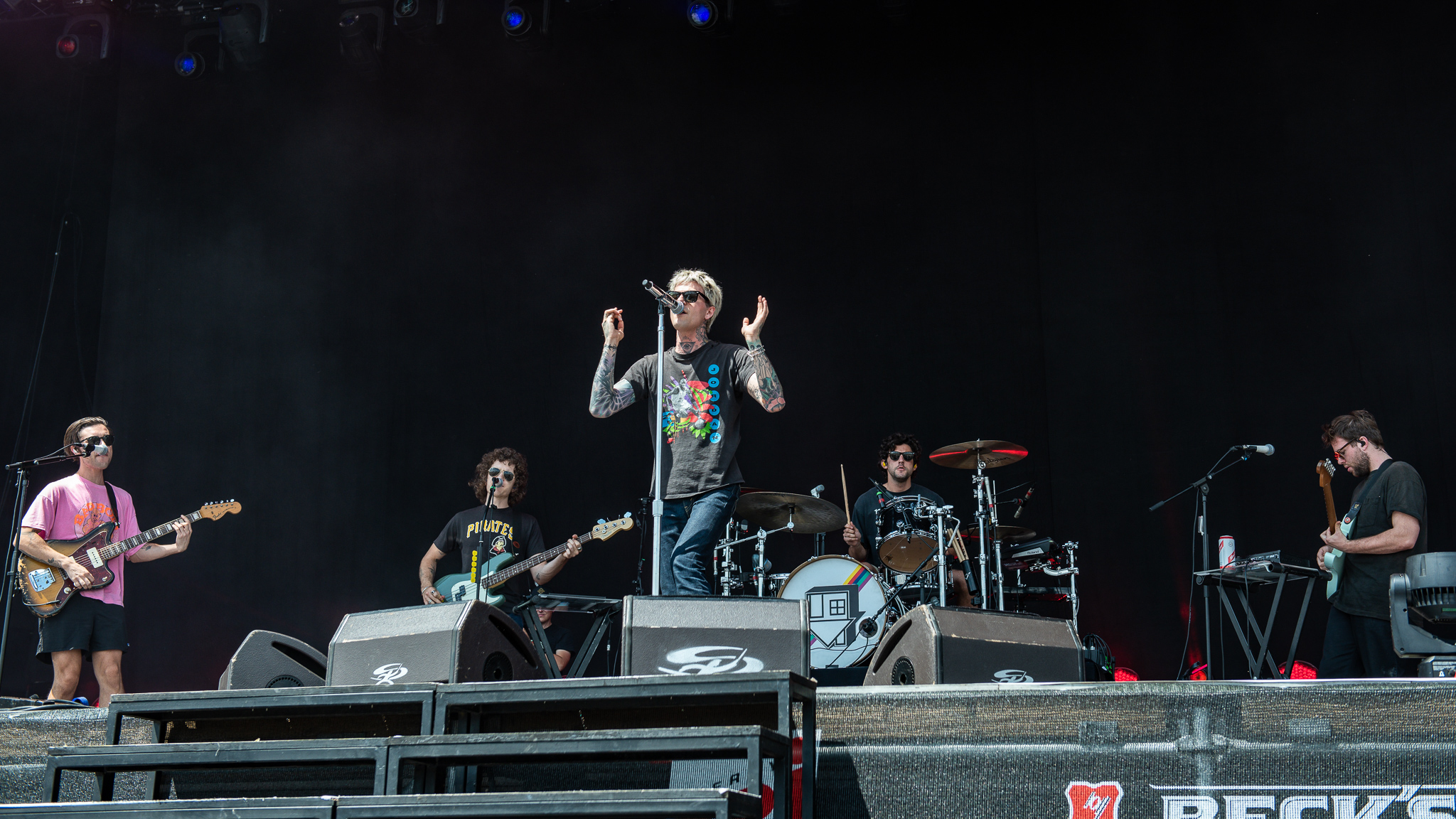
- The Neighbourhood performing in 2018

Background information
- Also known as: The NBHD (abbreviation)
- Origin: Newbury Park, California, U.S.
- Genres: Alternative rock; indie rock; pop rock
- Years active: 2011–2022; 2025–present
- Labels: Universal; Columbia; Warner
- Members: Jesse Rutherford; Jeremy Freedman; Zach Abels; Mikey Margott; Brandon Fried
- Past members: Bryan "Olivver The Kid" Sammis
- Website: thenbhd.com

The Neighbourhood (abbreviated as The NBHD) is an American alternative rock band formed in Newbury Park, California, in 2011. The band consists of vocalist Jesse Rutherford, guitarists Jeremy Fredman and Zach Abels, bassist Mikey Margott and drummer Brandon Fried. After releasing two EPs, I'm Sorry... and Thank You, The Neighbourhood signed with Columbia Records to release their debut studio album, I Love You. in 2013. "Sweater Weather", the album's third single, became the only song from the project on the Billboard Hot 100, peaking at number 14, and resurged in popularity nearly a decade later on radio airplay and Spotify. Other notable hits from the band include "Afraid", "Daddy Issues", "Baby Come Home 2/Valentines", "Softcore", "You Get Me So High", "Reflections" and "The Beach".

Later in 2013, the EP "The Love Collection" was released, followed by a mixtape titled #000000 & #FFFFFF in 2014. The band's second studio album, Wiped Out!, was released in October 2015. In March 2018, their self-titled third studio album was released, preceded by the EPs "Hard" and "To Imagine", and followed by the EP "Ever Changing". Tracks from these EPs not included on the final album were later compiled into the LP Hard to Imagine the Neighbourhood Ever Changing. In 2020, The band's fourth studio album Chip Chrome and the Mono-Tones was released. In February 2022, it was reported that the band was taking an indefinite hiatus, following the removal of lead drummer Brandon Fried, who faced sexual misconduct allegations involving María Zardoya of The Marías. In August 2025, the band posted an Instagram story indicating their return to creating and releasing music, with Fried rejoining the band.

Lead singer Jesse Rutherford began a solo music career in 2016 and signed a solo contract with Atlantic Records in March 2023.

== History ==
=== Formation and I Love You. (2011–2013) ===
The Neighbourhood was formed in August 2011 by lead singer Jesse Rutherford, guitarists Zachary Abels and Jeremiah Freedman, bassist Michael Margott and drummer Bryan 'Olivver The Kid' Sammis. The members of The Neighbourhood chose the British spelling of "neighbourhood" on the advice of their manager, in order to distinguish themselves from a band already using the American spelling; which is why their song titles also use the British spelling.

In early 2012, The Neighbourhood released "Female Robbery" and "Sweater Weather". In May 2012, the band unveiled their debut self-released extended play titled I'm Sorry... for free download, produced by Justyn Pilbrow. In December 2012, the Neighbourhood released their second EP, Thank You,.

The band performed at Coachella in 2013, anticipating their debut album I Love You., which was premiered on April 16, 2013, via Rolling Stone and officially released on April 23, 2013, via Columbia Records. It debuted at number 39 on the US Billboard 200 albums chart, selling 9,000 units in its first week. It was preceded by the lead single "Sweater Weather", which music video was released on March 5, 2013. They made their first televised performance of the song on June 27, 2013, at Jimmy Kimmel Live. "Sweater Weather" reached the top of the charts in early June 2013, hitting number one on Billboard Alternative Songs chart and breaking the top ten on Billboard Heatseekers Songs chart.

The band went on tour opening for Imagine Dragons in July and September 2013. The Neighbourhood also made two appearances in Eastern Canada during the summer of 2013. They played as one of the headliners of Toronto, Canada's Edgefest on July 31, 2013, and then a few days later played at Canada's largest music festival, Osheaga, in Montreal on August 4. The Neighbourhood performed at Atlanta's Music Midtown on September 21, 2013.

=== #000000 & #FFFFFF and Wiped Out! (2014–2015) ===
In April 2013, The Neighbourhood announced their summer 2013 tour called The Love Collection Tour along with Lovelife, the 1975, and JMSN. as well as that they were planning the release of a mixtape. On December 10, 2013, they released a new EP called The Love Collection. On January 16, 2014, the band revealed on social media that drummer Bryan Sammis was leaving the band.

On November 28, 2014, the band finally released the project, titled #000000 & #FFFFFF (the hexadecimal color codes for black and white, respectively) for free. It was hosted by DJ Drama and features guest appearances by YG, Dej Loaf, French Montana, Danny Brown, G-Eazy and others. The mixtape was officially released for streaming and download on November 22, 2017.

In August 2015, the band announced the upcoming October 30 release of their second album Wiped Out!. It was preceded by the lead single "R.I.P. 2 My Youth" and reached the number 13 position on the US Billboard 200. The band embarked on a European tour in November 2015 and on an American tour in May and June 2016 to support the album.

=== Hard to Imagine, album, Self-titled Album, Chip Chrome & the Mono-Tones and hiatus (2017–2025) ===
On September 21, 2017, the Neighbourhood released the EP Hard, which reached number 183 on the US Billboard 200 chart. Another EP called To Imagine was released on January 12, 2018. The band later announced their third studio album The Neighbourhood, released March 9, 2018, which included tracks from the previous extended plays, including the lead single "Scary Love". After the release, the tracks from the extended plays that were not included on the final tracklisting were collected in another EP called Hard to Imagine. The band then released the complete edition of the album, titled Hard to Imagine the Neighbourhood Ever Changing which featured all songs released from Hard, To Imagine, The Neighbourhood, and Ever Changing, except the two tracks "Revenge" and "Too Serious".

On August 16, 2019, they premiered a music video along with their single, "Middle of Somewhere". On October 10, 2019, the Neighbourhood's single, "Yellow Box" was released and featured on an action game, Death Stranding. They released a lyric video for "Yellow Box" on November 7, 2019.

On July 31, 2020, the band announced the September 25 release of their fourth album Chip Chrome & the Mono-Tones. It was preceded by a single "Cherry Flavoured", which they released in a playlist named after the album via various streaming services. The playlist is a compilation of the band's essential songs, plus the single. In description of the playlist was, quote: "Album out 9/25". In late 2020, their songs "Sweater Weather", from their album I Love You. and "Daddy Issues" from their album, Wiped Out!, went viral on TikTok, gaining more streams across platforms.

In February 2022, the band announced that they would be taking a hiatus. On November 13, 2022, the band announced on social media that drummer Brandon Fried would no longer be in the Neighbourhood after Marías lead vocalist María Zardoya accused him of sexual assault.

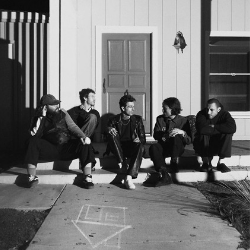
Official portrait, 2025

=== Return to music and Ultrasound (2025–present) ===
On August 29, 2025, the official Instagram account of The Neighbourhood posted a story, indicating their return to creating and releasing music. Additionally, they announced drummer Brandon Fried would return to the band. On October 23, 2025, the band released three songs, "OMG", "Lovebomb", and "Private", from their fifth studio album titled Ultrasound (stylized as (((((ultraSOUND)))))), released on November 14, 2025.

== Musical style ==
The Neighbourhood's musical style has been described as alternative rock, indie rock, and pop rock with elements of electronic, hip hop and R&B.

== Members ==
Lineup

- Jesse Rutherford – lead vocals (2011–present)
- Zachary Abels – lead and rhythm guitar (2011–present), backing vocals (2015–present)
- Jeremiah Freedman – rhythm and lead guitar, backing vocals (2011–present)
- Michael Margott – bass guitar (2011–present), backing vocals (2015–present)
- Brandon Fried – drums, percussion, backing vocals (2014–2022; 2025–present)

Former members

- Bryan "Olivver" Sammis – drums, percussion, backing vocals (2011–2014)

Timeline

== Discography ==
=== Albums ===
==== Studio albums ====
List of studio albums, with selected chart positions
Title	Album details	Peak chart positions										Certifications
Title	Album details	US	AUS	BEL	CAN	FIN	NLD	NZ	POL	SCO	UK	Certifications
I Love You.	Released: April 22, 2013; Label: Columbia; Formats: CD, LP, digital download	25	— (Note: I Love You did not enter the Australian ARIA Albums Chart but peaked at number eight on the ARIA Hitseekers Chart.)	—	20	37	58	—	33	92	70	RIAA: 2× Platinum; BPI: Gold; MC: Platinum; RMNZ: 2× Platinum; ZPAV: Platinum
Wiped Out!	Released: October 30, 2015; Label: Columbia; Formats: CD, LP, digital download	13	57	124	15	—	92	37	56	—	86	RIAA: Gold; BPI: Gold; MC: Gold; RMNZ: Platinum; ZPAV: 2× Platinum
The Neighbourhood	Released: March 9, 2018; Label: Columbia; Formats: CD, LP, digital download	61	— (Note: The Neighbourhood did not enter the Australian ARIA Albums Chart but peaked at number 10 on the ARIA Hitseekers Chart.)	—	89	—	106	— (Note: The Neighbourhood did not enter the NZ Top 40 Albums Chart, but peaked at number 7 on the NZ Heatseeker Albums Chart.)	17	—	—	RIAA: Platinum; RMNZ: Platinum; ZPAV: Platinum
Chip Chrome & the Mono-Tones	Released: September 25, 2020; Label: Columbia; Formats: LP, digital download	—	—	—	—	—	—	—	—	—	—	
Ultrasound	Released: November 14, 2025; Label: Warner; Formats: Digital download, streaming	155	49	157	—	—	—	35	—	—	—	
"—" denotes a recording that did not chart or was not released in that territory.

==== Reissued albums ====
List of studio albums, with selected chart positions
Title	Album details	Peak chart positions								Certifications
Title	Album details	US Rock	BEL	FIN	LTU	NOR	NLD	POR	SWI	Certifications
Hard to Imagine The Neighbourhood Ever Changing	Released: November 2, 2018; Label: Columbia; Formats: CD, LP, digital download	42	114	21	15	11	77	53	60	BPI: Gold

=== Extended plays ===
List of extended plays, with selected chart positions
Title	EP details	Peak chart positions			Certifications
Title	EP details	US	US Rock	NZ Heat.	Certifications
I'm Sorry...	Released: May 7, 2012; Label: Columbia; Formats: CD, 10", digital download	— (Note: I'm Sorry... did not enter the US Billboard 200, but peaked at number 11 on the US Billboard Heatseekers Albums Chart.)	—	—	MC: Gold
Thank You,	Released: December 17, 2012; Label: Columbia; Formats: CD, 7", digital download	—	—	—	
Spotify Sessions	Released: June 18, 2013; Label: Columbia; Formats: Digital download	—	—	—	
The Love Collection	Released: December 10, 2013; Label: Columbia; Formats: Digital download	—	—	—	
Hard	Released: September 22, 2017; Label: Columbia; Formats: Digital download	183	39	9	
To Imagine	Released: January 12, 2018; Label: Columbia; Formats: Digital download	— (Note: To Imagine did not enter the US Billboard 200, but peaked at number 79 on the US Billboard Current Album Sales Chart.)	— (Note: "To Imagine" did not enter the Top Rock Albums chart, but peaked at number 26 on the Rock Album Sales chart.)	7	
Hard to Imagine	Released: March 9, 2018; Label: Columbia; Formats: Digital download	—	—	—	MC: Gold
Ever Changing	Released: September 21, 2018; Label: Columbia; Formats: Digital download	—	—	—	
Pretty Boy	Released: August 28, 2020; Label: Columbia; Formats: Digital download	—	—	—	
Private	Released: October 23, 2025; Laber: Warner; Formats: Digital download	—	—	—	
"—" denotes a recording that did not chart or was not released in that territory.

=== Mixtapes ===
List of mixtapes
Title	Album details
#000000 & #FFFFFF	Release: November 28, 2014; Label: Columbia; Formats: Digital download, streams

=== Singles ===
List of singles, with selected chart positions and certifications, showing year released and album name
Title	Year	Peak chart positions										Certifications	Album
Title	Year	US	AUS	BRA	CAN	GER	GRE	POR	SWI	UK	WW	Certifications	Album
"Female Robbery"	2012	—	—	—	—	—	—	—	—	—	—	RIAA: Gold; PMB: Gold	I Love You.
"Sweater Weather"	2012	14	31	98	68	27	2	31	16	49	21	RIAA: 16× Platinum; AFP: 3× Platinum; ARIA: 10× Platinum; BPI: 4× Platinum; BVMI: Platinum; IFPI GRE: Diamond; FIMI: 2× Platinum; MC: 7× Platinum; PMB: 7× Diamond	I Love You.
"Let It Go"	2013	—	—	—	—	—	—	—	—	— (Note: "Let It Go" did not enter the UK Singles Chart, but peaked at number 86 on the UK Physical Singles Chart Top 100.)	—		I Love You.
"Afraid"	2013	— (Note: "Afraid" did not enter the US Billboard Hot 100, but peaked at number 15 on the Bubbling Under Hot 100 Singles chart.)	—	—	—	—	—	—	—	—	—	RIAA: 2× Platinum; ARIA: Platinum; BPI: Silver; MC: Platinum; PMB: 3× Platinum	I Love You.
"R.I.P. 2 My Youth"	2015	— (Note: "R.I.P. 2 My Youth" did not enter the Billboard Hot 100, but peaked at number 22 on the Bubbling Under Hot 100 Singles chart.)	— (Note: "R.I.P. 2 My Youth" did not enter the Australian ARIA Singles Chart but peaked at number seven on the ARIA Hitseekers Chart.)	—	—	—	—	—	—	85	—	RIAA: Platinum; MC: Gold; PMB: Platinum	Wiped Out!
"Daddy Issues" (original or featuring Syd)	2015	—	—	—	—	—	30	110	—	—	—	RIAA: 5× Platinum; AFP: Platinum; ARIA: 4× Platinum; BPI: Platinum; BVMI: Gold; IFPI GRE: 3× Platinum; FIMI: Gold; MC: 3× Platinum; PMB: 2× Diamond	Wiped Out!
"Scary Love"	2017	—	—	—	—	—	—	—	—	—	—	RIAA: Gold; PMB: Platinum	The Neighbourhood
"Livin' in a Dream"	2018	—	—	—	—	—	—	—	—	—	—		Ever Changing EP
"Middle of Somewhere"	2019	—	—	—	—	—	—	—	—	—	—	PMB: Gold	Chip Chrome & the Mono-Tones
"Yellow Box"	2019	—	—	—	—	—	—	—	—	—	—		Death Stranding: Timefall
"Cherry Flavoured"	2020	—	—	—	—	—	—	—	—	—	—	PMB: Gold	Chip Chrome & the Mono-Tones
"Lost in Translation"	2020	—	—	—	—	—	—	—	—	—	—		Chip Chrome & the Mono-Tones
"Stargazing"	2020	—	—	—	—	—	—	—	—	—	—	RIAA: Platinum; MC: Gold; PMB: Platinum	Chip Chrome & the Mono-Tones
"Fallen Star"	2021	—	—	—	—	—	—	—	—	—	—		Non-album single
"Private"	2025	—	—	—	—	—	—	—	—	—	—		Ultrasound
"OMG"	2025	—	—	—	—	—	—	—	—	—	—		Ultrasound
"Lovebomb"	2025	—	—	—	—	—	—	—	—	—	—		Ultrasound
"Hula Girl"	2025	—	—	—	—	—	—	—	—	—	—		Ultrasound
"—" denotes a recording that did not chart or was not released in that territory.

==== Promotional singles ====
List of singles, with selected chart positions, showing year released and album name
Title	Year	Peak chart positions			Certifications	Album
Title	Year	US Alt. DL	US Rock	CZ	Certifications	Album
"#icanteven" (featuring French Montana)	2014	—	—	83		#000000 & #FFFFFF
"The Beach"	2015	—	34	—	RIAA: Platinum; ARIA: Gold; BPI: Silver; MC: Gold; PMB: 2× Platinum	Wiped Out!
"Prey"	2015	—	39	—	PMB: Platinum	Wiped Out!
"Stuck With Me"	2017	18	42	—	PMB: Gold	The Neighbourhood
"Void"	2018	—	45	—	PMB: Platinum	The Neighbourhood
"Nervous"	2018	—	38	—	RIAA: Gold	The Neighbourhood
"Devil's Advocate"	2020	—	—	—	PMB: Gold	Chip Chrome & the Mono-Tones
"Pretty Boy"	2020	—	—	—	RIAA: Platinum; ARIA: Gold; PMB: Platinum	Chip Chrome & the Mono-Tones
"—" denotes a recording that did not chart or was not released in that territory.

=== Other charted and certified songs ===
List of other charted songs, with selected chart positions, showing year released and album name
Title	Year	Peak chart positions										Certifications	Album
Title	Year	US Rock	AUT	GER	GRE	IRE	NLD	POR	SWI	UK	WW	Certifications	Album
"Wires"	2012	—	—	—	—	—	—	—	—	—	—	RIAA: Gold	I'm Sorry...
"W.D.Y.W.F.M?"	2013	—	—	—	—	—	—	—	—	—	—	RIAA: Gold	I Love You.
"Flawless"	2013	—	—	—	—	—	—	—	—	—	—	RIAA: Gold	I Love You.
"A Little Death"	2013	—	—	—	52	—	—	—	—	—	—	RIAA: Gold; IFPI GRE: Gold	I Love You.
"Prey"	2015	—	—	—	—	—	—	—	—	—	—	RIAA: Gold	Wiped Out!
"Cry Baby"	2015	25	—	—	—	—	—	—	—	—	—	RIAA: Platinum; ARIA: Gold; BPI: Silver	Wiped Out!
"Baby Came Home 2 / Valentines"	2015	—	—	—	—	—	—	—	—	—	—	RIAA: Gold	Wiped Out!
"Single"	2015	49	—	—	—	—	—	—	—	—	—		Wiped Out!
"24/7"	2017	49	—	—	—	—	—	—	—	—	—		Hard
"Softcore"	2018	— (Note: "Softcore" did not enter the US Hot Rock & Alternative Songs chart, but peaked at number 10 on the Rock Streaming Songs chart.)	32	45	11	78	78	79	33	51	65	RIAA: 3× Platinum; ARIA: 3× Platinum; BPI: Platinum; BVMI: Gold; FIMI: Gold; IFPI GRE: 3× Platinum	The Neighbourhood
"You Get Me So High"	2018	—	—	—	89	—	—	—	—	—	—	RIAA: 2× Platinum; ARIA: Platinum; BPI: Silver	The Neighbourhood
"Reflections"	2018	—	—	—	3	99	—	136	66	—	153	RIAA: Platinum; AFP: Platinum; ARIA: Platinum; BPI: Gold; IFPI GRE: 2× Platinum	The Neighbourhood
"Devil's Advocate"	2020	—	—	—	—	—	—	—	—	—	—	RIAA: Gold	Chip Chrome & the Mono-Tones
"—" denotes a recording that did not chart or was not released in that territory.

=== Other appearances ===
List of other appearances showing year released and album name
Title	Year	Album
"Honest"	2014	The Amazing Spider-Man 2: The Original Motion Picture Soundtrack

=== Music videos ===
Title	Year	Director(s)
"Female Robbery"	2012	ENDS
"Let It Go"	2012	ENDS
"A Little Death"	2012	ENDS
"Sweater Weather"	2013	ENDS
"Afraid"	2013	ENDS
"Lurk"	2014	—N/a
"#icanteven"	2015	Eif Rivera
"Dangerous"	2015	Jake Janisse
"Warm"	2015	Dexter Navy
"R.I.P. 2 My Youth"	2015	Hype Williams
"Daddy Issues"	2016	Warren Kommers
"Hard to Imagine"	2018	Jack Begert
"Scary Love"	2018	Jennifer Juniper Stratford
"Middle of Somewhere"	2019	Alex McDonell
"Cherry Flavoured"	2020	Christopher Wilson
"Devil's Advocate"	2020	Adam Baldwin & Calvin Reboya
"Pretty Boy"	2020	Ramez Silyan
"Lost In Translation"	2020	Mowgly Lee
"Hell or High Water"	2020	Daniel Iglesias Jr.
"Stargazing"	2020	Ramez Silyan

== Tours ==
=== Headlining ===
- The Drought Tour (2013)
- The Love Collection Tour (2013)
- El Tour Blanco (2014)
- The Flood Tour (2015)
- NU Waves Tour (2016)
- The Middle of Somewhere Tour (2019)
- Wourld Tour (2026)
- Wourld Tour II (2027)
