= I Love You (The Neighbourhood album) =

I Love You.

Studio album by the Neighbourhood
- Released: April 22, 2013
- Recorded: 2011–2012
- Genres: Indie rock; electropop
- Length: 45:46
- Label: Columbia
- Producers: Justyn Pilbrow; Emile Haynie

The Neighbourhood chronology
Thank You, (2012)	I Love You. (2013)	The Love Collection (2013)

Singles from I Love You.
- 1. "Female Robbery" Released: October 8, 2012; 2. "Sweater Weather" Released: December 3, 2012; 3. "Let It Go" Released: January 14, 2013; 4. "Afraid" Released: July 23, 2013

I Love You (stylized as I Love You.) is the debut studio album by American rock band the Neighbourhood, which was released worldwide on April 22, 2013.

== Background ==
The tracks on this album expresses a series of angst-ridden themes based on both the vibe and lyrical content of the songs. Bryan Sammis explained to Coup De Main magazine: "I think that at least in terms of the musical aspect of it, all of us try and get our own emotions out through our instruments, which is not always the easiest thing to do. I think for Jesse Rutherford lyrically, what I really like about him and about us as a band is that a lot of his lyrics aren't necessarily pre-ordained, because he's not trying to force it. A lot of his lyrics are off the top of his head when he first hears the song, because that makes it more natural, it's legitimately what he is thinking about and how he is feeling when he hears that song."

== Critical reception ==
Professional ratings
Aggregate scores
Source	Rating
AnyDecentMusic?	5.3/10
Metacritic	48/100
Review scores
Source	Rating
AllMusic	2.5/5 stars
DIY	7/10
Drowned in Sound	3/10
Financial Times	2/5 stars
The Guardian	3/5 stars
The Irish Times	3/5 stars
Los Angeles Times	2/4 stars
MusicOMH	2.5/5 stars
PopMatters	5/10
Q	2/5 stars

Reception to I Love You was mixed. At Metacritic, which assigns a normalized rating out of 100 to reviews from mainstream critics, the album received an average score of 48, based on 8 reviews. Los Angeles Times critic Mikael Wood wrote that despite the band's mastery of the "textural know-how" of contemporary alternative rock, their songs mostly "stretch out into dreary electro-goth atmospherics" and "lack any kind of urgency". AllMusic editor Tim Sendra found that the album's music rarely deviates from its "ponderous nature", ultimately "leaving the listener with an overall experience that is oppressively grey and joyless". Kat Rolle of Drowned in Sound deemed its lyrics to be "inane" and thematically limited to "California and sex", while panning the band's musical approach as unoriginal and calculated for mass appeal.

In a positive review, Jamie Milton of DIY wrote that the Neighbourhood "stick to the remarkably fully formed mantra they arrived on the scene chanting", concluding that I Love You "achieves what few debuts can, by making one hell of an opening statement". Caroline Sullivan of The Guardian was critical of the album's "petulant" lyrics, which she remarked were "obviously aimed at teenagers", but concluded that its "dreamy melancholy and high-shine production" and "traditional songcraft" may nonetheless appeal to a broader audience. Irish Times critic Jim Carroll remarked that the band's hooky pop songs, such as "Sweather Weather" and "Female Robbery", can be "ravishing", but felt that the album is weighed down by occasional "fillers".

The album track list appears to have undertaken some edits prior to being released publicly, as Kat Rolle commented on the "late-stage change up" of "How", which appears as the album's opening track.

== Track listing ==
All lyrics are written by Jesse James Rutherford; all music is composed by The Neighbourhood (Rutherford, Zachary Abels, Jeremy Freedman, Michael Margott, and Bryan Sammis) and Emile Haynie, except where noted. All tracks are produced by Justyn Pilbrow and Emile Haynie, except where noted.

No.	Title	Writer(s)	Producer(s)	Length
1.	"How"			5:14
2.	"Afraid"			4:11
3.	"Everybody's Watching Me (Uh Oh)"			3:58
4.	"Sweater Weather"	Rutherford; Abels; Freedman	Pilbrow	3:56
5.	"Let It Go"			3:17
6.	"Alleyways"			4:27
7.	"W.D.Y.W.F.M?"			4:19
8.	"Flawless"			4:06
9.	"Female Robbery"	Rutherford; Abels; Freedman		3:29
10.	"Staying Up"			4:28
11.	"Float"			4:21
Total length:				45:50

UK digital edition (Note: "A Little Death" is placed as track 11 on the album, with "Float" being moved to track 12.)
No.	Title	Producer(s)	Length
11.	"A Little Death"	Pilbrow	3:29
Total length:			49:19

10th Anniversary Edition
No.	Title	Writer(s)	Producer(s)	Length
12.	"A Little Death"		Pilbrow	3:29
13.	"Baby Came Home"	Rutherford; Abels; Freedman	Pilbrow	3:46
14.	"Wires"	Rutherford; Abels; Freedman	Pilbrow	3:13
15.	"Leaving Tonight"	Rutherford; Abels; Freedman	Pilbrow	3:23

Notes

- "W.D.Y.W.F.M?" stands for "What Do You Want From Me?"

== Personnel ==
All credits for I Love You are adapted from the album's liner notes.

The Neighbourhood

- Jesse Rutherford – vocals
- Zach Abels – lead guitar
- Jeremy Freedman – rhythm guitar, backing vocals
- Mikey Margott – bass
- Bryan Sammis – drums, percussion, backing vocals

Technical personnel

- Justyn Pilbrow – production
- Emile Haynie – production (except "Sweater Weather" and "A Little Death")
- Chris Mullings – engineering
- Craig Silvey – mixing
- Tony "Jack The Bear" Mantz – mastering

== Charts ==
=== Weekly charts ===
Weekly chart performance for I Love You
Chart (2013–2014)	Peak position
Canadian Albums (Billboard)	20
US Billboard 200	25
US Top Alternative Albums (Billboard)	5
US Top Rock Albums (Billboard)	6

2022–2026 weekly chart performance for I Love You
Chart (2022–2026)	Peak position
Dutch Albums (Album Top 100)	58
Finnish Albums (Suomen virallinen lista)	37
German Albums (Offizielle Top 100)	93
Norwegian Albums (IFPI Norge)	31
Polish Albums (ZPAV)	33
Portuguese Albums (AFP)	168
Swedish Albums (Sverigetopplistan)	60

=== Year-end charts ===
Year-end chart performance for I Love You
Chart (2013)	Position
US Billboard Alternative Albums	42
US Billboard Rock Albums	53
Chart (2014)	Position
US Billboard Alternative Albums	24
US Billboard 200	171
US Billboard Rock Albums	36
Chart (2022)	Position
Lithuanian Albums (AGATA)	17
Chart (2023)	Position
Polish Albums (ZPAV)	67
Chart (2024)	Position
Polish Albums (ZPAV)	87

== Certifications ==
Certifications for I Love You
Region	Certification	Certified units/sales
Brazil (Pro-Música Brasil)	3× Platinum	120,000^{‡}
Canada (Music Canada)	Platinum	80,000^{‡}
Denmark (IFPI Danmark)	Gold	10,000^{‡}
Mexico (AMPROFON)	2× Platinum	120,000^{‡}
New Zealand (RMNZ)	2× Platinum	30,000^{‡}
Poland (ZPAV)	4× Platinum	80,000^{‡}
United Kingdom (BPI)	Gold	100,000^{‡}
United States (RIAA)	2× Platinum	2,000,000^{‡}
^{‡} Sales+streaming figures based on certification alone.
