= Afraid (The Neighbourhood song) =

Single by the Neighbourhood

from the album I Love You.
- Released: July 23, 2013
- Recorded: 2012
- Length: 4:11
- Label: Columbia
- Songwriters: Jesse Rutherford; Zach Abels; Jeremy Freedman; Emile Haynie; Bryan Sammis
- Producers: Justyn Pilbrow; Haynie

The Neighbourhood singles chronology
"Let It Go" (2013)	"Afraid" (2013)	"R.I.P. 2 My Youth" (2015)

Music video
- "Afraid" (Explicit) on YouTube

"Afraid" is a song by American group the Neighbourhood. The song was written by group members Jesse Rutherford, Zach Abels and Jeremy Freedman, and was produced by Justyn Pilbrow and Emile Haynie. It serves as the second single to their debut studio album, I Love You, which was released on April 19, 2013 via Columbia Records.

The lyrics of "Afraid" can be interpreted in many ways, but it mainly deals with anxiety and depression, hence the lyrics in the hook/chorus "When I wake up, I'm afraid / Somebody else might take my place". The song has been praised by Billboard for its "edgy, subtle hooks".

== Chopped Not Slopped Remix ==
The Neighbourhood collaborated with OG Ron C for the "Chopped Not Slopped" remix of "Afraid". Jesse Rutherford explains that when they "reached out to artists to do remixes it was kind of a weird idea to expand outside of our direct family. Then the idea came up about having OG Ron C take a shot at giving our record his Houston touch. We thought it’d be cool to have someone who, like us, made a name for themselves and their movement in their own way. No one told them they had to slow things down or make purple the color of their culture. They did it themselves. So now black and white is getting some purple mixed in."

== Music video ==
A music video, directed by Ends, was released for the song on October 17, 2013, both in edited and explicit/uncut versions. In the video's premise, lead singer Rutherford was shown in past (teen) and present forms. Rutherford himself was naked throughout much of the video to express his vulnerability and fears, also the eyelids show the different perspectives of everyone in the band, from writing the songs, to playing basketball. The video also incorporated a part of OG Ron C's 'Chopped Not Slopped' remix in the middle of it.

The music video has been met with generally positive reviews. Joshua Frazier of The Michigan Daily writes "'Afraid' is ultimately an enjoyable visual experience emblematic of the typical Neighbourhood experience: bleak, but catchy."

== Chart performance ==
=== Weekly charts ===
Weekly chart performance for "Afraid"
Chart (2013–2014)	Peak position
Canada Rock (Billboard)	11
US Bubbling Under Hot 100 (Billboard)	15
US Hot Rock & Alternative Songs (Billboard)	18
US Rock & Alternative Airplay (Billboard)	5

=== Year-end charts ===
Year-end chart performance for "Afraid"
Chart (2014)	Position
US Hot Rock & Alternative Songs (Billboard)	43
US Rock Airplay (Billboard)	12

== Certifications ==
Certifications for "Afraid"
Region	Certification	Certified units/sales
Australia (ARIA)	Platinum	70,000^{‡}
Brazil (Pro-Música Brasil)	3× Platinum	180,000^{‡}
Canada (Music Canada)	Platinum	80,000^{‡}
Mexico (AMPROFON)	2× Platinum	120,000^{‡}
United Kingdom (BPI)	Silver	200,000^{‡}
United States (RIAA)	2× Platinum	2,000,000^{‡}
^{‡} Sales+streaming figures based on certification alone.
