= Sweater Weather =

Single by the Neighbourhood

from the album I Love You.
- Released: December 3, 2012
- Genre: Alternative rock; indie rock
- Length: 4:00
- Label: Columbia
- Songwriters: Jesse Rutherford; Zach Abels; Jeremy Freedman
- Producer: Justyn Pilbrow

The Neighbourhood singles chronology
"Female Robbery" (2012)	"Sweater Weather" (2012)	"Let It Go" (2013)

"Sweater Weather" is a song by American alternative band the Neighbourhood. The song was written by group members Jesse Rutherford, Zach Abels and Jeremy Freedman, and was produced by Justyn Pilbrow. It serves as the lead single from their debut studio album, I Love You (2013). "Sweater Weather" reached number one on the Billboard Alternative Airplay chart in June 2013, logging 11 non-consecutive weeks at the summit of the chart. Pentatonix covered the song for their 2018 album Christmas Is Here! with an accompanying music video. The song was also covered by Kurt Hugo Schneider, Alyson Stoner, and Max S in 2014.

== Background and writing ==
Zach Abels recalled to Radio.com: "One day Jesse was at my house and I was playing guitar. And he said, 'Hey that's pretty cool, let me record that.' And it just so happened to be "Sweater Weather." When we got done writing the song, when it was all said and done we were like 'Okay this is pretty good we should keep writing songs.'"

"I think 'Sweater Weather' might've been the best song we'd ever written," Rutherford added, "but I didn't think it was going to be the best song we'd ever write. It was kind of like getting a Platinum record, like a little tap on the butt."

== Music video ==
There are two music videos for "Sweater Weather". The original video was released on March 28, 2012, but was later set as unlisted. The second music video for "Sweater Weather" was directed by Zack Sekuler and Daniel Iglesias Jr., shot in grayscale to go with their black-and-white theme, released on March 5, 2013.

== Influence ==
Social media platforms regularly use the song's title or listening to the song as a shorthand for bisexuality, also citing it as a "bisexual anthem". Unpublished Zine said that the song has been made a bisexual anthem due to its exploration of intimacy, the lyrics' relative gender neutrality, the narrator's wearing of "bisexual" clothes, and the association of the song to other music popular on Tumblr upon its release — a time, reportedly, when many users were starting to express their bisexuality.

== Reception ==
In mid-to-late 2020, the song experienced a resurgence in popularity due to it being used on the social media platform TikTok. The song gained over five million on-demand streams on Spotify within the month of November 2020. As of January 3, 2026, the song is the third most streamed on Spotify. In late 2023, for the 35th anniversary of Alternative Airplay, Billboard ranked the song as the 15th-most successful in the chart's history. The song reached 5 billion streams on Spotify on on November 2, 2026, the third song in Spotify history to do so, behind Shape of You and Blinding Lights.

== Personnel ==
- Jesse Rutherford – vocals, drum programming
- Zach Abels – lead guitar
- Jeremy Freedman – rhythm guitar, backing vocals
- Mikey Margott – bass
- Bryan Sammis – drums, percussion, backing vocals

== Charts ==
=== Weekly charts ===
Weekly chart performance for "Sweater Weather"
Chart (2013–2014)	Peak position
Belgium (Ultratip Bubbling Under Flanders)	88
Canada Hot 100 (Billboard)	68
Canada CHR/Top 40 (Billboard)	32
Canada Hot AC (Billboard)	33
Canada Rock (Billboard)	9
Slovakia Airplay (ČNS IFPI)	42
Scottish Singles Sales (Official Charts)	49
UK Singles (Official Charts)	49
US Billboard Hot 100	14
US Adult Contemporary (Billboard)	24
US Adult Pop Airplay (Billboard)	9
US Hot Rock & Alternative Songs (Billboard)	4
US Pop Airplay (Billboard)	7
US Rock & Alternative Airplay (Billboard)	3
Chart (2020–2026)	Peak position
Australia (ARIA)	31
Austria (Ö3 Austria Top 40)	28
Brazil Hot 100 (Billboard)	98
Czech Republic Singles Digital (ČNS IFPI)	16
France (SNEP)	195
Germany (GfK)	27
Global 200 (Billboard)	21
Greece International (IFPI)	2
Ireland (IRMA)	67
Israel (Mako Hitlist)	84
Latvia Streaming (LaIPA)	12
Lithuania (AGATA)	12
Luxembourg (Billboard)	15
Netherlands (Single Top 100)	42
New Zealand (Recorded Music NZ)	34
Norway (IFPI Norge)	37
Poland (Polish Streaming Top 100)	27
Portugal (AFP)	31
Slovakia (Singles Digitál Top 100)	17
Sweden (Sverigetopplistan)	43
Switzerland (Schweizer Hitparade)	16

=== Monthly charts ===
Monthly chart performance for "Sweater Weather"
Chart (2022)	Position
Czech Republic (Singles Digitál – Top 100)	17
Slovakia (Singles Digitál – Top 100)	20

=== Year-end charts ===
Year-end chart performance for "Sweater Weather"
Chart (2013)	Position
US Hot Rock Songs (Billboard)	18
US Rock Airplay (Billboard)	4
Chart (2014)	Position
US Billboard Hot 100	75
US Adult Top 40 (Billboard)	48
US Hot Rock Songs (Billboard)	11
Chart (2021)	Position
Global 200 (Billboard)	65
Portugal (AFP)	71
Chart (2022)	Position
Austria (Ö3 Austria Top 40)	74
Global 200 (Billboard)	34
Lithuania (AGATA)	10
New Zealand (Recorded Music NZ)	49
UK Singles (OCC)	81
Chart (2023)	Position
Australia (ARIA)	75
Global 200 (Billboard)	45
Poland (Polish Streaming Top 100)	56
UK Singles (OCC)	85
Chart (2024)	Position
Australia (ARIA)	87
Global 200 (Billboard)	40
Portugal (AFP)	108
Switzerland (Schweizer Hitparade)	99
Chart (2025)	Position
Belgium (Ultratop 50 Flanders)	177
Belgium (Ultratop 50 Wallonia)	182
Global 200 (Billboard)	34
Poland (Polish Streaming Top 100)	59
Switzerland (Schweizer Hitparade)	69

== Certifications ==
Certifications for "Sweater Weather"
Region	Certification	Certified units/sales
Australia (ARIA)	10× Platinum	700,000^{‡}
Brazil (Pro-Música Brasil)	7× Diamond	1,750,000^{‡}
Canada (Music Canada)	Diamond	800,000^{‡}
Denmark (IFPI Danmark)	2× Platinum	180,000^{‡}
Germany (BVMI)	3× Gold	900,000^{‡}
Hungary (MAHASZ)	11× Platinum	44,000^{‡}
Italy (FIMI)	2× Platinum	200,000^{‡}
Mexico (AMPROFON)	2× Diamond+4× Platinum+Gold	870,000^{‡}
New Zealand (RMNZ)	7× Platinum	210,000^{‡}
Portugal (AFP)	7× Platinum	70,000^{‡}
Spain (Promusicae)	2× Platinum	120,000^{‡}
United Kingdom (BPI)	4× Platinum	2,400,000^{‡}
United States (RIAA)	16× Platinum	16,000,000^{‡}
Streaming
Greece (IFPI Greece)	Diamond	10,000,000^{†}
Sweden (GLF)	3× Platinum	24,000,000^{†}
^{‡} Sales+streaming figures based on certification alone.^{†} Streaming-only figures based on certification alone.

== Release history ==
Release dates and formats for "Sweater Weather"
Region	Date	Format	Label(s)	Ref.
United States	June 18, 2013	Mainstream airplay	Columbia	

== See also ==
- List of Billboard number-one alternative singles of the 2010s
- List of highest-certified singles in Australia
