= Jesse Rutherford =

American singer (born 1991)

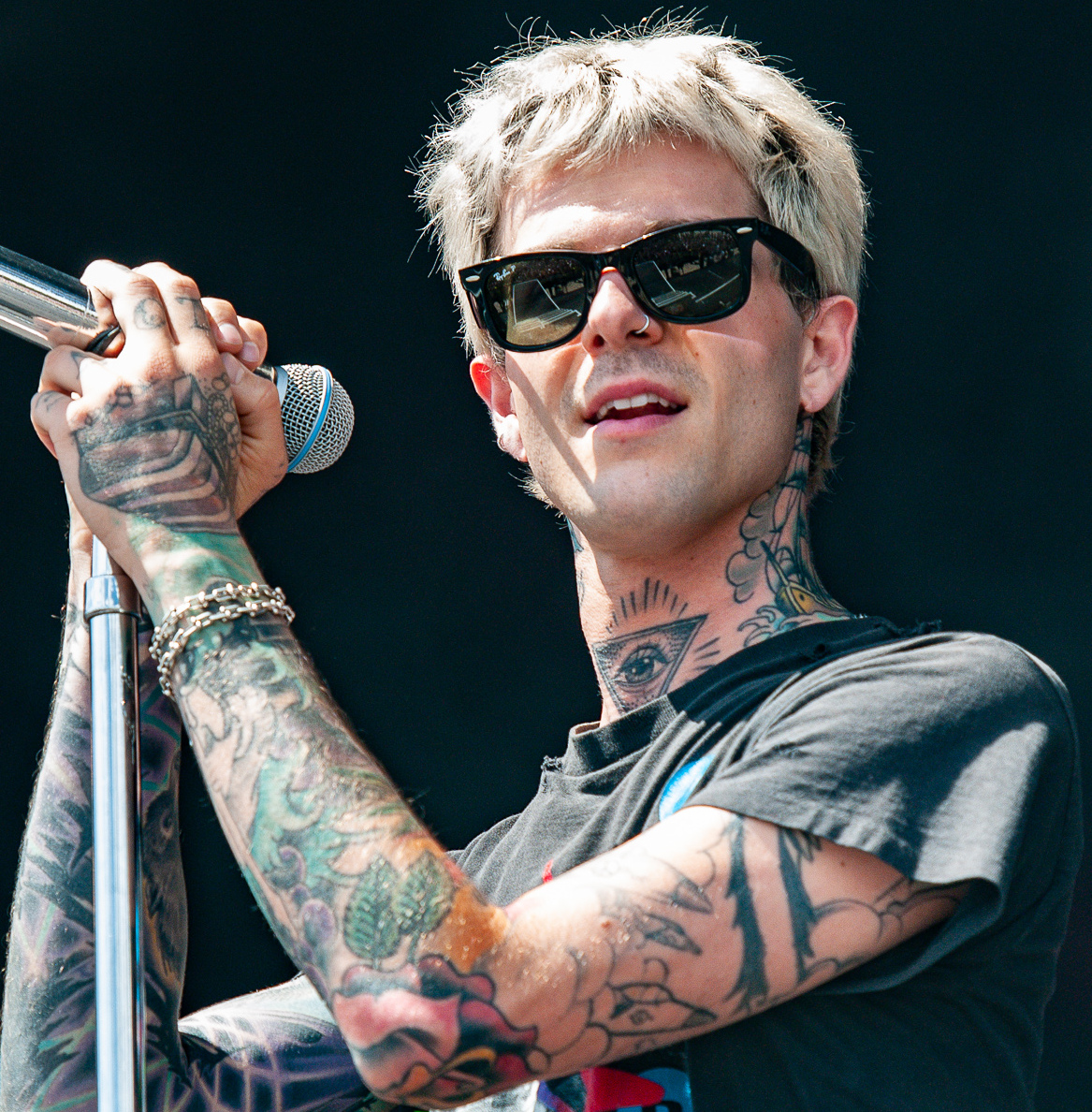
- Rutherford performing in 2018

Background information
- Also known as: Jesse
- Born: Jesse James Rutherford; August 21, 1991 (age 35); Thousand Oaks, California, U.S.
- Genres: Alternative rock; indie rock; pop rock
- Occupations: Singer; songwriter; actor
- Instruments: Vocals; Rapper; Drums; Guitar; Tambourine
- Years active: 2002–2003; 2011–present
- Labels: Columbia; Atlantic
- Member of: The Neighbourhood

Jesse James Rutherford (born August 21, 1991) is an American singer, songwriter, and former actor. He is the co-founder and lead vocalist of the alternative rock band The Neighbourhood.

== Early life and career beginnings ==
Rutherford was born in Thousand Oaks, California, on August 21, 1991. Since he was young, he has been involved in the entertainment industry; as a child, he used to perform in talent shows where he impersonated N'Sync members and Elvis Presley. This passion to perform would lead Rutherford to work in television commercials (such as Hallmark) and in films and television projects such as his role in the 2002 film Life or Something Like It, followed by another role in the 2002 film Bundy. In 2002, Rutherford had also a small television role in the Star Trek: Enterprise episode "Marauders". Throughout his teen years, he was the lead vocalist of multiple local bands.

== Career ==
His first solo project was released in 2011 with a mixtape named "Truth Hurts, Truth Heals". Rutherford combines hip-hop and R&B influences to create the 17 song album. In the same year, Rutherford was connecting with other local musicians when the idea of forming a new band came up. The genre-blending pop group the Neighbourhood was created soon after, presenting a mix of atmospheric indie rock, electronica, and hip-hop beats with melodic, R&B–influenced vocals. In 2012, the band released its first song "Female Robbery" which was followed by "Sweater Weather" off of their debut album I Love You. "Sweater Weather" was a radio hit which reached number one on the Billboard Alternative Songs chart in June 2013. With the Neighbourhood, Rutherford played at festivals such as Lollapalooza (2013) and Coachella (2013 and 2018).

In early 2016, Rutherford released his 144-page book, "&". It features pictures of himself, shot by Jessie English, that explores gender fluidity. Rutherford stated that he used clothes from his own closet, and he shot until he ran out of clothes.

In the same year, Rutherford branched out and began releasing songs on Soundcloud under the name "the Factoury." On November 10, 2017, Rutherford released his debut solo studio album, "&", containing 11 tracks with no features. It was previously announced on November 3, through an article from Pigeons & Planes. On December 17, 2018, Rutherford announced that he was going on his first solo tour in 2019.

On April 2, 2019, Rutherford announced a second solo album called "GARAGEB&", along with its album cover and the tracklist. The album was released on April 12, 2019. The album's name is inspired by Rutherford's rediscovery of his love for writing music as he was trying to fight his dependency on his phone and social media. Instead of using his phone to check his social media, he started using the GarageBand app to make music. Ten out of the album's 12 tracks were made on the app.

In March 2023, Rutherford signed to Atlantic Records and on March 28, 2023, released 'Joker' and 'Rainbow'. This was quickly followed by the release of the &ONE mixtape on August 18.

He began going by Jesse® in 2024. Rutherford released the first single of his new solo career album, "Shoot It Straight" on August 14. Followed by the singles "When I'm Sad" on August 23 and "Thinkin Too Much" on September 6. His third studio album was originally set to be self-titled as 'Jesse®' but was renamed to "Wanted?" days before its release on September 20.

After a three-year hiatus, Rutherford announced the reunion of their band, The Neighbourhood, on the bands official Instagram account. On August 29, 2025, a story was posted on the account stating that they have reunited and are back in the studio making and releasing music together.

== Personal life ==
He dated EDM vocalist Anabel Englund. Beginning in 2015, Rutherford was in a relationship with Devon Lee Carlson, model and co-founder of Wildflower Cases. Together, they were elected "2019's most 2019 couple" by GQ. In 2020, they collaborated with Marc Jacobs to create a Valentine's Day limited-edition T-shirt. It sold out within minutes. In November 2021, multiple sources claimed the couple had split after 6 years of dating. The breakup was confirmed by Carlson in September 2022 on the Call Her Daddy podcast.

In October 2022, Rutherford started a relationship with fellow singer Billie Eilish. By May 2023, they had broken up.

== Filmography ==
Year	Title	Role	Notes
2002	Life or Something Like It	Tommy	
2002	Ted Bundy	I'm Ted Kid	
2002	Star Trek: Enterprise	Q'Ell	Episode: "Marauders"
2003	Dickie Roberts: Former Child Star	5th Grade Boy	Uncredited

== Discography ==
- 2011 – Truth Hurts, Truth Heals
- 2017 – &
- 2019 – GARAGEB&
- 2023 – &ONE
- 2024 – Jesse®
