= Deux cents nuits à l'heure =

Studio album by Serge Fiori and Richard Séguin
- Released: 1978
- Recorded: 1978
- Genres: Progressive folk, symphonic rock
- Length: 44:41
- Label: Sony
- Producers: Michel Lachance, Fiori and Séguin

Professional ratings
Review scores
Source	Rating
Allmusic	4/5 stars

Deux cents nuits à l'heure (Two Hundred Nights Per Hour) is a one-off collaborative album by Québec singer-songwriters Serge Fiori and Richard Séguin, released in 1978. Fiori had taken a break from his progressive rock band, Harmonium, while Séguin's folk group, Les Séguins (with his twin sister Marie-Claire), had recently folded, leaving the two artists free to collaborate on this new project. When the project was first announced in early 1977, it was to be a trio including Michel Rivard of Beau Dommage, then was expanded to a quartet with the addition of Pierre Bertrand (also of Beau Dommage). When Rivard and Bertrand proved unavailable, Fiori and Séguin (who had been composing together and contemplating the project since 1973) set out to do the album on their own.

On Deux cents nuits à l'heure, Fiori and Séguin each contribute a pair of solo songs that they had been working on with their earlier bands, adding three songs that they co-wrote, which they sing as a duet. They are backed by the lineup of musicians that had performed and toured in support of Harmonium's L'heptade (see Harmonium en tournée), all of whom contributed to the musical arrangements. Fiori's Viens Danser got wide FM airplay in Francophone countries, and the album sold over 200,000 copies.

The album covers a wide range of styles and tempos, incorporating many of the sounds and stylings familiar to fans of Harmonium, including extensive use of six- and twelve-string acoustic guitar, flute and saxophone. Instead of the high concepts of Les cinq saisons and L'heptade, Harmonium's last two albums, Deux cents nuits à l'heure is more accessible. Allmusic critic François Couture states "this album brings to a gentle close the heyday of art rock in Québec."

The album won the Félix prize Album of the Year at the first ever Gala de l'ADISQ (sep.1979).

The album was released in CD format in 1991.

On March 28, 2018, Sony Music Canada announced a 40th anniversary reissue entitled Deux cents nuits à l'heure XL, to be released on May 11, 2018. The album was remastered by Fiori and Séguin from a new transfer of the master tapes. Both artists were reunited together in studio for the first time in forty years.

== Track listing ==
=== Side one ===
1. "Deux cents nuits à l'heure" (Serge Fiori, Richard Séguin) – 8:22
2. "Ça fait du bien" (Fiori, Séguin) – 8:31
3. "Illusion" (Séguin) – 7:30

=== Side two ===
1. "Viens danser" (Fiori) – 6:04
2. "Chanson pour Marthe" (Séguin) – 4:26
3. "La Moitié du monde" (Fiori) - 6:34
4. "La Guitare des Pays d'en Haut" (Fiori, Séguin) - 6:14

== Personnel ==
- Serge Fiori – guitar, Fender Rhodes piano, tambourine, lead vocals
- Richard Séguin – guitar, lead vocals
- Neil Chotem – electric piano
- Michel Dion – electric bass
- Denis Farmer – drums, tambourine
- Monique Fauteux - vocals (4 tracks)
- Libert Subirana - flutes, saxophones (6 tracks)
- Jeff Fisher - keyboards (4 tracks)
- Robert Stanley - electric guitar (5 tracks)
- Pierre Cormier - congas (2 tracks)
