= Moog Taurus =

Foot-operated analogue synthesizer

Taurus
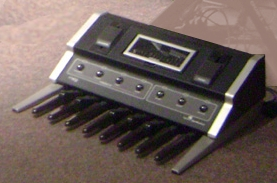
- Taurus I
- Manufacturer: Moog Music
- Dates: 1975–1981 (I); 1981–1983 (II); 2010–2012 (III)

Technical specifications
- Polyphony: monophonic
- Timbrality: monotimbral
- Oscillator: 2
- LFO: none (I); 1 (II, III)
- Synthesis type: analog subtractive
- Filter: 24dB/oct resonant low-pass
- Attenuator: ASR envelope
- Storage memory: 3 preset, 1 user (I) none (II); 52 patches (III)
- Effects: none (I, II) distortion (III)

Input/output
- Keyboard: 13 pedals (I, III); 18 pedals (II)

The Moog Taurus is a foot-operated analog synthesizer designed and manufactured by Moog Music. It was originally conceived as a part of the Constellation series of synthesizers. The initial Taurus I was manufactured from 1975 to 1981; a less popular redesign, Taurus II, followed from 1981 to 1983. Instead of a conventional keyboard, the Taurus uses an organ-style pedal board similar to the pedal keyboard of a spinet organ. This control method was chosen because the Taurus was intended to be played by foot while the player's hands played one or more keyboards, although it was often used by guitarists. While the original Taurus featured its own synthesis engine, the Taurus II was essentially the same as the Moog Rogue. In 2010, Moog issued the Moog Taurus III which closely emulates the analog circuitry of the Taurus I, in addition to adding some modern features.

The Taurus is mostly associated with progressive rock, and has been used by bands like Genesis, Yes, Rush, Tool, and Dream Theater, among others.

== History ==
The Taurus was originally intended to be part of a larger Moog Music synthesizer ensemble called the Constellation. In addition to the monophonic Taurus, the Constellation would have included two keyboards: the monophonic Lyra and polyphonic Apollo. The intention was that the Apollo and Lyra be played with both hands, while bass notes could be played by foot on the Taurus. The sound shaping controls are protected by a removable plastic window in order to avoid accidental adjustments while playing. The Constellation configuration was used prominently on the 1973 Emerson, Lake & Palmer album Brain Salad Surgery. The band also used the Constellation on their subsequent tour, albeit without the Taurus pedal. However, the Constellation was never formally released. Instead, the Apollo synthesizer, designed by Moog's Director of Engineering, David Luce, was redesigned and greatly upgraded to the Moog Polymoog, which was produced from 1975 to 1980; the Taurus I pedal, also designed by Luce, was released as a separate unit from 1975 to 1981. The Lyra synthesizer, designed by Robert Moog, was never commercially released. William Alexander, an engineer for ELP, described the Lyra as "a Minimoog on steroids".

=== Taurus II ===
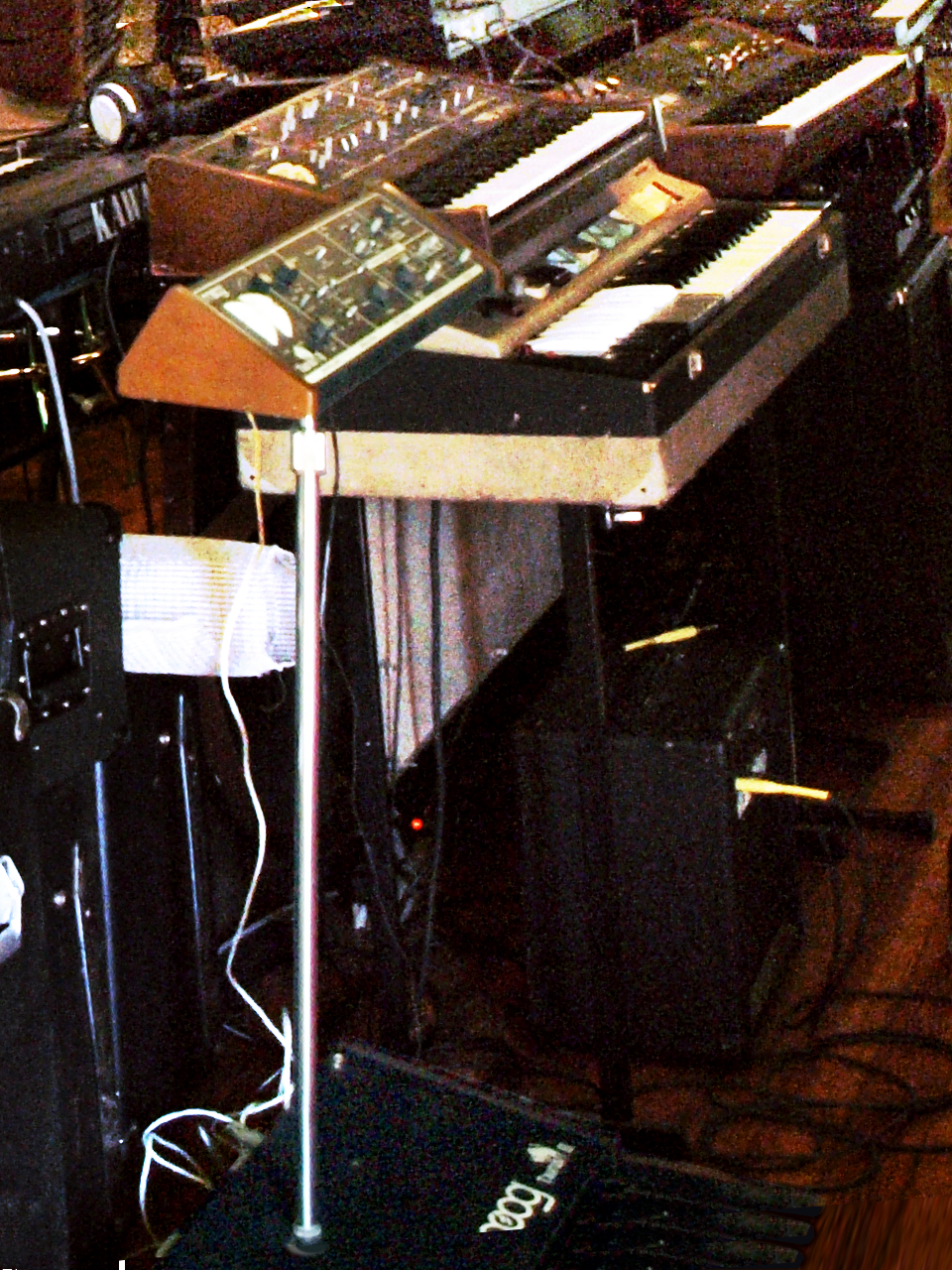
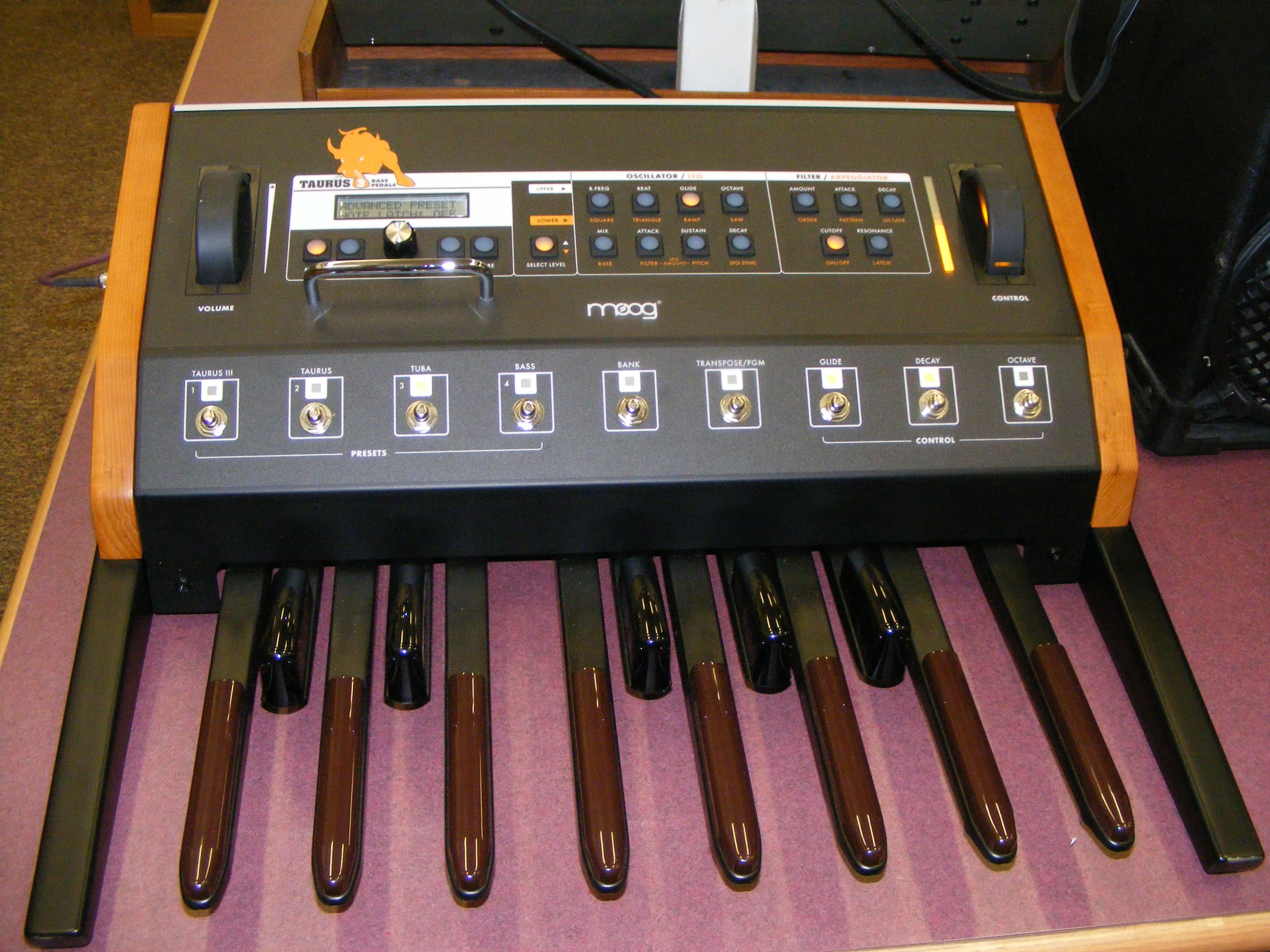
The Taurus II (above) raised the control panel, whereas the Taurus III (below) more closely emulates the original design of the Taurus I.

The original Taurus I was succeeded by the Taurus II, which was produced from 1981 to 1983. The Taurus II uses the same synthesis engine as a contemporary lead synthesizer, the Moog Rogue. The Taurus II was controlled through 18 foot pedals, modulation and pitch bend wheels, and a CV interface. The synthesizer also increased the amount of timbres and effects available. However, the Taurus II had no patch memory or foot controls apart from the pedals. Instead, the control panel was raised so that the player could manipulate it manually during performance.

A version of the Taurus II pedal board with CV & gate outputs and no synth module was available - the model 343C Taurus II Controller.

The value of the Taurus II did not appreciate as significantly as that of the Taurus I; in 2000, Mark Vail noted that the Taurus II was worth only about half as much as its predecessor. In general, the Taurus II is considered to be inferior to the original model because of its different synthesis engine.

=== Taurus III ===
In 2010, Moog released a redesigned version of the Taurus called the Taurus III in a limited run of 1,000 units. According to Moog's creative head Cyril Lance, a reissue of the Taurus had been in high demand since his first convention with Moog, the 2006 NAMM Show, shortly after Robert Moog's death. In 2007, Moog CEO Mike Adams proposed that if customers could generate pre-order sales of 250 units, the Taurus would go into production. Work on designing the Taurus III, led by Lance, began that year after 250 units were pre-ordered. Production ceased in June 2012.

The Taurus III overlooks many of the changes made for the Taurus II, instead more closely emulating the original model. For instance, there is only one waveform available for the unit's two oscillators. Some features are added, such as USB and MIDI support, a larger memory capacity, and velocity sensitivity. The Taurus III also adds an arpeggiator and an LFO.

== Synthesis model ==
The Taurus is monophonic, with its single voice generated by two oscillators running through one three-stage voltage-controlled amplifier. For the Taurus I and Taurus III, only one waveform was available: a distorted sawtooth wave. The Taurus II introduced a second waveform, the pulse wave. All models of the Taurus use a 24db/octave resonant low pass filter with key tracking. Although the early models did not include an LFO, the Taurus III has an LFO that can be routed to either oscillator pitch or filter frequency.

== Notable users ==
The Taurus is well known for its use by progressive rock bands, such as Pink Floyd, Triumvirat, Rush, Yes and Genesis. Harmonium's bass guitarist, Louis Valois, used the Moog Taurus I during the band's L'heptade tour in 1976-1977, which can be heard in the live recording of one of these shows, Harmonium en tournée. Other bands such as U2 and The Police have also used the synthesizer. John Hackett was known for playing the foot pedals of a Taurus with one hand, while using the other hand to change the octave range. Starcastle bassist Gary Strater was known for using two sets on stage. Phil Collins introduced the distinctive Taurus sound to top 40 radio with his hit "I Don't Care Anymore".

According to Moog Music, artists that purchased the Taurus III also included The Black Keys, Todd Tamanend Clark, Animal Collective, Jean Michel Jarre, Steely Dan, Weezer, Dream Theater, Umphrey's Mcgee, and Dave Matthews Band.
