= El Tour Blanco =

2014 concert tour by The Neighbourhood

- Tour by The Neighbourhood
- Associated album: I Love You
- Start date: June 21, 2014
- End date: July 26, 2014
- No. of shows: 26 in total
- Supporting acts: Travis Scott; White Arrows; Bad Suns
- Producer: Live Nation

The Neighbourhood concert chronology
- The Love Collection Tour (2013); El Tour Blanco (2014); The Flood Tour (2015)

El Tour Blanco was the third headlining concert tour by American alternative rock band The Neighbourhood, staged in 2014 in support of their debut studio album, I Love You. The tour title—Spanish for “The White Tour”—reflected the band’s established monochromatic visual identity, which had become central to their branding during the I Love You. era.

The tour began on June 21, 2014, at Malkin Bowl in Vancouver, Canada, and concluded on July 26, 2014, at the Fox Theatre in San Diego, United States. It comprised 26 shows across North America, primarily visiting major cities in the United States and Canada.

== Background ==
Following the commercial breakthrough of I Love You.—which featured the international hit single “Sweater Weather”—The Neighbourhood solidified their reputation for blending alternative rock, R&B influences, and atmospheric production. By mid-2014, the band had completed multiple international appearances and festival performances, positioning El Tour Blanco as a focused North American headline run.

The album I Love You. established the group’s signature sonic palette: minimalistic guitar textures, brooding basslines, and moody lyrical themes exploring youth, romance, and alienation. The monochrome aesthetic—heavily present in the album artwork and music videos—carried over into the tour’s stage production. Lighting design emphasized stark contrasts, often utilizing grayscale projections and subdued strobes to enhance the immersive atmosphere.

== Setlist ==
1. "Female Robbery"
2. "Everybody's Watching Me (Uh Oh)"
3. "Jealou$y"
4. "W.D.Y.W.F.M?"
5. "Baby Came Home"
6. "A Little Death"
7. "Honest"
8. "Wires"
9. "West Coast"
10. "Let It Go"
11. "Lurk"
12. "Dangerous"
13. "Sweater Weather"
14. "Afraid"

== Tour dates ==
List of 2014 concerts
Date	City	Country	Venue	Opening act
June 21, 2014	Vancouver	Canada	Malkin Bowl	Travis Scott; White Arrows
June 23, 2014	Boise	United States	Knitting Factory	Travis Scott; White Arrows
June 24, 2014	Magna	United States	Saltair	Travis Scott; White Arrows
June 25, 2014	Denver	United States	Ogden Theatre	Travis Scott; White Arrows
June 27, 2014	Kansas City	United States	KC Live	Travis Scott; White Arrows
June 29, 2014 (Note: Part of the 2014 Summerfest)	Milwaukee	United States	Henry Maier Festival Park	—N/a
July 1, 2014	Cleveland	United States	Jacobs Pavilion at Nautica	Travis Scott; White Arrows
July 2, 2014	Indianapolis	United States	Old National Centre	Travis Scott; White Arrows
July 3, 2014	Louisville	United States	Headliners	Travis Scott; White Arrows
July 5, 2014 (Note: Part of the 2014 Fair Saint Louis)	St Louis	United States	St. Louis Fairgrounds	—N/a
July 7, 2014	Charlotte	United States	The Fillmore	Travis Scott; White Arrows
July 8, 2014	Raleigh	United States	Red Hat Amphitheater	Travis Scott; White Arrows
July 9, 2014	Washington, D.C.	United States	Echostage	Travis Scott; White Arrows
July 11, 2014	Pittsburgh	United States	Stage AE	Travis Scott; White Arrows
July 12, 2014 (Note: Part of the 2014 Mo Pop Festival)	Sterling Heights	United States	Freedom Hill Amphitheatre	—N/a
July 14, 2014	Nashville	United States	Marathon Music Works	Travis Scott; White Arrows
July 15, 2014	Atlanta	United States	Masquerade Music Park	Travis Scott; White Arrows
July 17, 2014	Houston	United States	Bayou Music Center	Travis Scott; White Arrows
July 18, 2014	Austin	United States	Stubb's Bar-B-Q	Travis Scott; White Arrows
July 19, 2014	Dallas	United States	South Side Ballroom	Travis Scott; White Arrows
July 21, 2014	Tempe	United States	Marquee Theatre	100s White Arrows
July 22, 2014	San Diego	United States	CalCoast Credit Union Open Air Theatre	100s White Arrows
July 24, 2014	Los Angeles	United States	Greek Theatre	100s White Arrows
July 25, 2014	Oakland	United States	Fox Oakland Theatre	100s White Arrows
July 26, 2014	San Diego	United States	Fox Theatre	Bad Suns; White Arrows
