= Harmonium (disambiguation) =

A harmonium, Indian harmonium or pump organ is a reed organ that generates sound with foot- or hand-pumped bellows.

Harmonium may also refer to:

- Harmonium (fictional creature), a creature in the 1959 novel The Sirens of Titan
- Harmonium (poetry collection), a 1923 collection of poetry by Wallace Stevens
- Hooke's atom or harmonium, an artificial helium-like atom
- Former name for a restricted Boltzmann machine, a generative stochastic neural network
- The earliest ringtone maker, released in 1997
- Harmonium (film), a 2016 Japanese film

== Music ==
- Harmonium (Adams), a large-scale work for orchestra and chorus by American composer John Coolidge Adams
- Harmonium (band), a 1970s Québécois band
  - Harmonium (Harmonium album), the eponymous release by the same band
- Harmonium (Vanessa Carlton album), a 2004 album by Vanessa Carlton
- A song by P-MODEL from the album One Pattern
- Harmonium, alternative name for the Appalachian dulcimer

== See also ==
- Melodeon (disambiguation)
