= Juno Awards of 1976 =

Canadian music awards ceremony

- Date: 15 March 1976
- Venue: Ryerson Polytechnical Institute, Toronto, Ontario
- Hosted by: John Allan Cameron

Television/radio coverage
- Network: CBC

The Juno Awards of 1976, representing Canadian music industry achievements of the previous year, were awarded on 15 March 1976 in Toronto at a ceremony hosted by John Allan Cameron at the Ryerson Polytechnical Institute auditorium. CBC Television provided a national broadcast of the ceremonies.

Randy Bachman presented a special "people's award" to Juno founder Walt Grealis on this occasion compared to the lack of mention of Grealis at last year's ceremonies.

Dan Hill performed "You Make Me Want To Be" at the ceremonies.

== Nominees and winners ==
=== Female Vocalist of the Year ===
Winner: Joni Mitchell

- Anne Murray
- Charity Brown
- Suzanne Stevens
- Sylvia Tyson

=== Male Vocalist of the Year ===
Winner: Gino Vannelli

- Paul Anka
- Jean-Pierre Ferland
- Gordon Lightfoot
- Murray McLauchlan

=== Most Promising Female Vocalist of the Year ===
Winner: Patricia Dahlquist

- Lisa Hartt
- Robin Moir
- Shawne Jackson
- Sylvia Tyson

=== Most Promising Male Vocalist of the Year ===
Winner: Dan Hill

- Bim
- Bruce Miller
- Lewis Furey
- Raoul Duguay

=== Group of the Year ===
Winner: Bachman–Turner Overdrive

- April Wine
- Beau Dommage
- Harmonium
- The Stampeders

=== Most Promising Group of the Year ===
Winner: Myles and Lenny

- Aut'Chose
- Bond
- Heart
- Maneige

=== Composer of the Year ===
Winner: Hagood Hardy, "The Homecoming"

- Paul Anka, "I Don't Like to Sleep Alone"
- Randy Bachman, "You Ain't Seen Nothin' Yet"
- Myles Goodwyn, "Tonight's a Wonderful Time to Fall in Love"
- Terry Jacks, "Christina and Holly"
- Robert Léger, "Harmonie du soir à Châteauguay"
- Murray McLauchlan, "Down by the Henry Moore", "Do You Dream of Being Somebody", "Little Dreamer"
- Fred Mollin and Phil Savath, "Santa Jaws"
- Brian Smith and Ra McGuire, "Baby Woncha Please Come Home"
- Gino Vannelli, "Love Me Now"

=== Country Female Vocalist of the Year ===
Winner: Anne Murray

- Carroll Baker
- Susan Jacks
- Patti MacDonnell
- Sylvia Tyson

=== Country Male Vocalist of the Year ===
Winner: Murray McLauchlan

- Stompin' Tom Connors
- Tommy Hunter
- Jimmy Arthur Lodge
- R. Harlan Smith

=== Country Group or Duo of the Year ===
Winner: The Mercey Brothers

- Carlton Showband
- Family Brown
- Four Ways
- Bob Murphy and Big Buffalo

=== Folk Singer of the Year ===
Winner: Gordon Lightfoot

- Stompin' Tom Connors
- Murray McLauchlan
- Joni Mitchell
- Valdy

=== Instrumental Artist of the Year ===
Winner: Hagood Hardy

- Liona Boyd
- François Dompierre
- André Gagnon
- Moe Koffman

=== Producer of the Year ===
Winner: Peter Anastasoff, "The Homecoming" by Hagood Hardy

- Randy Bachman, Four Wheel Drive by Bachman–Turner Overdrive
- Myles Goodwyn, Stand Back by April Wine
- Andrew Hermant and Fred Mollin, "Santa Jaws"
- Michel Lachance, Beau Dommage by Beau Dommage
- Robert A. Morten, Les cinq saisons by Harmonium
- Mel Shaw, "Hit the Road Jack" by The Stampeders

=== Recording Engineer of the Year ===
Winner: Michel Ethier, Dompierre by François Dompierre

- Peter Burns and Nelson Vipond, Les cinq saisons by Harmonium
- David Greene, Canadian Brass in Paris by Canadian Brass
- Mark Smith, Four Wheel Drive by Bachman–Turner Overdrive
- Ian Terry, Stand Back by April Wine

=== People's award ===
Winner: Walt Grealis

== Nominated and winning albums ==
=== Best Selling Album ===
Winner: Bachman–Turner Overdrive, Four Wheel Drive

- Paul Anka, Feelings
- April Wine, Stand Back
- Beau Dommage, Beau Dommage
- Harmonium, Les cinq saisons

=== Best Album Graphics ===
Winner: Bart Schoales, Joy Will Find a Way by Bruce Cockburn

- Marcel Cadieux, Neiges by André Gagnon
- Philippe Fostiss, Récolte de rêves by Séguin
- Colin MacDonald, Rock Me by Charity Brown
- John Martin, Rockerbox by Chilliwack
- Jon McKee, Ready to Go by Downchild
- Allan O'Mara, Bond by Bond
- Daniel Poulin, En Plein Orgasme by Violetti and Ste. Claire Beauregard
- Rush, Fly by Night

=== Best Selling International Album ===
Winner: Elton John, Greatest Hits

- Freddy Fender, Before the Next Teardrop Falls
- Paul McCartney and Wings, Venus and Mars
- Pink Floyd, Wish You Were Here
- Cat Stevens, Best of Cat Stevens

== Nominated and winning releases ==
=== Best Selling Single ===
Winner: "You Ain't Seen Nothing Yet", Bachman–Turner Overdrive

- Paul Anka, "I Don't Like to Sleep Alone"
- Hagood Hardy, "The Homecoming"
- The Stampeders, "Hit the Road Jack"

=== Best Selling International Single ===
Winner: The Captain and Tennille, "Love Will Keep Us Together"

- Carol Douglas, "Doctor's Orders"
- Dickie Goodman, "Mr. Jaws"
- KC and the Sunshine Band, "That's the Way (I Like It)"
- Shirley & Company, "Shame, Shame, Shame"
