= Theatre Under the Stars =

Theatre Under The Stars or TUTS may refer to:

- Theatre Under the Stars (Houston), musical theater company in Texas
- Theatre Under the Stars (Vancouver), musical theater company in British Columbia
