= Louis-Pierre Bougie =

Canadian painter and printmaker (1946–2021)

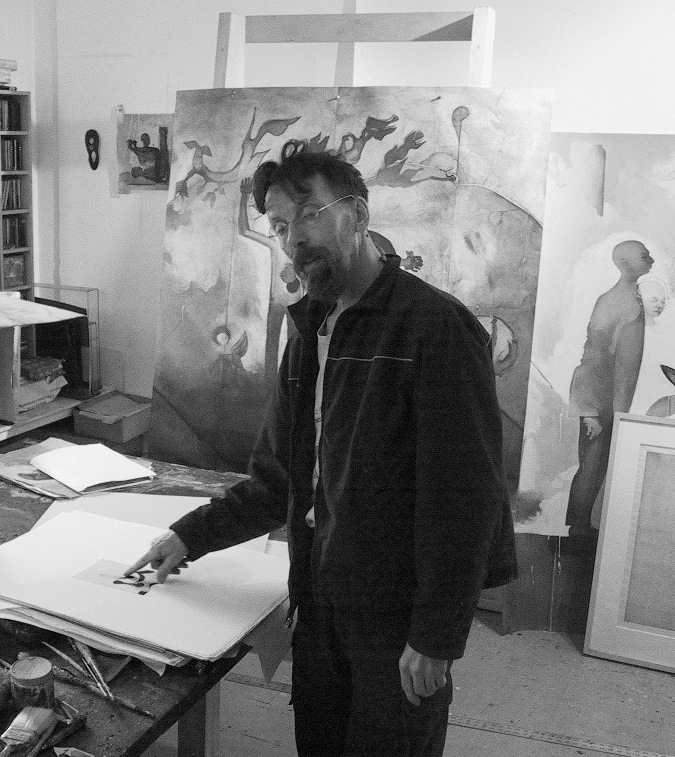
Louis-Pierre Bougie

Louis-Pierre Bougie (16 August 1946 – 10 January 2021) was a Canadian painter and printmaker specialized in engraving and etching. He developed his knowledge of intaglio techniques at Atelier Lacourière-Frélaut in Paris, where he worked for fifteen years, and through travel and study in France, Portugal, Poland, Ireland, Finland, and New York. His work is regularly shown in Canadian, American, and European galleries, and is represented in major public and private collections, notably in Québec and New York. Bougie was considered Québec's foremost engraver for the depth and consistency of his work. He died from pneumonia.

== Training ==
After an introduction to printmaking at École des Beaux-Arts de Montréal, where he attended classes with Angèle Beaudry, Louis-Pierre Bougie studied in Paris, notably at Lacourière-Frélaut (1979–1993), Atelier Rene Tazé, and Atelier Champfleury, and in Vancouver and Montreal. Additional training in Strasbourg (1979–1982), Kraków (1980), Helsinki (2003), and Buenos Aires (2006) introduced him to a compagnonnage-like approach to the transmission of printmaking skills.

- 2006 - Québec artist residency, Buenos Aires, Argentina
- 2003 - Québec artist residency, Helsinki, Finland
- 1996 - Québec artist residency, New York City, United States
- 1992–1993 - Atelier Champfleury, Atelier Lacourière-Frélaut, and Atelier René Tazé, Paris, France, and Atelier Sagamie, Alma
- 1988 - Atelier Lacourière-Frélaut, Paris, France (engraving)
- 1984–1987 - Atelier René Tazé, Paris, France
- 1982–1987 - Atelier Circulaire, Montreal
- 1980 - Studio Lotozowska 3, Kraków, Poland
- 1979–1987 - Cité Internationale and Lacourière-Frélaut, Paris, France (engraving)
- 1979–1982 – Visiting artist, Arts Décoratifs, Strasbourg (lithography); Ateliers Champfleury (lithography) and Lacourière-Frélaut, Paris, France
- 1975–1982- Atelier Luc Nadeau, Montreal, and Baie St-Paul
- 1975–1977- Atelier Arachel (lithography, etching) and Atelier Graff, Montreal
- 1972–1973 - Vancouver School of Art (independent student), Vancouver
- 1969–1972 - Atelier de Recherche Graphique, Guilde Graphiqu, Montreal
- 1967–1970 - École des Beaux-Arts de Montréal (independent student with Angèle Beaudry)

== Work ==
Louis-Pierre Bougie produced a considerable body of engraved and painted works that applied traditional techniques such as burin, aquatint, and chine collé to contemporary printmaking. An heir to Goya, Blake, and Rops, he had developed an original monotype technique that combined engraving with live figure drawing in a reversal of traditional processes: the paper is first drawn with pierre noir and reworked with acrylic before receiving a print from a copper plate marked with spit-bite and drypoint. The finished print captures all elements with exceptional transparency, bringing its subject to light in the true sense of illumination. In Bougie's work, engraving was a process that both opened and sealed spaces. Desire and imagination inhabited matter in unexpected ways, and appearance was literally cast in a different light (through highlights and illumination), giving us back a bit of ourselves.

Bougie also illustrated the cover artwork of several Canadian musicians, including Harmonium's Les cinq saisons, René Lussier's Le trésor de la langue, Le corps de l'ouvrage, Au diable vert, and Le contrat (with Gilles Gobeil), and Conventum's Le bureau central des utopies and 77-79 + Réédition.

== Influence and involvement ==
In the early 1980s, while also conducting residencies at major printmaking studios abroad (including Paris and Strasbourg), Bougie joined forces with Catherine Farish, Pierre-Léon Tétreault, Kittie Bruneau, and other print-based artists to found Atelier Circulaire. Throughout his career, he promoted the work of Quebec printmakers both locally and outside Canada. He also collaborated closely with writers and poets. In 1983, the poets Gaston Miron and Michael La Chance together signed a telegram to Bougie:

We salute Louis-Pierre Bougie, one of those rare souls who is always a step ahead, continuously opening the way to new possibilities and escaping the bounds of mortal time.

As an engraver and etcher of international renown, he has brought greater visibility to Québec printmaking and has been pivotal in inviting printmakers from abroad to take part in major collaborations with Québec, including artist's books, residencies, and exchanges between Québec and other countries. He has also helped foster talent in Québec, both through his work with artists at Atelier Circulaire and as the organizer and curator of numerous exhibitions.

== Selected exhibitions ==
Bougie's work benefited from the support of major curators such as Léo Rosshandler, Bernard Lévy, Céline Mayrand, Gilles Daigneault, Claude Morissette, and Anne-Marie Ninacs.

== Artist's books ==
A significant part of Louis-Pierre Bougie's printed oeuvre involved a dialogue with poetry in the form of collaborative exhibitions and, above all, artist's books that brought together the artistry of typographers, printmakers, poets, and bookbinders. Bougie created books with many poets, among them Gaston Miron, Paul Chamberland, Geneviève Letarte, Jérôme Élie, Michel Butor, Michel van Schendel, François-Xavier Marange, Paule Marier, and Michaël La Chance. Working closely with the authors, he contributed a distinctive sensibility that was both rough and sensitive, abrasive and idyllic. His artist's books were featured in the following exhibitions:

- 1990 – Titre?, Bibliothèque des arts, Université du Québec à Montréal
- 2005 – Titre?, Musée national des beaux-arts du Québec
- 2007 – Actualité de l’estampe au Québec, Grande Bibliothèque, BAnQ (second iteration of exhibition originally presented in Québec City, 2005)
- 2013 - Louis-Pierre Bougie – 30 ans de livres d'artiste, Centre d'archives de Montréal, BAnQ (curator: Claude Morissette)

== Collections ==
- Bibliothèque nationale d’Ottawa
- Bibliothèque et Archives nationales du Québec, Montreal
- Bibliothèque nationale de Paris
- Library of the University of North Carolina at Greensboro
- Musée d’Art Contemporain de Montréal
- Musée national des beaux-arts du Québec
- National Bank of Canada
- Caisses populaires Desjardins
- Groupe Laurentienne
- Provigo
- Loto-Québec
- New York Public Library
- Newark Public Library

== Catalogs and monographs ==
- 2013 - Michaël La Chance, Louis-Pierre Bougie. Espaces chavirés, torsions du désir. Foreword by Isabelle de Mévius, preface by Georges Leroux. Montreal: Les Éditions de Mévius.
- 2007 – Léo Rosshandler, Désert vert. Quebec City: Éditions Lacerte Art Contemporain - Galerie Orange.
- 2005 – Sylvie Alix, Louis-Pierre Bougie: prix de la Fondation Monique et Robert Parizeau 2005. Ed. Anne-Marie Ninacs, with translations by C. Bilodeau and M. E. Elgue. Quebec City: Musée national des beaux-arts du Québec.
- 2005 - Michel van Schendel, Absence de bruit. Quebec City: Éditions Lacerte Art Contemporain - Galerie Orange.
- 2001 - Bernard Lévy, Études au quotidien. With poems by Paul Chamberland and Michaël La Chance. Quebec City: Éditions Galerie Madeleine Lacerte.
- 1996 - Louis-Pierre Bougie, Journal d’exil, New York 1996. With texts and poems by Michaël La Chance, Jérôme Élie, Geneviève Letarte, François-Xavier Marange, and Paule Marier. Quebec City: Galerie Madeleine Lacerte.
- 1996 – Louis-Pierre Bougie, Christine Palmiéri, Espace D. René Harrison, et al., De la monstruosité, expression des passions. Montreal : Jaune-Fusain.
- 1991 - Michaël La Chance, Céline Mayrand, Morsures. Louis-Pierre Bougie Gravures et monotypes 1986–1990. Preface by Léo Rosshandler. Montreal: Éditions Promotion des arts Lavalin, Maison de la Culture Côte-des-Neiges, Atelier Circulaire.
- 1978 - Louis-Pierre Bougie (dessins). Quebec City: Musée du Québec.

== Selected solo exhibitions ==
=== 2015 ===
- UQAC and Galerie La Corniche, Chicoutimi
- Galerie d'art du Centre culturel de l’Université de Sherbrooke, Sherbrooke
- Galerie du Théâtre, Magog
- Galerie d’art Jean-Claude Bergeron, Ottawa
- Galerie atelier Circulaire, Montreal

=== 2014 ===
- Musée d'art contemporain de Baie St-Paul (retrospective), Baie St-Paul
- Galerie Madeleine Lacerte, Quebec City
- Centre d’arts Orford, Orford

=== 2013 ===
- Centre culturel 1700 La Poste (retrospective), Montreal
- Bibliothèque et archives nationales du Québec (30 ans de livres d’artiste), Montreal

=== 2012 ===
- Maison de la culture Marie-Uguay, Montreal
- Bibliothèque de Sainte-Thérèse (retrospective), Sainte-Thérèse
- Galerie Madeleine Lacerte, Quebec City
- Maison de la culture Villeray - Parc-Extension (30 ans de livres d’artiste), Montreal

=== 2007 ===
- Galerie Orange, Montreal

=== 2005 ===
- Musée national des beaux-arts du Québec (Monique and Robert Parizeau Foundation Prize), Quebec City
- Centre d'exposition de l'Université du Québec à Chicoutimi, Chicoutimi

=== 2004 ===
- Atelier Circulaire, Montreal
- Galerie Orange, Montreal
- Galerie Madeleine Lacerte, Quebec City

=== 2003 ===
- Galerie Pierre-Luc St-Laurent, Ottawa

=== 2002 ===
- Atelier Lacourière et Frélaut, Paris
- Galerie Madeleine Lacerte, Quebec City
- Galerie Pierre-Luc St-Laurent, Ottawa
- Galerie Éric Devlin, Montreal

=== 2001 ===
- Calligraphic Centre, Winston-Salem, United States

=== 2000 ===
- Bibliothèque nationale du Québec, Quebec City
- Atelier-Galerie Presse-papier (Festival de Poésie), Trois-Rivières
- Calligraphic Centre, Winston-Salem, United States

=== 1999 ===
- Galerie Eric Devlin, Montreal
- Galerie Madeleine Lacerte, Quebec City
- Centre culturel de Saint-Jérôme

=== 1998 ===
- Galerie Nane Cailler, Lausanne, Switzerland

=== 1997 ===
- Galerie L’Autre Équivoque, Ottawa.

=== 1996 ===
- Galerie Madeleine Lacerte (Journal d'exil), Quebec City
- Atelier Circulaire, Montreal
- La Galerie Trois-Rivières (Festival de poésie), Trois-Rivières
- Centre Culturel Henri Lemieux, Ville La Salle

=== 1994 ===
- Galerie Madeleine Lacerte, Quebec City
- Galerie James Roussel, Montreal
- Galerie L’Autre Équivoque, Ottawa

=== 1993 ===
- La Galerie, Trois-Rivières
- Galerie Michèle Broutta, Paris, France

=== 1992 ===
- Galerie Nane Cailler, Lausanne, Switzerland

=== 1991 ===
- Maison de la Culture Côtes des Neiges (Promotion des arts Lavalin), Montreal
- Susan Conway Gallery, Georgetown, Washington DC, United States
- Michel Tétreault Art Contemporain, Montreal

=== 1990 ===
- Circa, Montreal
- L'autre équivoque, Ottawa

=== 1989 ===
- Aire du Verseau, Paris (France)
- L'autre Équivoque, Ottawa

=== 1988 ===
- Galerie L'Aire du Verseau, Paris and Dijon, France
- Michel Tétreault Art Contemporain, Montreal
- Grand Palais à Paris (SAGA 88, FIAC Édition), France

=== 1987 ===
- Galerie Triangle, Brussels, Belgium

=== 1986 ===
- L'autre Équivoque, Ottawa

=== 1986 ===
- Michel Tétreault Art Contemporain, Montreal

=== 1985 ===
- Délégation du Québec à Paris, Paris, France

=== 1984 ===
- Galerie de l'Université de Moncton, Moncton
- Radio-Canada, Moncton

=== 1983 ===
- Michel Tétreault Art Contemporain, Montreal

=== 1982 ===
- Galerie Jean-Jacques Thibeault, Montreal

=== 1981 ===
- Independent exhibition, Quebec City

=== 1980 ===
- Délégation du Québec à Paris, France
- Studio exhibition, Montreal

=== 1979 ===
- Centre d'art du Mont-Royal, Montreal
- Atelier Graff, Montreal
- Studio exhibition, Montreal

=== 1978 ===
- Musée du Québec, Quebec City

=== 1974 ===
- Balcon les Images, Montreal
- Galerie du Vieux Marché, Ottawa

=== 1971–72 ===
- Atelier Galerie Laurent Tremblay, Montreal

== Artist books ==
- 2013–15 - Ainsi fait, 13 engravings, text by François-Xavier Marange. Montreal-Paris: Éditions de la Griffe d’Acier.
- 2011 - Les mots griffonnés, 12 engravings, text by Michel van Schendel. Montreal-Paris: Éditions de la Griffe d’Acier.
- 2005 - Le jardinier, 17 engravings, text by Michel van Schendel. Montreal-Paris: Éditions de la Griffe d’Acier.
- 2004 - Terre brune, 25 engravings, poem by Michel van Schendel. Montreal-Paris: Éditions de la Griffe d’Acier.
- 2000 - Flou comme la nuit, 7 engravings on chine collé, poem by Geneviève Letarte. Saint-Lambert-Montreal: Éditions Bonfort and Éric Develin.
- 1996 - Rencontres, 16 engravings on Japan paper, texts by Paule Marier, François-Xavier Marange, Geneviève Letarte, and Jérôme Élie. Quebec City: Éditions Galerie Madeleine Lacerte.
- 1992 - Entre deux eaux, 8 etchings and 4 tinted plates, text by Michel Butor. Montreal-Paris: Éditions de la Griffe d’Acier.
- 1992 - Les derniers outrages du ciel, 6 engravings, text by Michaël LaChance. Montreal-Paris: Éditions de la Griffe d’Acier.
- 1990 - Terminus Nord, 12 engravings on chine collé, poem by Geneviève Letarte. Montreal: Éditions Atelier Circulaire.
- 1987 - Forger l’Effroi, 12 colour etchings, text by Michaël LaChance, foreword by Gaston Miron. Montreal-Paris: Éditions de la Griffe d’Acier.
- 1983 - Le prince sans rire, 12 etchings, poem by Michaël LaChance, postface and poem by Gaston Miron. Montreal-Paris: Éditions Lui-même.
- 1977 - Le rendez-vous d'août, 5 lithographs, poem by Raymond Cloutier.
- 1975 - Doux le vent, 5 silkscreen prints, poem by Jean-Guy Charbonneau. Montreal : Guilde Graphique.
