= Pour un instant =

Single by Harmonium

from the album Harmonium
- B-side: "100,000 raisons"
- Released: April 1974
- Genre: Folk rock
- Length: 3:21
- Label: PolyGram
- Songwriters: Serge Fiori; Michel Normandeau
- Producer: Bob Morten

Harmonium singles chronology
"Pour un instant" / "100,000 raisons" (1974)	"Dixie" / "En pleine face" (1976)

"Pour un instant" (meaning "For an Instant" or "For a Moment") is a song by the Quebec folk rock band Harmonium from their 1974 self-titled debut album. Written by band members Serge Fiori and Michel Normandeau, it was released on vinyl as a single in April of that year, along with the B-side "100,000 raisons" (meaning "100,000 Reasons").

== Popularity and legacy ==
The song was extremely popular within Quebec and its success on the radio during the summer of 1974 helped drive sales of the album. According to radio host Raymond Desmarteau, it was often among the first songs learned by new guitarists during the 1970s in Quebec.

The song, like many by Harmonium, has a sovereigntist political message, particularly the following lines: Des inconnus vivent en roi chez moi (Strangers live like kings in my home); Moi qui avait accepté leurs lois (I who had accepted their laws). The flipside, "100,000 raisons" (100,000 reasons), is even more explicitly sovereigntist.

In January 2009, the song was included in a playlist of 49 Canadian songs selected by over 130,000 CBC Radio 2 listeners to help define Canada to the recently elected United States president Barack Obama. In 2010, the song was also ranked at number 3 on a list of the top 100 French-Canadian singles and at number 67 on a list of the best Canadian singles in journalist Bob Mersereau's book The Top 100 Canadian Singles, as chosen by a country-wide poll of musicians, fans, and music industry professionals.

== Cover versions ==
A live cover version of "Pour un instant" was included on Lawrence Gowan's 1997 live album, Gowan au Québec (Gowan in Quebec). In 2006, the song was also covered by singer Catherine Durand for the album Fiori, un musicien parmi tant d'autres ("Fiori: A Musician Among So Many"), a commemorative album of songs written by Fiori and interpreted by various Quebec musicians.
