= Harmonium en tournée =

1980 live album by Harmonium

Live album by Harmonium
- Released: August 5, 1980
- Recorded: June 20, 1977
- Venues: Malkin Bowl, Vancouver, British Columbia
- Genre: Progressive rock
- Length: 85:40 (Note: Album length derived from the 1980 phonograph record edition. Track order and timing changed across formats and re-issues.)
- Language: French
- Labels: CBS; Spalax; Zone 3; Tacca
- Producer: Paul Dupont-Hébert

Harmonium chronology
L'heptade (1976)	Harmonium en tournée (1980)

Professional ratings
Review scores
Source	Rating
Allmusic	4.5/5 stars
La Presse	4/5 stars

Harmonium en tournée is a live double album by Quebecer progressive rock band Harmonium, consisting of a full performance of its third studio album, L'heptade. The concert was recorded on June 20, 1977, at a sold-out event at the Malkin Bowl in Vancouver, British Columbia, during the band's lengthy L'heptade sur scène tour in promotion of the album. The content offered on the double discs was highly edited from the full, two-hour concert, truncating more than thirty minutes of material by removing much of the between-song French and English banter and explanations from Fiori (to a principally Anglophone audience). It also omits five songs from the show: the song "C'est dans le noir", which was performed as the opener on this tour (and not included on the studio album of L'heptade), as well as performances of "Un musicien parmi tant d'autres" from the band's debut eponymous album, Harmonium, and three (including "Dixie (Une toune qui me revient)") from its second release, Les cinq saisons, which were played as encores.

The recording of the concert was financed by the Canadian Broadcasting Corporation / Radio-Canada, which provided the mobile studio. The recording of the show was first broadcast on September 26, 1977, on Terry David Mulligan's CBC Radio program The Great Canadian Gold Rush. A live album was later organized by the band's former manager, Paul Dupont-Hébert, released on August 5, 1980 (after Harmonium's break-up), in Canada by CBS Disques and in France by Spalax Records. In an interview conducted at the time of its release, Dupont-Hébert praised the live recording as being greatly different from the studio version of L'heptade, stating that the songs had been given time to mature and develop by the expanded live band (as opposed to the studio recording which features a smaller line-up and many session musicians) and were presented differently without Neil Chotem's orchestral pieces. However, he admitted that the release was driven by the record company's desire to cash-in on the band's continuing popularity and impact, despite its break-up.

Although founding band member and principal songwriter Serge Fiori had previously hesitated on letting this live recording be released during the band's lifetime, all members of Harmonium finally agreed to sign the required contracts in early June 1980, granting this release to come out officially (contrary to what the AllMusic review falsely states - it also incorrectly states it was recorded during the band's last tour). The album quickly entered Quebec's top-selling charts, spending three weeks on the list and peaking to No. 3 on August 16, 1980, but ultimately sold fewer copies than CBS expected. After being available on phonograph record, eight-track cartridge, and compact cassette for three years (as late as September 1983), the release was left to go out of print by CBS, and was not given a compact disc reissue in 1987–1991, along with Harmonium's three studio albums. The band's former keyboardist Serge Locat later revealed that it was abandoned due to poor sales. The phonograph record edition presented the songs in the order in which they were played during the concert; the eight-track cartridge and compact cassette editions offered them in a different order.

On November 25, 2001, Korean record label M2U Records re-issued the live album on double compact disc in a deluxe gatefold cardboard packaging, as part of its Progdelic series. The release was picked up for major distribution throughout Canada via F.A.B. Distribution. The liner notes notably included the text "Duplication approval from Serge Fiori to M2U Records in Korea," however this was later proven to be false; the cause of a Fiori impersonator who had falsely granted the label permission. Spanish record label Blue Moon Producciones Discográficas also released a double compact disc bootleg (this one packaged in a standard jewel case) as part of its PG series in late 2001. Both of the bootlegs were sourced from vinyl rips downloaded from the Harmonium fan website, harmonium.qc.ca, and not from the master tapes, which were owned by Radio-Canada. The Korean bootleg was described in reviews as being of superior quality (both physically and sonically) to the Spanish one. The band's former members and management, notably Locat and Dupont-Hébert, spoke out against the unauthorized releases to La Presse in March 2002, then engaged in a legal procedure to put an end to the bootlegs.

The amount of publicity and sales the bootlegs received prompted the band and its former management to locate the master tapes from Radio-Canada and CBS (since bought-out by Sony) and issue an official double compact disc version through Dupont-Hébert's record label, Zone 3 (with distribution via Distribution Select). The official re-issue came out on June 18, 2002, in celebration of the concert's twenty-fifth anniversary (though two days early due to the Tuesday Global Release Day industry standard). Fiori, Locat, and Louis Valois (the band's former bass guitarist) spent two weeks in Fiori's home studio in Le Vieux-Longueuil transferring, editing, and re-mastering the tapes for the re-issue. The album re-entered Quebec's top-selling charts, spending two weeks on the list and peaking to No. 13 on June 29, 2002. The release was again officially re-issued on phonograph record, compact disc, and digitally by Tacca Musique (with distribution via Unidisc Music) on March 1, 2019.

== Track listing ==
Credits, track order, and timing are adapted from the album's original phonograph record liner notes. Track order and timing changed across formats and re-issues.

Side one
No.	Title	Lyrics	Music	Length
1.	"Introduction"	Fiori		1:30
2.	"Comme un fou"	Fiori; Normandeau	Fiori; Normandeau	6:41
3.	"Chanson noire" I. "Le bien, le mal" II. "Pour une blanche cérémonie"	Fiori; Normandeau	Fiori; Normandeau; Locat	8:35
Total length:				16:46

Side two
No.	Title	Lyrics	Music	Length
1.	"Le premier ciel"	Fiori; Normandeau	Fiori	20:18
Total length:				20:18

Side three
No.	Title	Lyrics	Music	Length
1.	"L'exil"	Fiori	Fiori	11:33
2.	"Le corridor"	Fiori; Normandeau	Fiori	4:16
3.	"Lumières de vie" (1ère partie) I. "Lumières de nuit"	Fiori	Fiori; Normandeau; Locat; Valois	4:31
Total length:				20:20

Side four
No.	Title	Lyrics	Music	Length
1.	"Lumières de vie" (2ème partie) I. "Lumière de jour" II. "Lumière de vie"	Fiori	Fiori; Normandeau; Locat; Valois	13:21
2.	"Comme un sage"	Fiori	Fiori	14:55
Total length:				28:16

== Personnel ==
Credits are adapted from the album's liner notes.

Harmonium

- Serge Fiori – lead vocals, choir vocals, electric guitar, acoustic guitar
- Louis Valois – electric bass guitar, Moog Taurus, backing vocals
- Serge Locat – piano, organ, mellotron, synthesizers
- Denis Farmer – drums, percussion
- Libert Subirana – flutes, saxophones, clarinet, choir vocals
- Robert Stanley – electric guitar
- Monique Fauteux – piano, Fender Rhodes piano, lead vocals (on "Le corridor"), choir vocals

Additional personnel

- Paul Dupont-Hébert
- Daniel Aumais
- Mario Beauchamp
- Cliff Bonnell
- Robert Cadieux
- Daniel Goyette
- Walter Hellerman
- Pierre Labonté
- Normand Lachapelle
- François Léger
- Rufus Stewart

Production

- Harmonium – musical arrangements
- Paul Dupont-Hébert – executive producer
- Harvey Robitaille – recording engineer, mixing engineer
- Daniel Aumais – recording engineer
- Michel Lachance – mixing engineer
- William Roberto Wilson – design concept, graphic design
- François Chartier – design concept, typography
- Henry J. Kahanek – photography
- Monique Fauteux – photography
- Libert Subirana – photography
- Louis Valois – photography

== Release history ==
Release formats for Harmonium en tournée
Region	Date	Label	Format	Catalog
Canada	August 5, 1980	CBS	Phonograph record	PFC2 80045
Canada	August 5, 1980	CBS	Eight-track cartridge	PFC2A 80045
Canada	August 5, 1980	CBS	Compact cassette	PFC2T 80045
France	August 1980	Spalax	Phonograph record	SPX 6825-26
Korea	November 25, 2001	M2U Records	Compact disc (bootleg)	M2U-1004
Spain	2001	Blue Moon Producciones Discográficas	Compact disc (bootleg)	PG1001
Canada	June 18, 2002	Zone 3	Compact disc	ZCD-2-1012
Canada	March 1, 2019	Tacca Musique	Compact disc	TACD-4587
Canada	March 1, 2019	Tacca Musique	Download and streaming	TACD-4587
Canada	March 1, 2019	Tacca Musique	Phonograph record	TACDLP-4587
