= Ville Émard Blues Band =

Canadian progressive rock band

Ville Émard Blues Band was a Canadian progressive rock band from Montreal, which played a significant role in the development of francophone rock music in Quebec in the early 1970s. They were most noted for receiving a Juno Award nomination for Most Promising Group at the Juno Awards of 1975.

Despite their name, the band was not a straight blues band, but incorporated a diverse mix of rock, jazz and world music influences. A rotating collective featuring anywhere between seven and 25 members at any given performance, the band was led by bass guitarist Bill (Roland) Gagnon and included singers Lise Cousineau and Estelle Sainte-Croix, pianist Pierre Nadeau, percussionists Denis Farmer, Michel Séguin and Christian St-Roch, saxophonists Carlyle Miller and Renald Montemeglio, and guitarists Rawn Bankley and Robert Stanley. Almost all of the members were simultaneously members of other bands, such as Harmonium and Contraction, or session players for solo artists, including Robert Charlebois, Claude Dubois, Franck Dervieux and Renée Claude.

== History ==
The band independently released the demo recording Minute! Ville Emard Blues Band S'en Vient Is Coming in 1973, before releasing two albums, Live à Montréal (1974) and Ville Émard (1975) on the Funkébec record label. They undertook a 30-city tour of Quebec in 1974, as well as playing a show on the Toronto Islands.

The band did not continue past 1975, although the two Funkébec albums were rereleased in 1979 as the double album compilation 2 Disques incluant 2 oeuvres inédites. A new compilation, Complete VEBB Au Complet 1973-1975, was reissued in 2004 on the ProgQuébec record label. The band performed a number of reunion shows in this era, with new members including Kathleen Sergerie, and a 2007 performance in Montreal was released by ProgQuébec in 2009 as the live album Live au Festival des musiques progressives de Montréal 2007.

== Discography ==
- Minute! Ville Emard Blues Band S'en Vient Is Coming (1973)
- Live à Montréal (1974)
- Ville Émard (1975)
- 2 Disques incluant 2 oeuvres inédites (1979)
- Complete VEBB Au Complet 1973-1975 (2004)
- Live au Festival des musiques progressives de Montréal 2007 (2009)
