= Bond (Canadian band) =

Canadian rock band

- Origin: Toronto, Ontario, Canada
- Genres: rock music
- Years active: 1970s
- Past members: Bill Dunn; Ted Trenholm; Gerry Mosby; John Jones; Mitch Lewis; Chris Livingston; Barry Cobus; John Roles; Alex MacDougall; Jim Lamarche; Jeff Hamilton; Kim Hunt; Colin Walker; Brian Mitchell

Bond was a Canadian rock band in the 1970s, most noted for garnering a Juno Award nomination for Most Promising Group at the Juno Awards of 1976. The band released just one album during its lifetime, and had singles with "Dancin' (On a Saturday Night)" (written by Lynsey de Paul and Barry Blue) and "When You're Up" in 1975, but never released another album or had another hit single before breaking up in 1979.

== History ==
Formed in Toronto, Ontario in the late 1960s as Common Bond, the band shortened its name to Bond in 1970. The band underwent frequent lineup changes, with vocalist and guitarist Bill Dunn as the only constant member, while other members included Ted Trenholm, Gerry Mosby, John Jones, Mitch Lewis, and Chris Livingston on keyboards; Barry Cobus, John Roles, Alex MacDougall, and Jim Lamarche on guitar; Dunn and Roles on bass; and Jeff Hamilton, Kim Hunt, and Colin Walker on drums.

The band performed around Southern Ontario before signing to Columbia Records in 1974. Their self-titled debut album was released in 1975, and was supported by a tour as an opening act for The Stampeders. That year they released a cover of Barry Blue's "Dancin' (On a Saturday Night)". The single charted in the RPM Canadian Top 20 that year. This left the band labelled by radio programmers as a bubblegum pop band, and follow-up singles which didn't fit with that perception failed to garner enough radio airplay to perform well on the charts.

The band released one new non-album single, "I Can't Help It", in 1978, but broke up after that single also failed to chart.

The band members went on to play with other bands, including Chilliwack, Doucette, Crowbar, King Biscuit Boy, Zon, The Hunt, The Ian Thomas Band, and Payola$. Lamarche had a brief career as a solo artist on A & M Records before becoming a studio engineer, while Jones went on to become a noted record producer.
