= Malkin Bowl =

Theatre in Vancouver, Canada

Coordinates: 49.298773°N 123.133435°W

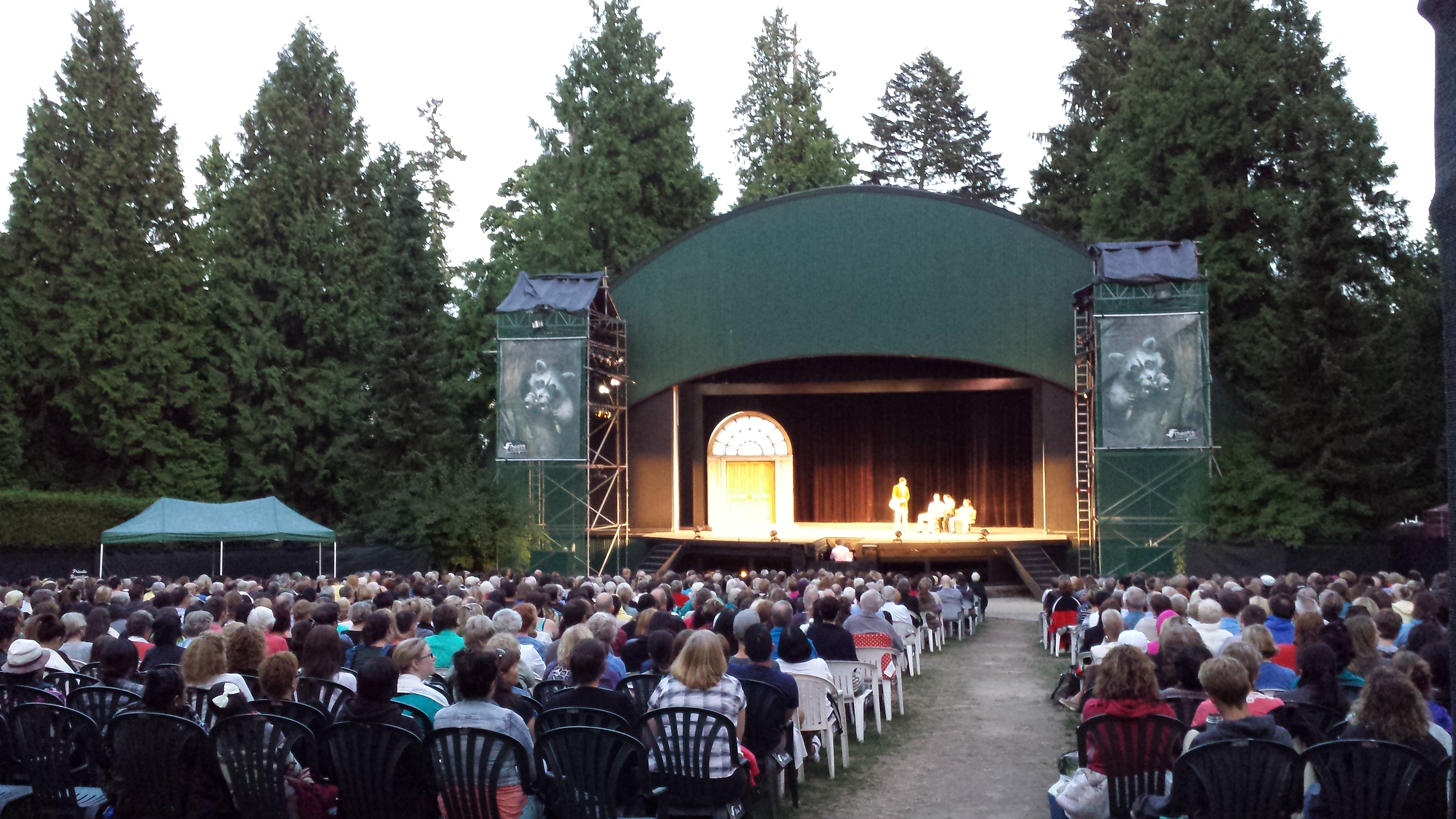
2013 TUTS production at Malkin Bowl in Stanley Park

The Marion Malkin Memorial Bowl, or Malkin Bowl, is a 2000-seat outdoor theatre in Stanley Park, Vancouver, British Columbia, Canada. Malkin Bowl is home to Theatre Under The Stars, which stages family-friendly Broadway musicals there.

== History ==
The Malkin Bowl was built in 1934 to replace a more traditional bandstand which had stood at the same location since 1911. The Bowl was designed as a two-thirds-size replica of the Hollywood Bowl. Allard de Ridder, then conductor of the Vancouver Symphony Orchestra, was largely responsible, along with John Vanderpant, for convincing W.H. Malkin, a former mayor of Vancouver, to build the theatre as a summer concert venue for the orchestra. Malkin endowed the theatre in memory of his wife, Marion.

In spite of the lack of backstage space, in 1940 Theatre Under the Stars began staging operettas and musicals at the Malkin Bowl. In 1950, six productions were held during the summer season.

A live variety show, hosted by Norman Campbell and broadcast on CBC Radio, was also performed at the Bowl during the late 1940s and early 1950s.

Canadian progressive rock band Harmonium recorded its live album, Harmonium en tournée, at the Malkin Bowl on June 20,1977 (released in 1980).

More recently the Malkin Bowl has hosted rock and pop concerts between theatre productions.
