= Serge Fiori =

Canadian progressive rock musician (1952–2025)

- Born: Serge Fiori; March 4, 1952; Montreal, Quebec, Canada
- Died: June 24, 2025 (aged 73) Saint-Henri-de-Taillon, Quebec, Canada
- Occupations: Singer-songwriter, musician
- Instruments: Vocals, guitar, piano, flute
- Years active: 1970s–2025
- Label: Columbia

Serge Fiori (March 4, 1952 – June 24, 2025) was a Canadian musician who was the lead vocalist and guitarist for Harmonium, a progressive rock band from Quebec. After Harmonium broke up, he pursued a solo career.

== Life and career ==
Serge Fiori grew up in the Little Italy district of Montreal, Quebec, Canada, and made his performing debut in the ballroom orchestra of his father George Fiori. At age 18, he was working as a professional musician and beginning to write his own material. In 1972, a friend introduced him to Michel Normandeau who was looking for someone to write the music for a play. Although the project was not completed, the two guitarists formed Harmonium the following year, completing the trio with bassist Louis Valois.

Harmonium recorded three studio albums, adding members along the way to become a progressive rock group: Harmonium (1974), Les cinq saisons (1975), and L'heptade (1976).

When Harmonium disbanded in 1978, Fiori began collaborating with Richard Séguin to record Deux cents nuits à l'heure. This was also Séguin's first album after leaving the group Les Séguin. Most of the musicians from Harmonium appeared on the 1978 LP and again on Neil Chotem's Live au El Casino (1979) which included two new songs by Fiori. After that Fiori moved to Los Angeles to study meditation, computer science, and composition.

He returned to the music business in 1983 as a songwriter for other artists, namely Diane Dufresne, Nanette Workman, and stand-up comic Yvon Deschamps. A year later, he wrote and sang the theme song for the Montreal comedy festival Just for Laughs. He released a solo album, Fiori, in 1986. He spent the 1990s writing film scores (André Forcier's An Imaginary Tale (Une histoire inventée) in 1990, Roch Demers' Hathi in 2000, and Madame Brouette in 2002, with Mamadou Diabaté and Majoly) and television music, making a short set of public appearances in 1995 to present Gayatri, Maha Mrityunjaya, and Shiva, three CDs of new-age music.

After 28 years, he released another solo album, Serge Fiori, in 2014. A tribute to the album was presented by other artists at the Montreal FrancoFolies festival that year.

In 2018, Fiori collaborated with Louis-Jean Cormier on Seul ensemble using new rerecordings of Fiori's songs for a dance and acrobatic show by Cirque Eloize that was presented in Montreal and Quebec City in 2019. A soundtrack double album was also released.

Fiori died in Saint-Henri-de-Taillon, Quebec on June 24, 2025, at the age of 73.

== Discography ==
=== Albums ===
Harmonium

- Harmonium (1974)
- Les cinq saisons (1975)
- L'heptade (1976)
- Harmonium en tournée (1980)

Fiori-Séguin

- Deux cents nuits à l'heure (1978)

Serge Fiori

- Fiori (1986)
- Gayatri (1994)
- Maha Mrityunjaya (1994)
- Shiva (1995)
- Contes pour tous: Mon petit diable (2000, soundtrack)
- Madame Brouette (2001, soundtrack)
- Babine (2008, soundtrack)
- Serge Fiori (2014)
- Seul ensemble (2019)
