= Franck Dervieux =

French-Canadian composer

- Born: January 15, 1931; Paris, France
- Died: April 23, 1975 (aged 44) Quebec, Canada
- Genres: rock, progressive rock
- Instrument: keyboards
- Labels: Columbia (1972); Columbia (1973); ProgQuebec (2012); ReturntoAnalog (2019

Franck Dervieux was a French-born keyboardist, music director and composer who died in Québec in 1975. He began his career as a performer's accompanist, first in France, and then in Québec. He conducted many established artists' musicians, and finally recorded his own album in 1971. His music influenced several Québec musicians and helped define a new Québecois progressive rock sound in the early 70s. His career came to an abrupt end at the age of 44 due to an incurable illness.

== Early career ==
Frank Dervieux, son of a musician father, a keyboardist, and a virtuoso violinist, was trained in the art of playing the organ by his paternal instructor, also serving as the director of the church's choir. At the age of fourteen, he won top honours at the prestigious Conservatory. Subsequently, he enlisted in France's Naval Band, "Musique des Équipages de la Flotte", embarking on a journey that led him all the way to the Far East. After his military service, he got back to Paris. He took the place of the organist at the Gaumont-Palace theatre's grand organ, which had left a lasting impression on him when his parents brought him there as a child. At the time a singer used to entertain the crowd at the intermission. He then had the chance to perform for the Québécois singer Jacques Labrecque, who was on tour at the Gaumont cinemas. His career took off, and he went on to play for the singers Philippe Clay and Fernand Raynaud on stage in France.

== Career in Québec ==
=== Collaboration with Jean-Pierre Ferland ===
During his inaugural tour in 1963, Jean-Pierre Ferland had the opportunity to meet the pianist of Edith Piaf at Bobino. When hearing that Jean-Pierre Ferland was looking for a pianist to work with him in Québec, he recommended Franck Dervieux. Dervieux accepted the offer, and a profound bond of friendship developed between the two artists. In 2012, when Franck Dervieux's album "Dimensions M" was reissued, Jean-Pierre Ferland reaffirmed their enduring friendship, declaring Dervieux to be his dearest companion. Frank Dervieux contributed to the musical arrangements and direction of Ferland's albums Vol. 4 (1965) and Vol. 5 (1966). He also collaborated with several other Québécois artists, including Ginette Ravel and Monique Leyrac, until the end of the 1960s.

=== The Breakout ===
In 1970, during the recording of Jean-Pierre Ferland's album Jaune, the producer, André Perry, decided to call on American musicians to modernize his sound. Since Dervieux came from the European school, André Perry was concerned that he lacked the necessary background to produce a rock sound. Jean-Pierre Ferland's partnership with him ended with the album Jaune, a pivotal moment in Ferland's career.

=== Dimension 'M' ===
In 1971, Dervieux's musical style underwent a profound transformation. He recruited several young musicians and recorded his own album. Musicians who worked with him compared "Dimensions M" to popular acts like The Nice, King Crimson, and Frank Zappa. Some European critics compared his music to that of Camel, Caravan and Gentle Giant. Decades after its creation, music critics still claim "Dimension M" to be one of Québec's most singular progressive rock creations, due to its unique blend of classical, jazz-rock, avant-garde, and psychedelic influences.

His musicians would later form the group Contraction, drawing significant inspiration from Dervieux’s own musical style. He would collaborate with them on Contraction's first album, released in 1972.

== Public Recognition ==
Frank Dervieux's musical skills gained recognition from the public. He was invited to talk about his underground music with musician Claude Dubois on the program "Decibel", which is broadcast on national television (Radio-Canada), in February 1973.

In June of the same year, he won the first prize in the category of best pianist-organist, as voted by journalists and music critics. He was also nominated for Best Composer, alongside Robert Charlebois (winner), Luc Plamondon, Michel Robidoux and Marie-Claire and Richard Séguin, and for Best Album for "Dimension M" with Robert Charlebois (Contraction) and the Séguins.

In 1975 his career was cut short by his illness.

Dimension M was shortlisted for the Polaris Heritage Prize at the 2025 Polaris Music Prize.

== Death ==
Franck Dervieux's album, "Dimension M", remains his only musical legacy. After battling an incurable cancer, he died at the age of 44, surrounded by his family in Sainte-Marguerite-du-Lac-Masson, Québec. His music influenced several musicians and contributed to the development of Québec progressive rock sound. His album was re-released in 2012 and 2019

== Discography ==
=== 1972 Dimension 'M', Franck Dervieux (Columbia) ===
Musicians:

- Franck Dervieux (keyboards);
- Yves Laferrière (bass);
- Michel Robidoux (guitars);
- Christian St-Roch (drum);
- Terry King (electric violon);
- Michel Séguin (percussions);
- Christiane Robichaud (voice)

Tracks

- 1- Dimension 'M' (pour Moebius) - 6:36
- 2- Atlantide (-15,000) - 6:09
- 3- Hyperboree, civilisation 'UN' - 5:09
- 4- Concerto pour des mondes disparus - 8:53
- 5- Orejona mater - 5:34
- 6- Présent du futur - 4:58
