= L'Heptade =

L'heptade
- Original 1976 cover art.

Studio album by Harmonium
- Released: November 16, 1976
- Recorded: June–October 1976
- Studio: Fiori House, Saint-Césaire, Quebec; Tempo, Montreal, Quebec; Son-Québec, Montreal, Quebec; Filtroson, Montreal, Quebec; Salle Claude-Champagne, Vincent D'Indy School, Montreal, Quebec
- Genre: Progressive rock
- Length: 85:18
- Language: French
- Label: CBS

Harmonium chronology
Les cinq saisons (1975)	L'heptade (1976)	Harmonium en tournée (1980)

L'heptade XL
- L'heptade XL's 40th anniversary re-issue cover art.

L'heptade is the third and final album from Harmonium, in which the band made a serious foray into progressive rock. It was released as a double-LP in 1976. It remains one of the best-known popular music double albums in Quebec.

== Album description ==
L'heptade is composed of seven core songs, in order: Comme un fou (Like a mad man), Chanson noire (Black song), Le premier ciel (The first heaven), L'exil (The exile), Le corridor (The hallway), Lumières de vie (Lights of life), and Comme un sage (Like a wise man). These seven songs were mainly written by band founders Serge Fiori and Michel Normandeau. The title, heptade, is the compound of two Greek affixes, hept- (seven) and -ade, which expresses both the notion of group (décade, pléiade) and epic movement (as in Iliad). Fiori mentioned, at the beginning of the live album of L'heptade, that the album, framed in seven songs, was evoking the journey of a man in one day through seven levels of consciousness; a rapid sigh of a man waking up, followed by steps on a cracked wooden floor can be heard in the prologue, the first musical movement preceding the first core song. A man preparing to sleep can be heard in the finale of the album.

Each of the seven core songs includes from two to six different melodies, often with lengthy solos. Serge Locat performs on synthesizers, especially at the end of "Le premier ciel", and on piano in "Lumières de vie". The voice of Serge Fiori's falsetto (head voice), sometimes broken by emotion, creates an emotional intimacy. His singing is often counterbalanced by a chorus formed by well-known Quebec singers of the time, including Beau Dommage's Pierre Bertrand, Les Séguin's Richard, and Ville Émard Blues Band's Estelle Ste-Croix. The signature of Harmonium, that is, the rich sound of the 12-string guitar, still remains the backbone of a few songs, particularly in "Comme un fou" and at the end of "Le corridor". But L'heptade offers a more sophisticated music than in the past. Lush arrangements, creative use of piano, electric piano, and synthesizers, and the sophistication of the melodies are some elements that set this album as full-fledged progressive rock.

The other musical titles listed on the album represent musical interludes of classical, minimalist signature. These interludes are the result of the collaboration between Fiori and classical music composer and teacher Neil Chotem, and are played either by a single synthesizer or with the Montreal Symphony Orchestra.

The lyrics of the album are mainly based around the personal, inner conflict of the main character. A major theme, recurring in all songs of the album, is the antithesis of the world: the Black and White, the Light and Darkness, the Day and Night. The struggle to unite these antitheses, which the lyrics in the first disc of the double-album, suggest is the source of the character's internal conflict, leads to the realization in the second disc that these antitheses can be overcome through love, but that true appreciation of love appears to be possible only with an uplifting mind. In the original cover of the album, the only printed lyrics were a section of "Lumières de vie", where the character begs to be spoken of love in order to overcome both nights and days (...Lumières de vie... parle-moi d'amour, assez pour éclipser les deux [la nuit, le jour] pour toujours).

Michel Normandeau, the co-founder of Harmonium, left the band at the beginning of the recording of L'heptade. He thus appears only as contributing to the guitar playing of the first song, but he contributed to writing five of the seven songs.

== Production and performance ==
L'heptade was recorded in a country house belonging to the Fiori family, in Saint-Césaire. The creaking of the old floor can sometimes be heard on the recordings. At $90,000, the production of L'heptade was, at the time, the most expensive ever in the Quebec music industry. While a large part of this amount was provided by a new contract signed with CBS, the musicians still had to contribute to the financing of the production. The album was released in 1976.

During the long tour supporting this album, Harmonium was recorded performing in Vancouver which was later edited and published under the name Harmonium en tournée.

The original matrix of the album was thought to have been damaged by a flood in the offices of CBS. As a consequence, the 1990 CD reissue was done from a vinyl record. However these tapes were later found undamaged and a remixing and remastering project was done by Serge Fiori and Louis Valois and released as L'heptade XL in November 2016. It was released as l'Heptade XL on November 18, 2016, to mark its fortieth anniversary. For the occasion, a new song, called C'est dans le noir, which was recorded at the National Arts Centre in Ottawa during the original tour for the album, has been released on iTunes.

On June 23, 2008, as part of St. Jean Baptiste Day celebrations, Gregory Charles, the Laval Symphony Orchestra, the World Choir, and several singers performed a re-orchestrated version of L'heptade in Laval, Quebec. Charles had collaborated with Neil Chotem prior to the latter's death.

== Reception ==
Professional ratings
Review scores
Source	Rating
Allmusic	link

The album was (and still is) one of the best-selling double albums in the history of Quebec popular music, selling over 100,000 copies after a few months. Nevertheless, at the time, it had less impact in Quebec than the two previous albums, because of the not-radio-friendly lengthy songs and the sophisticated melodies. Critics largely offered a warm reception to the album, particularly in the world of progressive rock, where it was praised well outside the borders of Quebec. Harmonium was invited to tour with Supertramp in Europe.

L'heptade's popularity grew in the Quebec musical scene, and the album has sold over 400,000 copies since its release.

At the 2017 Polaris Music Prize, the album won the public vote for the Heritage Prize in the 1976-1985 category.

== Track listing ==
Credits are adapted from the album's liner notes.

Side one
No.	Title	Lyrics	Music	Length
1.	"Prologue"		Chotem	4:20
2.	"Comme un fou"	Fiori; Normandeau	Fiori; Normandeau	7:50
3.	"Sommeil sans rêves"		Chotem	1:25
4.	"Chanson noire I. Le bien, le mal (Fiori) II. Pour une blanche cérémonie (Fiori, Normandeau, Locat)"	Fiori; Normandeau	Fiori; Normandeau; Locat	8:12 3:39 4:32
Total length:				21:47

Side two
No.	Title	Lyrics	Music	Length
1.	"L'appel"		Chotem	0:12
2.	"Le premier ciel"	Fiori; Normandeau	Fiori	11:09
3.	"Sur une corde raide"		Chotem	0:16
4.	"L'exil"	Fiori	Fiori	12:38
Total length:				24:15

Side three
No.	Title	Lyrics	Music	Length
1.	"Le corridor"	Fiori; Normandeau	Fiori	6:40
2.	"Les premières lumières"		Chotem	1:30
3.	"Lumières de vie I. Lumières de nuit (Fiori, Normandeau) II. Éclipse (Chotem) III. Lumière de jour (Locat) IV. Lumière de vie (Fiori, Locat, Valois)"	Fiori	Fiori; Normandeau; Locat; Valois; Chotem	14:11 6:59 1:27 3:09 2:38
Total length:				22:21

Side four
No.	Title	Lyrics	Music	Length
1.	"Prélude d'amour"		Chotem	0:41
2.	"Comme un sage"	Fiori	Fiori	13:23
3.	"Épilogue"		Chotem	2:50
Total length:				16:55

== Personnel ==
Credits are adapted from the album's liner notes and reflect the band's membership at the time it was recorded and released (several session members subsequently joined the band as full members). Normandeau was a member at the beginning of the recording session but departed before it was completed. Fiori stated during an interview that L'heptade was recorded while the band was a four-piece.

Harmonium

- Serge Fiori – lead vocals, choir vocals, twelve-string electric guitar, twelve-string acoustic guitar, six-string electric guitar, six-string acoustic guitar
- Louis Valois – bass guitar, Yamaha organ, Fender Rhodes piano
- Serge Locat – electric piano, piano, Yamaha organ, pipe organ, mellotron, synthesizer
- Denis Farmer – drums, percussion, congas

Additional musicians

- Michel Normandeau – six-string acoustic guitar
- Robert Stanley – six-string electric guitar
- Libert Subirana – alto flute, electric alto flute, soprano flute, alto saxophone, clarinet, bass clarinet
- Neil Chotem – piano, Fender Rhodes piano, synthesizer, celesta
- Anthony Chotem – classical guitar
- Michel Lachance – tambourine
- Calvin Sieb – first violin
- Jack Cantor – first cello
- Jeanne Baxtresser – flute
- Peter Bowman – oboe
- Dorothy E. Masella – harp
- Louis Charbonneau – percussion
- Monique Fauteux – lead vocals (on "Le corridor"), choir vocals
- Estelle Ste-Croix – choir vocals
- Pierre Bertrand – choir vocals
- Richard Séguin – choir vocals

Production

- Harmonium – musical arrangements
- Michel Lachance – producer, mixing engineer, recording engineer, musical arrangements, musical direction
- Neil Chotem – orchestra conductor, orchestral arrangements, musical arrangements
- Serge Fiori – musical direction
- Louis Valois – musical direction
- H. Perrot – mixing engineer
- Nelson Vipond – additional recording engineer
- John Williams – CBS management and artistic direction
- Paul Dupont-Hébert – management and artistic direction
- Michel Normandeau – layout design
- Robert Lussier – layout design, photography
- Dave Tailon – photography
- Danielle Arsenault – photography

== Certifications ==
Region	Certification	Certified units/sales
Canada (Music Canada)	4× Platinum	400,000^{^}
^{^} Shipments figures based on certification alone.
