= Melodion =

Melodion may refer to:

- Melodion (friction instrument), a type of 19th century friction key instrument
- Melodion, a brand of melodica produced by Suzuki

== See also ==
- Melodeon (disambiguation)
