= Kathleen (singer) =

Kathleen Sergerie
- Born: Cap-Chat, Quebec, Canada
- Occupation: Singer

Kathleen Sergerie, known professionally as Kathleen, is a Canadian pop singer from Quebec, who records only under her first name. She released several albums and scored hits on the Canadian charts in the early 1990s with songs such as "Où aller" and "Ça va bien!"

Her 1993 album Ça va bien! was written and produced by Jean-Pierre Isaac.

As of 2006, she joined with the Ville Émard Blues Band and performed in Montreal. Although she has not released a solo album since 1996, she told the newspaper L'Avantage gaspésien in 2017 that she was beginning work on her fourth album.

== Discography ==
- Kathleen (1991)
- Ça va bien! (1993)
- Cette fille-Là (1996)
