= Melodeon =

Melodeon may refer to:

- Melodeon (accordion), a type of button accordion
- Melodeon (organ), a type of 19th-century reed organ
- Melodeon (Boston, Massachusetts), a concert hall in 19th-century Boston
- Melodeon Records, a U.S. record label in the 1960s
- The Melodeon, a 1977 novel by Glendon Swarthout

== See also ==
- Foster Hall (Indianapolis, Indiana) or Melodeon Hall
- Harmonium (disambiguation)
- Melodion (disambiguation)
