= Catherine Farish =

Canadian artist

- Born: 1951 (age 74–75); London, England
- Known for: Printmaker
- Awards: Grand Prize, Loto-Quebec (1992)
- Elected: Royal Canadian Academy of Arts (2008)
- Website: Artist website

Catherine Farish RCA (born 1951) is a Canadian artist known for experimental, contemporary printmaking. Elected to the Royal Canadian Academy of Arts in 2008, her large-format work unites "the discipline of engraving, free use of the plastic arts and the expressive force of lyric abstraction." Described as "one of Quebec's most innovative contemporary printmakers", she was awarded the 1992 Grand Prize, Loto-Quebec (1992), Montreal Acquisition Award (1992), and Boston Printmakers' Material Award (1997). Her work is found in the collections of the Musée national des beaux-arts du Québec, Bibliothèque et Archives nationales du Québec, and the Canada Council for the Arts Art Bank.

== Education and career ==
Catherine Farish was born in 1951 in London, England. Her father was British-Canadian, her mother Italian, and her family resettled in Montreal, Canada, during the mid-1950s. She received a diploma in Fine Arts from the Montreal Museum of Fine Arts School in 1976 and a Bachelor of Fine Arts (cum laude) from Concordia University in 1983. A founding member of the Montreal print collective Atelier Circulaire, she studied with master printer François-Xavier Marange in 1986. Her early work was figurative and a print inspired by Leonard Cohen's poem "Gift" was awarded Grand Prize in a 1992 Loto-Quebec competition. In 1994 Farish's first abstract exhibition, Salisbury Plain at Galerie Simon Blais (Montreal), drew positive reviews in Voir, and Parcours Arts Visuels. Solo shows followed at Open Studio (Toronto), Galeriwan (Kuala Lumpur, Malaysia), Hope Corman Gallery (Victoria BC), Autre Équivoque (Ottawa ON), and at Cynthia Reeves' Spheris Gallery (Walpole NH). By 1997 Farish had replaced the central subject with multiple elements in the series Primo pensiero exhibited at Galerie Simon Blais. She also participated in the international group exhibitions: The Levee: Where the Blues Began shown in Canada, the United States, South Africa, Japan, and Korea; Veille at Bibliothèque nationale du Québec in Montreal, at the Boston Printmakers 50th Anniversary Exhibition, and at Galerie Echancrure in Brussels, Belgium.

Following an art residency at Asilah, Morocco, Farish adopted a North African palette of vermillion and orange. This new work was exhibited in 2001 as Dépaysment at Galerie Simon Blais, and the following year as Persimmon Prints at Spheris Gallery in New York City and Walpole, New Hampshire. In 2007 she exhibited with Louis-Pierre Bougie and François Vincent at Atelier Circulaire's 25th anniversary show where an interest in Asian calligraphy was noted. In 2009 she began to experiment with player piano rolls as surface and theme which led to the solo exhibitions Notes in 2011 and Blue in 2015 at Galerie Simon Blais. That year Farish's series of circular compositions Many Moons was exhibited at Cynthia-Reeves' New Hampshire gallery and at 2016 Pulse New York. In 2017 her Salisbury Plain series was exhibited at the UK Salisbury International Arts Festival. She was also selected by the UK multimedia project Cicatrix to represent Canada in the 2018 WW1 commemorative exhibition at the Swindon Art Gallery and Museum. In 2016 Farish lived and worked near Montreal, Quebec.

== Technique ==
Farish's multi-layer monotypes and prints are characterized by "luminous tones and contrasts surgically presented within mixed media: etching on copper and cardboard, collage with Chinese paper, drawing or added pigment." Created through multiple runs with found objects used as plates or as collage materials, she works in stages. Following an initial idea or primo pensiero, Farish makes plates from found objects, such as recycled cardboard or pieces of discarded steel, which is then marked or manipulated. She prints on Arches paper and works intuitively, often layering and mounting printed handmade paper, washi, as one-of-a-kind works of art. Her method of working allows her to develop "variations inside a compositional frame" for each series: Salisbury Plain (1993–1994), Primo pensiero (1995–1997), Dépaysement (2000–2001), Persimmon Prints (2002), Esquisse païenne (2004) et Territoires intimes (2006), Piano Roll Project (2009–2011). Likened to maps, topographies and aerial views, her prints "parallel the processes of continuous change and transformation we see in our environment". In the journal Vie des arts Bernard Levy describes her work as autobiographical and an exploration of space and time: "The space filled with familiar objects, streets, countryside, a wall, the roof of a house... the time imposed by History".

== Recognition ==
Elected to the Royal Canadian Academy of Arts in 2008, Farish is recognized for "her own unique visual lexicon" and experimental technique. In Art New England, Craig Stockwell wrote: Farish's process is "spontaneous and intuitive: things are torn, tried, painted, added, subtracted, but the surfaces of the works are seamless." For Elissa Barnard of The Halifax Chronicle Herald: "The rust and pale gold works, artfully composed in scrawling lines, letter-shapes and splotches, are like ancient maps one keeps exploring". Art critic Robert Enright described within her work "restrained tonal reductions of artists like Robert Motherwell and Joseph Beuys". Vie des arts reviewer André Seleanu noted Zen-like "qualities that seem diametrically opposed: an intense emotion rendered by warm colors (ochres, carmines, red brick and blood) coexist with a tranquility created by flat areas of white and gray." Dorota Kozinska reviewed her work as: "Elegant, abstract works on paper... converse in a quiet language of mixed media," to conclude: "A highly intuitive artist, Farish allows the image to form itself, a tiny gesture at a time, one small step after another, only to finish it with the audacity and assurance of a master printer."

Described in Quebec Culture magazine as "one of Québec's most innovative contemporary printmakers", Farish is "known for having perfected many collograph techniques including carborundum, acrylic textured mediums, and for using nontraditional surfaces and found objects." Early in her career, Farish worked with François-Xavier Marange at Atelier Circulaire on experimental processes such as drawing on Chine-collé, as well as collage with printed, torn, or crumbled traditional handmade paper or washi. In 2008 she was elected to and exhibited with the Royal Canadian Academy of Arts. In 2010 she became a resident fellow at the Ballinglen Arts Foundation in Ballycastle, Ireland, and was a 2014 artist-in-resident at St. Michael's Printshop in St. John's, Newfoundland. In 2013, under Québec's Integration of Art and Architecture Program, she was awarded commissions for two public-work installations, including one at Cégep de Sherbrooke. An educator, Farish taught printmaking and drawing at the National Theatre School of Canada (1995–2011) in Montreal, and at the Great River Arts Institute in Walpole, Vermont. In 2013 she curated an exhibition of prints by François-Xavier Marange at Atelier Circulaire. In 2017 she was an instructor at the Ballinglen Arts Foundation in Ballycastle, Ireland.
