= White Arrows =

American psych-pop group

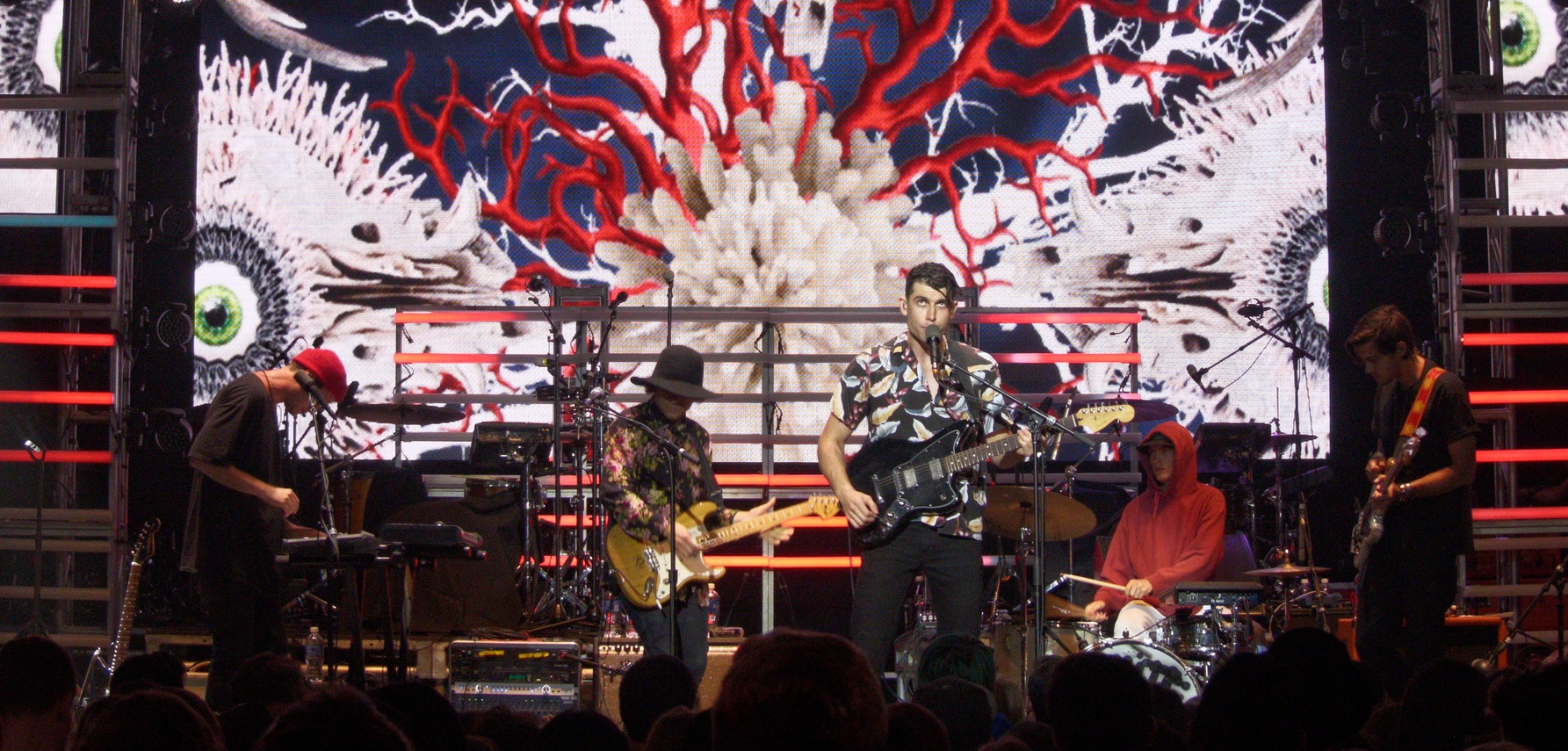
- White Arrows performing live at the VMAs "Artist to Watch" Concert at the Avalon Theatre in 2014

Background information
- Origin: Los Angeles, California, United States
- Genres: Dance-rock, psychedelic pop, indie rock
- Labels: Votiv, Dew-Process, Ooh La La Records (past)
- Members: Mickey Schiff; Andrew Naeve; John Paul Caballero; Steven Vernet
- Website: www.whitearrows.com

White Arrows is a psych-pop group from Los Angeles, California. The band consists of Mickey Church, Andrew Naeve, John Paul Caballero, and Steven Vernet. They formed in 2011.

== History ==
White Arrows, a psychedelic pop band, began on a whim when writing a song in New York City that immediately got attention from blogs including Nylon magazine. Mickey never thought of being in a band or playing music before this, but after getting such immediate attention it was difficult to not take advantage. Soon thereafter, Mickey took the name to Los Angeles to form the band with Andrew Naeve, John Paul Caballero, and Steven Vernet. Mickey and Andrew began writing, producing and remixing music together. Not long after, White Arrows began touring the world. Since their debut tour with Cults, they have toured with many other bands, including White Denim, The Naked and Famous, !!!, Santigold and The Neighbourhood.

== Band members ==
Current Members

- Mickey Church – vocals, guitar
- Andrew Naeve – guitar, keys
- John Paul Caballero – guitar, keys
- Steven Vernet - bass
- Jake Kay - drums

Past Members

- Rob Banks
- Steven Vernet

== Discography ==
Get Gone 7" (2011)

- Released by Brooklyn-based Ooh La La Records in September 2011.

Dry Land Is Not A Myth (2012) After having RAC do a mix of their song Coming Or Going, White Arrows asked him to produce their entire debut album with band member Andrew Naeve. White Arrows debut LP, "Dry Land Is Not A Myth," came out on June 19, 2012, on Votiv, a Seattle-based record label, and Dew-Process in Australia. White Arrows toured across three continents and ten countries in support of "Dry Land Is Not A Myth." Their 2013 Coachella performance was named one of Spin's "Underdog's to Watch" and a "Top 20 Moment"

Track list:

1. Roll Forever (3:38)
2. Get Gone (3:59)
3. Coming Or Going (3:01)
4. I Can Go (3:22)
5. Golden (2:59)
6. Little Birds (3:47)
7. Sail On (3:07)
8. Getting Lost (3:58)
9. Settle Down (2:51)
10. Fireworks of the Sea (2:37)

In Bardo, released September 16, 2014.

Track list:

1. I Want A Taste (4:14)
2. We Can't Ever Die (3:21)
3. Nobody Cares (4:34)
4. Can't Stop Now (3:10)
5. Scream (3:29)
6. Leave It Alone (3:21)
7. Get By (3:48)
8. Devil's Chimes (4:29)
9. Chill Winston (3:47)
10. God Alert, Pt. 1 (3:18)
11. God Alert, Pt. 2 (3:15)

== Music videos ==
- Get Gone
- Fireworks of the Sea
- Little Birds

== Remixes ==
- Local Natives
- Alexander Ebert (of Edward Sharpe and the Magnetic Zeros)
- Active Child
