= Theatre Under the Stars (Vancouver) =

Theatre organization in Vancouver

Theatre Under The Stars Musical Society
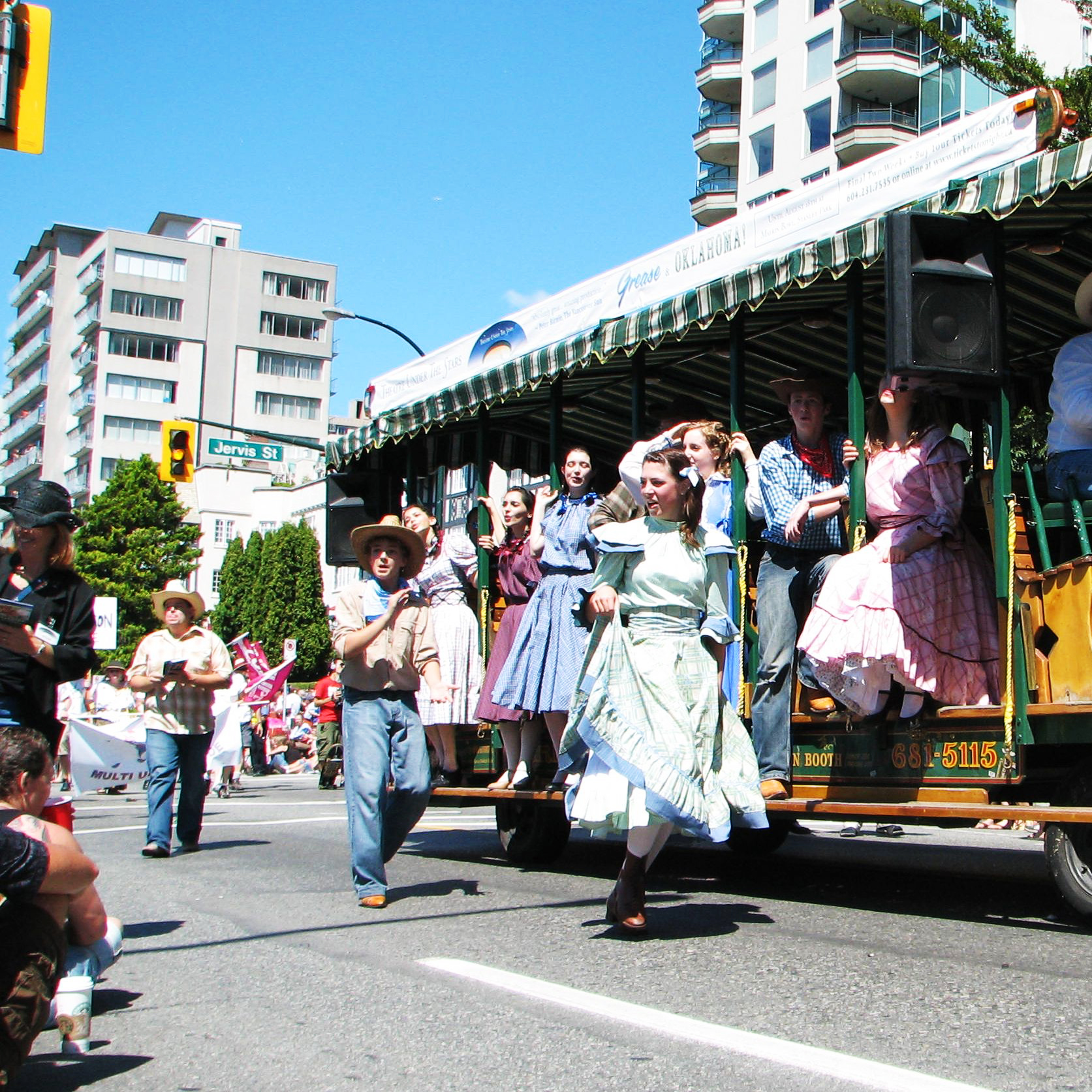
- TUTS at the Vancouver Pride Festival, 2007
- Formation: 1940
- Type: Theatre group
- Location: Stanley Park
- Website: tuts.ca

Theatre Under The Stars, commonly referred to as TUTS, is a not-for-profit charitable organization and one of the largest musical theatre companies in Vancouver. It is officially operated by the Theatre Under The Stars Musical Society, and presents two full length musicals during the summer season at Malkin Bowl in Stanley Park. In addition, the company participates in other park activities in association with the Vancouver Park Board such as their annual Sing-A-Long. The society also operates the Malkin Bowl venue and routinely rents it to Live Nation Entertainment for the summer concert series.

== History ==
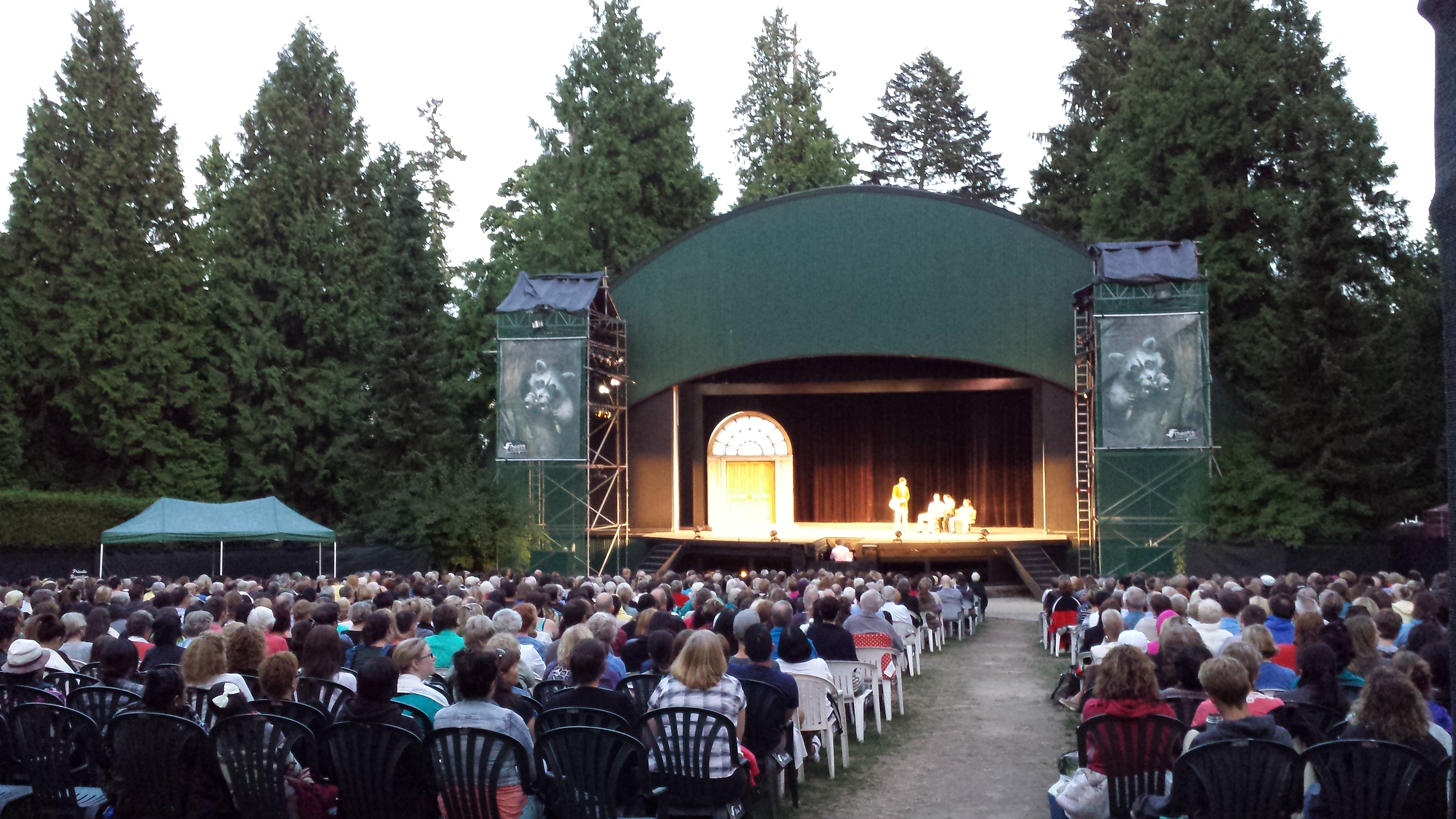
2013 TUTS production at Malkin Bowl in Stanley Park

In 1934 the Vancouver Park Board used funds from former Mayor W.H. Malkin to build an outdoor band shell for summer concerts and orchestra music in his wife's memory. This became known as the Malkin Bowl.

Vancouver Civic Theatre Society was founded in 1940 under the auspices of the Vancouver Park Board by the board superintendent A.S. Wootten, the conductor Basil Horsfall, and the actor E.V. Young, with advice from Gordon Hilker, to provide entertainment in Stanley Park. Theatre Under the Stars officially opened on 6 August 1940.

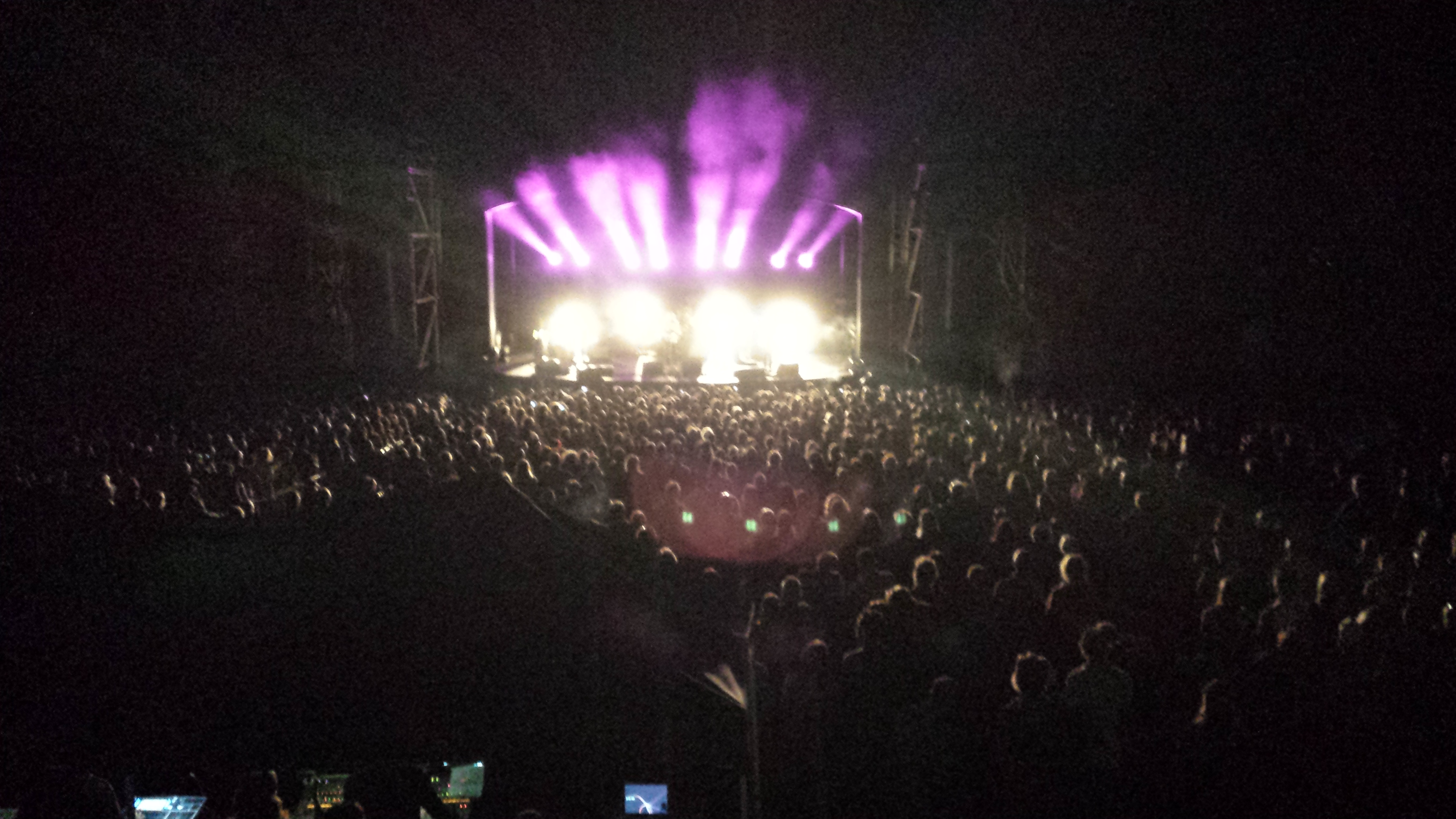
Concert at Malkin Bowl

Theatre Under The Stars Society had its last season in 1963. Then in 1969 a new theatre company, Theatre in the Park, began presenting two musicals a season. The company renamed itself to Theatre Under the Stars in 1980.

In 1982 a fire destroyed part of Malkin Bowl but the company was able to survive and rebuild the damaged outdoor theatre. The company has filed for bankruptcy twice, once in 1963 and again 2005. Ironically both times during its production of Can-Can. Each time the company took a season and reorganized.

TUTS has worked with independent and large scale promoters such as Live Nation Entertainment to use the Malkin Bowl site for events and music concerts.

== List of plays (alphabetical) ==
- 42nd Street - 2018
- A Funny Thing Happened on the Way to the Forum - 1981
- A Midsummer Night's Dream - 1940
- Anne of Green Gables – The Musical - 2003
- Annie - 2001, 2009
- Annie Get Your Gun - 1955, 1960, 1978, 1995, 2008
- Anything Goes - 1947, 1955, 1974, 1987, 2011
- As You Like It - 1940
- Beauty and the Beast - 2016
- The Belle of New York - 1941
- Bells Are Ringing - 1959
- The Best Little Whorehouse in Texas - 1989
- Big: the musical - 2005
- Bitter Sweet - 1944, 1948
- Bloomer Girl - 1949
- Blossom Time - 1942, 1950
- The Boy Friend - 1992
- Brigadoon - 1951, 1954, 1972, 1985
- Bye Bye Birdie - 1976, 1997, 2011
- Call Me Madam - 1961
- Camelot - 1976
- Can-Can - 1962, 1963, 2005
- Carousel - 1953, 1963, 1969, 1993
- Cats - 2024
- Charlie and the Chocolate Factory - 2025
- The Chocolate Soldier - 1942, 1945, 1951, 1959
- Chu Chin Chow - 1950
- Rodgers and Hammerstein's Cinderella - 2018
- Countess Maritza - 1949
- The Count of Luxembourg - 1946, 1951
- Crazy for You - 2004
- Damn Yankees - 1958, 1985
- The Desert Song - 1943, 1947, 1953
- The Drowsy Chaperone - 2017
- Eileen - 1950
- Fiddler on the Roof - 1975, 1997
- Finian's Rainbow - 1952, 1956
- The Firefly - 1949
- Florodora - 1948
- Footloose - 2004
- The Fortune Teller - 1945
- The Geisha - 1940
- Gentlemen Prefer Blondes - 1956
- Girl Crazy - 1948
- The Gondoliers - 1942
- Grand opera (selections) - 1944
- Grease - 1984, 2000, 2007
- The Great Waltz - 1948, 1955
- Guys and Dolls - 1961, 1972, 1991
- Gypsy - 1963
- H.M.S. Pinafore - 1978, 1984
- Hair - 1988, 1998
- Hairspray - 2015
- Hello, Dolly! - 1971, 1990
- Hit the Deck - 1944, 1951
- How to Succeed in Business Without Really Trying - 2013
- Jesus Christ Superstar - 1996, 2008
- Joseph and the Amazing Technicolor Dreamcoat - 2002, 2010
- The King and I - 1958, 1959, 1971, 1989, 2003
- Kismet - 1960
- Kiss Me, Kate - 1953, 1957, 1981, 2002
- La Cage aux Folle - 1992
- Legally Blonde - 2013, 2014, 2025
- Little Mary Sunshine - 1963
- The Little Mermaid - 2026
- Little Shop of Horrors - 1988, 1994, 2001
- The Maid of the Mountains - 1951
- Mamma Mia - 2019
- Mary Poppins - 2017
- Masquerade - 1947
- Matilda the Musical - 2023
- Maytime - 1945, 1951
- Mean Girls - 2027
- The Merry Widow - 1946, 1949, 1956, 1971
- Merrie England - 1941
- The Mikado - 1941, 1946, 1980
- Music in the Air - 1947, 1955
- The Music Man - 1991, 2012
- My Fair Lady - 1970, 1980
- Naughty Marietta - 1944, 1948
- The New Moon - 1944, 1954
- Newsies - 2019
- No, No, Nanette - 1950, 1979
- Oklahoma! - 1954, 1959, 1973, 1986, 1998, 2007
- Oliver! - 1970, 1987, 2015
- The Pajama Game - 1957, 1973, 1990
- The Pirates of Penzance - 1947, 1979
- The Prom - 2023
- The Red Mill - 1945, 1952
- Titanic - 2012
- Rio Rita - 1945
- Roberta - 1946, 1949
- Rose-Marie - 1943, 1953
- School of Rock - 2024
- Show Boat - 1958
- Shrek The Musical - 2014
- Singin' in the Rain - 2010
- Sister Act - 2026
- Something Rotten! - 2022
- Song of Norway - 1949, 1953
- The Sound of Music - 1974, 1996
- South Pacific - 1956, 1962, 1975, 1986, 2000
- The Spirit of Malkin Bowl (original) - 1982
- The Student Prince - 1943, 1948, 1957
- Sweet Charity - 1993
- Sweethearts - 1950
- Thoroughly Modern Millie - 2009
- Timber!! (original) - 1952
- Waltz in Old Vienna (original) - 1944, 1947, 1952, 1960
- West Side Story - 1977, 1988, 1994, 1999, 2016, 2027
- The Wizard Of Oz - 1952, 1960
- The Vagabond King - 1945
- We Will Rock You - 2022
- Where's Charley? - 1957
- Wonderful Town - 1962

== Notable alumni ==
- Ernest Adams
- Lucio Agostini
- Milla Andrew
- Graeme Andrews
- Donald Bell
- Michael Berry
- Stanley Bligh
- Drew Borland
- John Brockington
- Harold Brown
- Eleanor Collins
- Hernando Cortez
- Cliff Cox
- Bill Elliott
- Michael Foster
- Don Francks
- David Fryer
- Beverly Fyfe
- Don Garrard
- Audrey Glass
- Robert Goulet
- Edgar Hanson
- James Hibbard
- Earl Hobson
- Rosanne Hopkins
- Basil Horsfall
- Joanne Hounsell
- Juliette
- Tom Kerr
- Paul Kligman
- Ross Laidley
- Otto Lowy
- Grace Macdonald
- Jerry McDonald
- Alex McLeod
- Don McManus
- Ray Michael
- David Newman
- Karl Norman
- John Payne
- Betty Phillips
- Shel Piercy
- Barney Potts
- John Pozer
- Harry Pryce
- Reg Romero
- Bob Ross
- Lorne Scott
- Norman Slack
- David Smith
- Cecilia Smith
- Sophie Turko

== See also ==
- Malkin Bowl
