= Neil Chotem =

Canadian composer (1920–2008)

Neil Chotem (9 September 1920 – 21 February 2008) was a Canadian composer, arranger, conductor, pianist, and music educator.

== Works ==
Chotem's compositional style is tonal, and often incorporates elements of jazz and popular music. He composed a considerable body of works for television and radio and also wrote music for a number of leading Canadian performers like Maureen Forrester, Paul Piché, and Michel Rivard. In 1968 he, Paul de Margerie, and Marcel Lévêque were awarded a Montreal Festival du disque prize for 3-12, an LP for which the three men all worked together as conductors and arrangers. He received another prize from that same organization that same year for Renée Claude's recording of his arrangement of Jacques Brel's song Ne me quitte pas. For the progressive rock band Harmonium he wrote, arranged and conducted the orchestral score for their critically acclaimed double album L'Heptade (1976). In 1993, he received the Prix de la Guilde from the Guilde des musiciens du Québec.

== Biography ==
Chotem was born in Saskatoon, and began studying the piano at the age of 5 at the Palmer School of Music. He became a pupil of Lyell Gustin in 1930 with whom he studied for almost the next nine years. He also studied with Jeannette Durno in Chicago in 1934. He began his career as a concert pianist in the early 1930s, making his first appearance with an orchestra in 1933 playing Camille Saint-Saëns's Piano Concerto No. 2 with the Regina Symphony Orchestra. He was highly active as a concert pianist, recitalist, and radio performer in Winnipeg where he lived with his family between 1935 and 1939. The outbreak of World War II interfered with his early career, although he did perform a number of recitals in western Canadian cities and appeared in concerts as a duo-pianist with Gordon Kushner. From 1942 to 1945 he was a member of the Royal Canadian Air Force.

After leaving the RCAF, Chotem lived in Montreal where he worked actively as not only a concert pianist by also a composer and conductor. He also continued further studies in piano with Michel Hirvy from 1946 to 1950. As a pianist he made a number of recordings, gave concerts in many important Canadian concert halls, and worked as an arranger and performer for the program Music from Montreal from 1955 to 1960. In November 1946 he toured Canada as the accompanist for Austrian tenor Richard Tauber and in 1947 he appeared on screen in the film La Forteresse playing André Mathieu's Concerto de Québec. He made his first appearance with the Toronto Symphony Orchestra playing Sergei Rachmaninoff's Piano Concerto No. 2 and César Franck's Symphonic Variations on 4 April 1947. From 1946 to 1948 he played in a jazz trio with bassist Lucien Gravel and drummer Donat Gariépy, notably appearing in a series of broadcasts for CBC Radio. He continued to perform regularly with Canadian orchestras and on Canadian radio and television up through the 1960s.

As conductor, Chotem made several recordings with the CBC Montreal Orchestra and was a guest conductor with several prominent Canadian orchestras, including the Montreal Symphony Orchestra (the summers 1969–1972), the Quebec Symphony Orchestra (1970–1972), and the National Arts Centre Orchestra among others. He also taught on the music faculties of several Canadian universities and conservatories, including McGill University (1955–1956, 1970–1976), the University of Montreal (1970–1972), and the Conservatoire de musique du Québec à Montréal (1973–1976) among others. Some of his notable pupils include Hugh Davidson, Marcel Lévêque, Galt MacDermot, and Art Phillips. He was an associate of the Canadian Music Centre. He died in Greenfield Park, Quebec, aged 87.
