= Harmonium (Harmonium album) =

Studio album by Harmonium
- Released: February 20, 1974
- Recorded: 4–10 January 1974
- Studios: Studio Tempo, Montreal, Quebec, Canada
- Genre: Folk rock
- Length: 47:08
- Language: French
- Labels: Atlantic; Celebration; Gamma; Polydor; Quality; Universal
- Producer: Robert A. Morten

Harmonium chronology
Harmonium (1974)	Les cinq saisons (1975)

Singles from Harmonium
- 1. "Pour un instant / 100,000 raisons" Released: 1974; 2. "Harmonium" Released: 1975

Harmonium is the debut album by Québécois folk rock band Harmonium. It was originally released on February 20, 1974, by Celebration Records, a subsidiary of Quality Records in Québec. The release received numerous reissues over the years via such labels as Atlantic Records, Polydor Records, Gamma Records, and Quality Records proper, across the rest of Canada and in France.

In celebration of its 45th anniversary in 2019, the album was remastered and reissued as a deluxe edition under the title Harmonium XLV via Universal Music Canada. The reissue contains newly re-recorded material.

It remains the band's most folk-driven album, and features the song that made them famous, "Pour un instant". Its instrumentation is nowhere near as exotic as that of their later albums, mostly sticking to simple guitar and bass arrangements with occurrences of drums on a few songs.

Professional ratings
Review scores
Source	Rating
Allmusic	(link)

== Track listing ==
Side one
No.	Title	Lyrics	Music	Length
1.	"Harmonium" / "Harmonium (Suite)"	Fiori; Normandeau	Fiori; Normandeau	6:30
2.	"Si doucement"	Fiori	Fiori	4:20
3.	"Aujourd'hui, je dis bonjour à la vie"	Fiori	Fiori	5:45
4.	"Vieilles courroies"	Fiori; Normandeau	Fiori	5:40
Total length:				22:15

CD reissue bonus track
No.	Title	Lyrics	Music	Length
5.	"100,000 raisons" (taken from the B-side of "Pour un instant" single.)	Fiori; Normandeau	Fiori; Normandeau	3:42
Total length:				25:57

Side two
No.	Title	Lyrics	Music	Length
1.	"Attends-moi"	Normandeau	Fiori	4:29
2.	"Pour un instant"	Normandeau	Fiori; Normandeau	3:16
3.	"De la chambre au salon"	Fiori	Fiori	5:35
4.	"Un musicien parmi tant d'autres"	Fiori	Fiori	7:02
Total length:				20:22

== Personnel ==
Harmonium

- Serge Fiori – lead vocals, backing vocals, acoustic twelve-string guitar, acoustic six-string guitar, flute
- Michel Normandeau – backing vocals, acoustic twelve-string guitar, acoustic six-string guitar, harmonica
- Louis Valois – bass guitar, acoustic piano, electric piano

Studio musicians

- Réjean Émond – drums
- Alan Penfold – flugelhorn
- Robert A. Morten – congas

Production

- Robert A. Morten – producer
- Michel Lachance – engineer
- Fred Torak – musical direction and arrangements
- Robert Lussier – photography
- Yves Ladouceur – artistic direction

== Charts ==
Chart (1975)	Peak position
Canada Top Albums/CDs (RPM)	67

== Certifications ==
Region	Certification	Certified units/sales
Canada (Music Canada)	2× Platinum	200,000^{^}
^{^} Shipments figures based on certification alone.
