= Les cinq saisons =

1975 studio album by Harmonium

Si on avait besoin d'une cinquième saison

Studio album by Harmonium
- Released: April 15, 1975
- Recorded: March 1975
- Studios: Studio Six, Montreal, Quebec, Canada
- Genres: Progressive folk; progressive rock
- Length: 41:28
- Language: French
- Labels: Celebration; Gamma; Polydor; Universal
- Producers: Harmonium; Peter Burns

Harmonium chronology
Harmonium (1974)	Si on avait besoin d'une cinquième saison (1975)	L'heptade (1976)

Singles from Les cinq saisons
- 1. "Dixie / En pleine face" Released: 1975

Professional ratings
Review scores
Source	Rating
Allmusic	4.5/5 stars

Si on avait besoin d'une cinquième saison (french for If We Needed a Fifth Season), better known as Les cinq saisons (The Five Seasons), is the second studio album by Québécois progressive folk/rock band Harmonium. It was released on April 15, 1975, in Canada by Celebration Records, a subsidiary of Quality Records. It was the band's second and final release for the record company, as its contract expired in October 1975. Les cinq saisons was released in France via Gamma Records. PolyGram, which absorbed the interests of Quality Records, later reissued the album on various formats in several countries via its record company Polydor Records. PolyGram/Polydor was eventually bought out by Universal Music Group, which continues to reissue and distribute the album.

The album revolves around a seasonal concept; the first four songs each represent one of the traditional four seasons, respectively spring ("Vert"), summer ("Dixie (Une toune qui me revient)"), autumn ("Depuis l'automne..."), and winter ("En pleine face"). The final song, "Histoires sans paroles," a seventeen-minute instrumental piece, represents an imaginary fifth season. Some of the album's lyrics, notably the ones for "Depuis l'automne...", reflect the band members' separatist political leanings, popular at the time. Les cinq saisons' cover artwork was painted by Canadian artist Louis-Pierre Bougie.

The release marked a departure from the folk rock sound of the band's eponymous debut album, Harmonium, towards a unique progressive folk sound (later evolving into proper progressive rock for L'heptade). It also showcased the growth of the band, as members Serge Fiori, Michel Normandeau, and Louis Valois were joined by Pierre Daigneault and Serge Locat. The band self-produced the release, with the help of mixing engineer Peter Burns, who had worked on Harmonium. Invited in the recording sessions were Marie Bernard, who played the Ondes Martenot on "En pleine face," and vocalist Judi Richards, who sang a solo on "Histoires sans paroles."

Les cinq saisons is regarded as "one of the best transitional albums ever recorded and an essential item in Québec's music history." It spent sixteen weeks on RPM's Top Albums chart, peaking to number 46. Within a year of its release, it was certified Gold by the Canadian Recording Industry Association, for sales exceeding 50,000 copies within Canada alone. Its success led to a bidding war for the band, which eventually signed with Columbia Records' Quebec-based subsidiary CBS Disques on February 12, 1976. A few days after signing with CBS DIsques, the album was nominated for a Juno Award for Best-Selling Album of the Year and the band was nominated for Group of the Year. Peter Burns was also nominated for Recording Engineer of the Year for his work on the release, as was Robert A. Morten (who executive-produced the album) for Producer of the Year. In May 1979, Les cinq saisons was certified Platinum by the Canadian Recording Industry Association, for sales exceeding 100,000 copies within Canada alone. Music journalist Bob Mersereau later ranked the album number 56 in his 2007 book The Top 100 Canadian Albums, and in 2015, Rolling Stone magazine ranked it 36th in its list 50 Greatest Prog Rock Albums of All Time.

== Track listing ==
Side one
No.	Title	Lyrics	Music	Length
1.	"Vert" (Le printemps et l'arrivée des couleurs)	Normandeau; Fiori	Normandeau	5:34
2.	"Dixie (Une toune qui me revient)" (L'été et l'arrivée de la chaleur)	Fiori	Fiori	3:26
3.	"Depuis l'automne..." (L'automne et le départ de bien des choses)	Fiori; Normandeau	Fiori	10:25
Total length:				19:25

Side two
No.	Title	Lyrics	Music	Length
1.	"En pleine face" (L'hiver et le départ de bien des gens)	Fiori	Fiori	4:51
2.	"Histoires sans paroles" (La cinquième saison) I. "L'isolement" II. "L'appel" III. "La rencontre" IV. "L'union" V. "Le grand bal"		Fiori	17:12
Total length:				22:03

== Personnel ==
Credits are adapted from the album's liner notes.

Harmonium

- Serge Fiori – lead vocals, twelve-string acoustic guitar, six-string acoustic guitar, mandolin, harp zither, western concert flute, cymbals, bass drum, spoons
- Michel Normandeau – backing vocals, six-string acoustic guitar, accordion, dulcimer
- Louis Valois – backing vocals, bass guitar, electric piano
- Pierre Daigneault – western concert flute, piccolo, soprano saxophone, clarinet, bass clarinet, recorder
- Serge Locat – grand piano, electric piano, mellotron, synthesizer

Additional musicians

- Marie Bernard – ondes Martenot (on "En pleine face")
- Judi Richards – vocals (on "Histoires sans paroles")

Production

- Harmonium – producer, musical arrangements
- Peter Burns – producer, mixing engineer, recording engineer
- Robert A. Morten – executive producer
- Nelson Vipond – mixing engineer
- Fred Torak – musical arrangements
- Louis-Pierre Bougie – illustrations
- Yves Ladouceur – management and artistic direction

== Charts ==
Chart (1975)	Peak position
Canada Top Albums/CDs (RPM)	47

== Certifications ==
Region	Certification	Certified units/sales
Canada (Music Canada)	Platinum	100,000^{^}
^{^} Shipments figures based on certification alone.
