= Harmonium (band) =

Canadian progressive folk band

- Origin: Montreal, Quebec, Canada
- Genres: Folk rock; progressive folk; progressive rock; psychedelic rock; art rock
- Years active: 1972–1979
- Labels: Atlantic; CBS; Celebration; Epic; Gamma; Polydor; Quality; Sony; Spalax; Tacca; Universal; Zone 3
- Past members: Serge Fiori; Michel Normandeau; Louis Valois; Richard Beaudet; Pierre Daigneault; Serge Locat; Denis Farmer; Libert Subirana; Monique Fauteux; Robert Stanley; Yvan Ouellet; Jeff Fisher

Harmonium was a Canadian progressive rock band formed in 1972 in Montreal, Quebec. It became one of the best-known music bands in French Canada of the 1970s.

== History ==
=== Formation and Harmonium (1972–1974) ===
Lead vocalist and guitarist Serge Fiori met Michel Normandeau (vocals and guitar) in a theatre music meeting in November 1972. Later on, in 1973, they met bassist Louis Valois and formed Harmonium. In November 1973, the group performed their first air play on CHOM-FM. They played three songs: "Pour un instant," "Un musicien parmi tant d'autres," and "Un refrain parmi tant d'autres." The first two songs were later recorded professionally to be put on their eponymous debut album. The last song was a sequel to "Un musicien parmi tant d'autres", but never made the album cut, staying unreleased. A single was also released at the time with the hit "Pour un instant" on the A-side and "100,000 Raisons" on the B-side, the latter was eventually included on the CD-reissue version of the album nearly 20 years later. This album was a huge success and a sold out tour was staged all over Quebec and in French Canada.

Although a member since 1973, flute and saxophone player Richard Beaudet did not perform on Harmonium. He was replaced by Pierre Daigneault in April 1974. On April 27, 1974, Harmonium was interviewed and performed on the CBC Radio program The Entertainers. In August 1974, pianist, keyboardist, and synthesizer player Serge Locat joined the band.

=== Les cinq saisons (1974–1975) ===
Their second album, Si on avait besoin d'une cinquième saison, better known as Les cinq saisons, was an immediate success. This concept album includes five songs, each representing a season, with the last song being a long instrumental introducing a fifth imaginary season. For this album, the band invited two guests to play on the sessions: Judi Richards, who handles the vocalizations on the instrumental "Histoires sans paroles" and Marie Bernard performing the theremin-like sounds of the Martenot waves on "En pleine face".

At the Juno Awards of 1976, held on March 15, Harmonium was nominated for Group of the Year and Les cinq saisons was nominated for Best-Selling Album of the Year. In 2015, Rolling Stone magazine listed this album at number 36 of the best 50 progressive rock album and declared it the best progressive folk album.

=== L'heptade (1976–1977) ===
On February 12, 1976, Harmonium signed with Columbia Records' Quebec-based subsidiary, CBS Disques. Drummer Denis Farmer (formerly of Ville Émard Blues Band, Contraction, and Toubabou) joined in late February 1976, after meeting Fiori and Valois when they were all recruited to play in Bo Diddley's live backing band for his Montreal show on February 13, 1976. The double album L'Heptade, was released in November 1976, after months of recording in Fiori's house in Saint-Césaire, Québec. The songs describe seven stages of consciousness in a person's daily life. The first and the last songs are named "Comme un fou" and "Comme un sage", indicating a progression towards wisdom; from a fool to a sage. Normandeau, who helped write a majority of the material on the album, departed shortly into the recording of the release.

The band then embarked on a lengthy, 110-show tour which spanned from September 1976 to June 1977. The tour was divided into three legs, each offering a different set list and presentation. In January 1977, the band officially welcomed three session musicians from L'heptade for the second leg of the tour: flute and saxophone player Libert Subirana; pianist, keyboardist, and backing vocalist Monique Fauteux; and guitarist Robert Stanley (the latter of whom had played with Farmer in Ville Émard Blues Band, Contraction, and Toubabou, and was also part of Diddley's live Montreal band). In February 1977, Harmonium was booked for a 15-date Mexican tour, but pulled out at the last minute, leading Stringband to replaced them.

=== European tour and hiatus (1977–1978) ===
Locat, who later revealed in an interview that he had not been permitted by Fiori to contribute his compositions to the band, announced his departure in August 1977, wanting to record a solo album. However, he remained until November 1977, to fulfill a European tour opening for Supertramp.

With Locat's departure, the remaining members of Harmonium decided to take a break and focus on outside projects and commitments. Fiori teamed up with Richard Séguin to create the album Deux cents nuits à l'heure, which had been in development for four years and was finally released in May 1978, featuring several Harmonium members as session musicians. Valois produced and performed on an album by Marie-Claire Séguin, which also featured Farmer and Stanley.

=== American tour, planned fourth album, and dissolution (1978–1979) ===
After a full American tour failed to materialize in the spring of 1978, Harmonium was later invited to perform a handful of concerts in Berkeley and Los Angeles in September 1978, where the performance of material was filmed by a team from the National Film Board of Canada and released theatrically as Harmonium en Californie in October 1979. Locat's keyboardist position was filled by Yvan Ouellett and later Jeff Fisher.

Fiori departed in late 1978, following the shows in the United States, and in early 1979 performed a series of shows as Fiori-Séguin (promoting the album which had been released a year earlier). Prior to his leaving, the band had already composed the majority of its planned fourth album, scheduled for release in March 1979. Without Fiori, Harmonium then comprised Valois, Farmer, Stanley, Subirana, and Fauteux, which together continued planning the fourth album, scheduled for release during the first half of 1979, but which ultimately never materialized.

== Legacy ==
In August 1980, a live recording of L'heptade, recorded in June 1977 in Vancouver, was released as a double album, Harmonium en tournée.

In 2007, all three of Harmonium's studio albums were named among the 100 greatest Canadian albums of all time in Bob Mersereau's book The Top 100 Canadian Albums. They were the only francophone albums from Quebec named to the list besides Jean-Pierre Ferland's Jaune.

L'heptade XL, a remixed version of the album, with a few minutes of new recordings, was released on November 18, 2016, to celebrate its fortieth anniversary. The initial mix of L'heptade was made as the group was touring Quebec and New Brunswick. The remastering reflected more closely the vision of Fiori, into fully open music compared to the original studio mix. It was accompanied by the release of an extra song recorded live in 1977, called "C'est dans le noir", available on iTunes. This song was recorded at the National Arts Centre in Ottawa during the tour for the album. Viens voir le paysage, a film of one of these performances, was also released on DVD for the same occasion.

In 2018, the group were awarded honorary Prix Félix at the 40th annual Gala de l'ADISQ. Despite being one of the most influential bands in Quebec music history, the band never won a Félix as they had broken up by the time the awards were launched.

A remix from the original 16-track master tapes of the group's first album, titled Harmonium XLV was released in December 2019 which includes a different take of the hit "Pour un instant". A reissue of Les cinq saisons was also announced but, as of 2024, remains unreleased.

In 2020, Simon Leclerc scored a full orchestral version of the totality of Harmonium's music and recorded it with the Montreal Symphony Orchestra. The album came as a surprise for Serge Fiori, who called it a masterpiece and maybe the best versions of his music as he stated in an interview at Radio-Canada, that this represented the ultimate evolution of his music that from day one was most likely meant to be played with such orchestral arrangements. "Histoires sans paroles : Harmonium symphonique" is distributed by mail order or download only.

== Discography ==
=== Studio albums ===
- Harmonium (1974; reissued as Harmonium XLV in 2019)
- Les cinq saisons (1975)
- L'Heptade (1976; reissued as L'heptade XL in 2016)

=== Live albums ===
- Harmonium en tournée (1980)

=== Singles ===
- "Pour un instant" / "100,000 Raisons" (1974)
- "Dixie" / "En pleine face" (1975)
- "C'est dans le noir" (2016)

=== Videography ===
- Harmonium en Californie (1979) (NFB)
- Viens voir le paysage (2016)

== Members ==
- Serge Fiori – lead vocals, backing vocals, twelve-string acoustic guitar, twelve-string electric guitar, six-string acoustic guitar, six-string electric guitar, electric piano, mandolin, harp zither, flute, western concert flute, cymbals, bass drum, spoons (November 1972 – 1978)
- Michel Normandeau – backing vocals, twelve-string acoustic guitar, six-string acoustic guitar, harmonica, accordion, dulcimer (November 1972 – Summer 1976)
- Louis Valois – backing vocals, electric bass guitar, acoustic piano, electric piano, Yamaha organ, Fender Rhodes piano, Moog Taurus (1973–1979)
- Richard Beaudet – flute, saxophone, clarinet (1973–1974)
- Pierre Daigneault – western concert flute, piccolo, soprano saxophone, clarinet, bass clarinet, recorder (April 1974 – 1976)
- Serge Locat – piano, grand piano, electric piano, mellotron, synthesizer, Yamaha organ, pipe organ (August 1974 – November 1977)
- Denis Farmer – drums, percussion, congas (February 1976 – 1979)
- Libert Subirana – backing vocals, alto flute, electric alto flute, soprano flute, alto saxophone, clarinet, bass clarinet (January 1977 – 1979)
- Monique Fauteux – backing vocals, piano, Fender Rhodes piano (January 1977 – 1979)
- Robert Stanley – six-string electric guitar (January 1977 – 1979)
- Yvan Ouellet – piano, keyboards, synthesizers (August 1978 – September 1978)
- Jeff Fisher – piano, keyboards, synthesizers (September 1978 – 1979)
