= Richard Séguin =

Québécois singer-songwriter (born 1952)

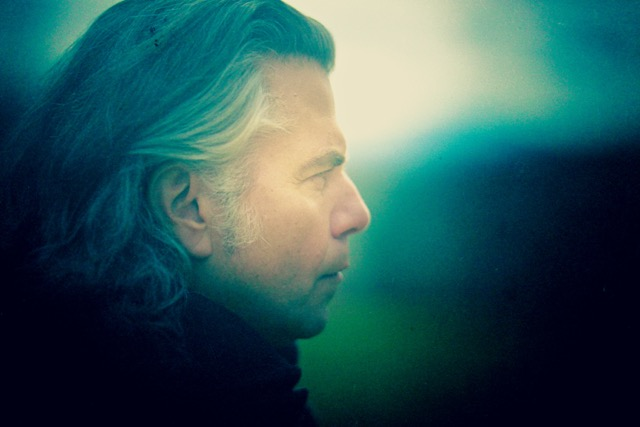

Background information
- Born: March 27, 1952 (age 74); Pointe-aux-Trembles, Québec, Canada
- Genres: Blues, folk, rock
- Occupations: Musician; songwriter; singer; producer; visual artist
- Instruments: Vocals, guitar
- Years active: 1970s – present

Richard Séguin (born March 27, 1952) is a Québécois songwriter, musician and singer.

His music career began in the 1970s with the duo Les Séguin, with his twin sister Marie-Claire. The duo achieved considerable popular success in Québec. Their folk reprise of Felix Leclerc's Le train du nord enjoyed huge radio play and record sales, along with other titles. Richard Séguin has led a solo career since 1979, frequently collaborating with his sister Marie Claire on many of her own solo albums.

Séguin has received several prizes, including Felix Awards from the Québec music industry association ADISQ. Some of his albums were certified platinum (sales of over 100 000 copies).

Séguin's songwriting features a delicately intertwined tapestry of blues, folk and rock music influences, feeding from the works of many musicians from Québec and abroad, a reflection of the artist's wide-open range of inspiration. Séguin's lyrics abound with powerful, striking metaphors, illustrating how power relationships not only modify social structures, but personal life as well. A few of his songs have been translated and recorded in English by Gary "U.S." Bonds.

In addition to his lifelong involvement in songwriting, Séguin has also developed considerable skills as a visual artist. His wood engravings borrow altogether from traditional Quebec folk art, Native American Art, German Expressionism and Arte Povera. Some of his work may be seen on his website. In his recent work, Seguin has been largely borrowing and incorporating fragments of poems by Gaston Miron. The mixture reveals to be intricate and complex, and strongly and coherently integrated to the visual patterns of Séguin's work, a brilliant remark of how Miron's poetry may not be dissociated from Québec's life environment.

At many occurrences in the course of his career, Séguin has expressed his complete support for Quebec independence, either within his song lyrics, or in public appearances.

On September 12, 2016, Séguin was the recipient of the prestigious Lifetime Achievement Award at the Francophone SOCAN Awards held in Montreal.

== Discography ==
- With Les Séguin
  - 1973: Séguin
  - 1974: En attendant
  - 1975: Récolte de rêves
  - 1976: Festin d'amour
- With Serge Fiori
  - 1978: Deux cents nuits à l'heure
- Solo
  - 1979: Richard Séguin
  - 1980: Trace et contraste
  - 1985: Double vie
  - 1988: Journée d'Amérique
  - 1991: Aux portes du matin
  - 1993: Vagabondage (live album)
  - 1995: D'instinct
  - 2000: Microclimat
  - 2003: Solo
  - 2006: Lettres ouvertes
  - 2010: Séguin et le grand choeur (live compilation with a choir of 600)
  - 2011: Appalaches
  - 2012: Ma demeure (three-CD compilation, live performance DVD and book set)
  - 2016: Les horizons nouveaux
  - 2018: Retour à Walden
- In collaboration
  - 2011: Douze hommes rapaillés (12-artist collective)
