= Hayley Kiyoko discography =

- Studio albums: 2
- EPs: 4
- Soundtrack albums: 1
- Singles: 34
- Music videos: 30
- Promotional singles: 8

American singer Hayley Kiyoko has released three studio albums, four extended plays, thirty-two singles (including eight as a featured artist) and eight promotional singles. Kiyoko's debut EP, A Belle to Remember, was released in March 2013. Her next EP, This Side of Paradise, was released in February 2015 and spawned three singles: "This Side of Paradise", "Girls Like Girls", and "Cliff's Edge". In 2016, she released the singles "Gravel to Tempo", and "One Bad Night", included on the EP Citrine which was released later that year. In 2017, two new singles, titled "Sleepover" and "Feelings", were released. These were included, along with the follow-up single "Curious" on Kiyoko's debut album Expectations, which was released on March 30, 2018. Her second album, PANORAMA, was released on July 29, 2022 In 2026, three singles including "collide (feat. gigi perez)," "red bikini (feat. snow wife)," and "girls like girls (from the motion picture) were released. Her third studio album, girls like girls the album, was released on June 12, 2026 as a companion to her feature film directorial debut, Girls Like Girls.

== Albums ==
=== Studio albums ===
List of studio albums, with selected details and chart positions
Title	Details	Peak chart positions					
Title	Details	US	AUS	CAN	IRE	NZ	UK
Expectations	Released: March 30, 2018; Format: CD, digital download, streaming, vinyl; Label: Empire, Atlantic	12	20	16	23	25	24
PANORAMA	Released: July 29, 2022; Format: CD, digital download, streaming, vinyl; Label: Empire, Atlantic	—	—	—	—	—	—
"—" denotes a recording that did not chart or was not released in that territory.

=== Soundtrack albums ===
List of soundtrack albums
Title	Details
girls like girls the album	Released: June 12, 2026; Label: KRO, One Riot Records, Rich Youth Records; Formats: CD, digital download, streaming, vinyl

== Extended plays ==
List of extended plays, with selected chart positions
Title	Details	Peak chart positions	
Title	Details	US Heat	NZ Heat.
A Belle to Remember	Released: March 12, 2013; Format: Digital download, streaming; Label: Self-released, Dollylama	—	—
This Side of Paradise	Released: February 3, 2015; Format: CD, digital download, streaming; Label: Self-released, Steel Wool	—	—
Citrine	Released: September 30, 2016; Format: CD, digital download, streaming; Label: Empire, Atlantic	4	6
I'm Too Sensitive for This Shit	Released: January 14, 2020; Format: Digital download, streaming, vinyl; Label: Empire, Atlantic	—	—

== Singles ==
=== As lead artist ===
List of singles as lead artist, with selected chart positions, showing year released and album name
Title	Year	Peak chart positions					Certifications	Album
Title	Year	US Pop	US Dance Airplay	AUS	NZ Heat.	NZ Hot	Certifications	Album
"A Belle to Remember"	2013	—	—	—	—	—		A Belle to Remember
"Rich Youth"	2014	—	—	—	—	—		A Belle to Remember
"This Side of Paradise"	2014	—	—	—	—	—		This Side of Paradise
"Girls Like Girls"	2015	—	—	—	—	—	RIAA: Gold	This Side of Paradise
"Cliff's Edge"	2015	—	—	—	—	—		This Side of Paradise
"Gravel to Tempo"	2016	—	—	—	—	—		Citrine
"One Bad Night"	2016	—	—	—	—	—		Citrine
"Sleepover"	2017	—	—	—	—	—		Expectations
"Feelings"	2017	—	—	—	—	—		Expectations
"Curious"	2018	40	37	—	—	—		Expectations
"What I Need" (featuring Kehlani)	2018	—	—	— (Note: "What I Need" did not enter the Top 100 Singles Chart, but peaked at number 11 on the Hitseekers Singles chart.)	8	—		Expectations
"I Wish"	2019	—	—	—	—	20		I'm Too Sensitive for This Shit
"Demons"	2019	—	—	—	—	38		I'm Too Sensitive for This Shit
"L.O.V.E. Me"	2019	—	—	—	—	—		I'm Too Sensitive for This Shit
"Runaway"	2019	—	—	—	—	—		I'm Too Sensitive for This Shit
"She"	2020	—	—	—	—	—		I'm Too Sensitive for This Shit
"Found My Friends"	2021	—	—	—	—	—		Panorama
"Chance"	2021	—	—	—	—	—		Panorama
"Cherry" (with Fletcher)	2021	—	—	—	—	—		Non-album single
"For the Girls"	2022	—	—	—	—	—		Panorama
"Deep in the Woods"	2022	—	—	—	—	—		Panorama
"Panorama"	2022	—	—	—	—	—		Panorama
"Hungry Heart" (with Steve Aoki and Galantis)	2023	—	4	—	—	—		Hiroquest 2: Double Helix
"Greenlight"	2023	—	—	—	—	—		Non-album singles
"Somewhere Between the Sand and the Stardust"	2023	—	—	—	—	—		Non-album singles
"Sadness" (with Cash Cash)	2025	—	—	—	—	—		Non-album singles
"collide" (featuring Gigi Perez)	2026	—	—	—	—	—		Girls Like Girls
"red bikini" (featuring Snow Wife)	2026	—	—	—	—	—		Girls Like Girls
"girls like girls (from the motion picture)"	2026	—	—	—	—	—		Girls Like Girls
"—" denotes releases that did not chart or were not released in that territory.

=== As featured artist ===
List of singles as a featured artist, with selected chart positions, showing year released and album name
Title	Year	Peak chart positions		Album
Title	Year	US	US Heat.	Album
"Breakthrough" (as part of Lemonade Mouth cast)	2011	88	11	Lemonade Mouth
"Baby Fox" (Saturday, Monday featuring Hayley Kiyoko)	2016	—	—	Superset
"Need You Closer" (Phantoms featuring Hayley Kiyoko)	2017	—	—	Phantoms
"Glory Days" (Sweater Beats featuring Hayley Kiyoko)	2017	—	—	For the Cold
"Headcase" (Kailee Morgue featuring Hayley Kiyoko)	2019	—	—	Non-album single
"Missed Calls" (MAX featuring Hayley Kiyoko)	2020	—	—	Colour Vision
"Bang!" (AhhHaa Remix) (AJR featuring Hayley Kiyoko)	2020	—	—	Non-album singles
"Taste So Good (The Cann Song)" (Vincint featuring Hayley Kiyoko, Kesha and MNEK)	2022	—	—	Non-album singles
"—" denotes releases that did not chart or were not released in that territory.				Non-album singles

=== Promotional singles ===
List of promotional singles, showing year released and album name
Title	Year	Album
"Don't Stop the Revolution" (as part of Lemonade Mouth cast)	2012	Non-album promotional single
"Given It All"	2015	This Side of Paradise
"Pretty Girl"	2016	Citrine
"Palace"	2017	Citrine
"Let It Be"	2018	Expectations
"Mr. Brightside"	2020	Non-album promotional single
"Forever" (featuring Johnny Rain)	2022	Panorama
"Underground"	2022	Panorama

== Guest appearances ==
List of other appearances, showing year released, other artist(s) credited and album name
Title	Year	Other artist(s)	Album
"Scarlett Fever"	2007	Myles Morgan, Darren Dahl, Daniel Gootnick, Matt Clark	Hede
"Sinister Plan"	2007	Myles Morgan, Darren Dahl, Daniel Gootnick, Matt Clark	Hede
"Warehouse"	2007	Myles Morgan, Darren Dahl, Daniel Gootnick, Matt Clark	Hede
"To Whom It May Concern"	2007	Myles Morgan, Darren Dahl, Daniel Gootnick, Matt Clark	Hede
"Albatross"	2007	Myles Morgan, Darren Dahl, Daniel Gootnick, Matt Clark	Hede
"Here We Go"	2011	Lemonade Mouth cast	Lemonade Mouth
"More Than a Band"	2011	Lemonade Mouth cast	Lemonade Mouth
"Jolly Old Saint Nick"	2013	—N/a	A Very Maker Music Christmas
"Movie Star"	2015	—N/a	Jem and the Holograms
"Hungry Heart (Steve Aoki Bedroom Mix)"	2023	Steve Aoki, Galantis	Hiroquest 2: Double Helix Remixed
"Hungry Heart (Bassjackers Remix)"	2024	Steve Aoki, Galantis	Hiroquest 2: Double Helix Remixed

== Music videos ==
List of music videos, showing year released, other artist(s) credited and director(s)
Title	Year	Other artist(s)	Director(s)	Ref.
As lead artist
"A Belle to Remember"	2013	None	Colton Dearing	
"Somewhere Only We Know" (Keane Cover)	2013	None	Hayley Kiyoko	
"Jolly Old Saint Nick"	2013	None	Nina McNeely	
"Rich Youth"	2014	None	RJ Sanchez	
"This Side of Paradise"	2014	None	RJ Sanchez	
"Lips Are Movin" (Meghan Trainor Cover)	2014	None	Hayley Kiyoko	
"Girls Like Girls"	2015	None	Austin S. Winchell and Hayley Kiyoko	
"Cliff's Edge"	2015	None	Hayley Kiyoko	
"Gravel to Tempo"	2016	None	Hayley Kiyoko	
"One Bad Night"	2016	None	Hayley Kiyoko	
"Sleepover"	2017	None	Hayley Kiyoko	
"Feelings"	2017	None	Hayley Kiyoko	
"Curious"	2018	None	Hayley Kiyoko and James Larese	
"What I Need"	2018	Kehlani	Hayley Kiyoko	
"I Wish"	2019	None	Hayley Kiyoko	
"She"	2020	None	Hayley Kiyoko	
"Found My Friends"	2021	None	Hayley Kiyoko	
"Chance"	2021	None	Hayley Kiyoko	
"Cherry"	2021	Fletcher	Kristen Wong	
"For the Girls"	2022	None	Hayley Kiyoko	
"Deep in the Woods" (Visualizer)	2022	None	Hayley Kiyoko	
"Panorama"	2022	None	Hayley Kiyoko	
"Forever" (Visualizer)	2022	Johnny Rain	Hayley Kiyoko	
"Underground" (Visualizer)	2022	None	Hayley Kiyoko	
"Hungry Heart"	2023	Steve Aoki and Galantis	Hayley Kiyoko	
"Girls Like Girls (2026 Version)"	2026	None	Hayley Kiyoko	
As featured artist
"Breakthrough"	2011	As part of Lemonade Mouth cast	Patricia Riggen	
"Don't Stop the Revolution"	2012	As part of Lemonade Mouth cast	Unknown	
"Glory Days"	2017	Sweater Beats	Brad Wong	
"Missed Calls"	2020	MAX	Raul Gonzo	
"Taste So Good (The Cann Song)"	2022	Vincint featuring Kesha and MNEK	Jake Wilson	
Guest appearances
"You Need to Calm Down"	2019	Taylor Swift	Drew Kirsch and Taylor Swift	
