= Expectations Tour =

2018–19 concert tour by Hayley Kiyoko

Expectations
- Tour by Hayley Kiyoko
- Associated album: Expectations
- Start date: April 11, 2018
- End date: March 3, 2019
- Legs: 3
- No. of shows: 65

Hayley Kiyoko concert chronology
- One Bad Night Tour (2016–17); Expectations Tour (2018–19); Panorama Tour (2023)

The Expectations Tour was American singer Hayley Kiyoko's fourth headlining tour in support of her debut studio album, Expectations (2018). The tour began in San Diego on April 11, 2018, and concluded in Madrid on March 3, 2019. Jess Kent and Naaz performed as opening acts.

== Critical reception ==
Billboard praised Kiyoko for her "strong vocals and beast dance moves." In addition, she was praised for her stage presence and candor about sexuality and identity.

== Setlist ==
This set list is from the concert on June 5, 2018, in Cleveland, Ohio. It is not intended to represent all shows from the tour.

1. "Under the Blue/Take Me In"
2. "What I Need"
3. "Girls Like Girls"
4. "He'll Never Love You (HNLY)"
5. "Molecules"
6. "Mercy"
7. "Ease My Mind"
8. "This Side of Paradise"
9. "Palm Dreams"
10. "Wanna Be Missed"
11. "Pretty Girl"
12. "Sleepover"
13. "Curious"
14. "Feelings"
15. "Let It Be"
16. "Gatekeeper"
17. "Gravel to Tempo"

== Tour dates ==
List of 2018 concerts, showing date, city, country and venue
Date	City	Country	Venue
April 11, 2018	San Diego	United States	Observatory North Park
April 12, 2018	San Luis Obispo	United States	Fremont Theater
April 13, 2018	Santa Cruz	United States	Rio Theatre
April 15, 2018	Indio	United States	Coachella
April 17, 2018	Portland	United States	Wonder Ballroom
April 18, 2018	Vancouver	Canada	Vogue Theatre
April 19, 2018	Seattle	United States	The Showbox
April 22, 2018	Indio	United States	Coachella
April 24, 2018	San Francisco	United States	The Fillmore
April 27, 2018	Salt Lake City	United States	The Depot
April 28, 2018	Denver	United States	Summit Music Hall
April 30, 2018	Omaha	United States	The Waiting Room
May 1, 2018	Minneapolis	United States	Varsity Theater
May 3, 2018	Chicago	United States	House of Blues
May 4, 2018	St. Louis	United States	Delmar Hall
May 5, 2018	Lawrence	United States	Granada Theater
May 7, 2018	Austin	United States	Emo's
May 8, 2018	Houston	United States	House of Blues
May 9, 2018	Dallas	United States	Granada Theater
May 11, 2018	Atlanta	United States	Buckhead Theatre
May 12, 2018	Orlando	United States	Beacham Theatre
May 13, 2018	St. Petersburg	United States	State Theatre
June 1, 2018	Silver Spring	United States	Fillmore Silver Spring
June 2, 2018	Pittsburgh	United States	Mr. Smalls Theatre
June 3, 2018	Toronto	Canada	Danforth Music Hall
June 5, 2018	Cleveland	United States	House of Blues
June 6, 2018	Detroit	United States	Saint Andrew's Hall
June 8, 2018	Indianapolis	United States	Deluxe
June 9, 2018	Columbus	United States	Newport Music Hall
June 11, 2018	Charlotte	United States	The Underground
June 12, 2018	Norfolk	United States	The NorVa
June 14, 2018	Philadelphia	United States	Theatre of Living Arts
June 15, 2018	Boston	United States	Paradise Rock Club
June 16, 2018	New York City	United States	Irving Plaza
October 23, 2018	London	England	O2 Academy Islington
October 24, 2018	Manchester	England	Manchester Academy 2
October 26, 2018	London	England	O2 Academy Islington
October 28, 2018	Paris	France	Elysee Montmartre
October 30, 2018	Amsterdam	Netherlands	Melkweg Oude Zaal
November 1, 2018	Antwerp	Belgium	Zappa
November 2, 2018	Copenhagen	Denmark	Noisey Festival
November 4, 2018	Hamburg	Germany	Docks
November 5, 2018	Berlin	Germany	Huxleys Neue Welt
November 7, 2018	Reykjavík	Iceland	Iceland Airwaves

List of 2019 concerts, showing date, city, country and venue
Date	City	Country	Venue
January 29, 2019	Dublin	Ireland	Olympia Theatre
January 30, 2019	Dublin	Ireland	Olympia Theatre
February 1, 2019	Glasgow	Scotland	SWG3
February 3, 2019	Birmingham	England	O2 Academy Birmingham
February 4, 2019	Manchester	England	Manchester Academy
February 6, 2019	London	England	O2 Forum Kentish Town
February 7, 2019	London	England	O2 Forum Kentish Town
February 10, 2019	Brussels	Belgium	Ancienne Belgique
February 11, 2019	Copenhagen	Denmark	Vega Musikkens Hus
February 13, 2019	Oslo	Norway	Sentrum Scene
February 14, 2019	Stockholm	Sweden	Fryshuset
February 15, 2019	Hamburg	Germany	Groβe Freheit
February 17, 2019	Munich	Germany	Tonhalle
February 18, 2019	Paris	France	L'Olympia
February 19, 2019	Amsterdam	Netherlands	Paradiso Grote Zaal
February 21, 2019	Utrecht	Netherlands	Tivoli Vredenburg
February 22, 2019	Cologne	Germany	Carlswerk Victoria
February 25, 2019	Zürich	Switzerland	Kaufleuten
February 26, 2019	Vienna	Austria	Ottakringer Braurei
February 27, 2019	Milan	Italy	Fabrique
March 2, 2019	Barcelona	Spain	Razzmatazz
March 3, 2019	Madrid	Spain	Sala Black Box - Pal. Vistalegre
