= Kirsten Banks =

Australian astrophysicist and science communicator

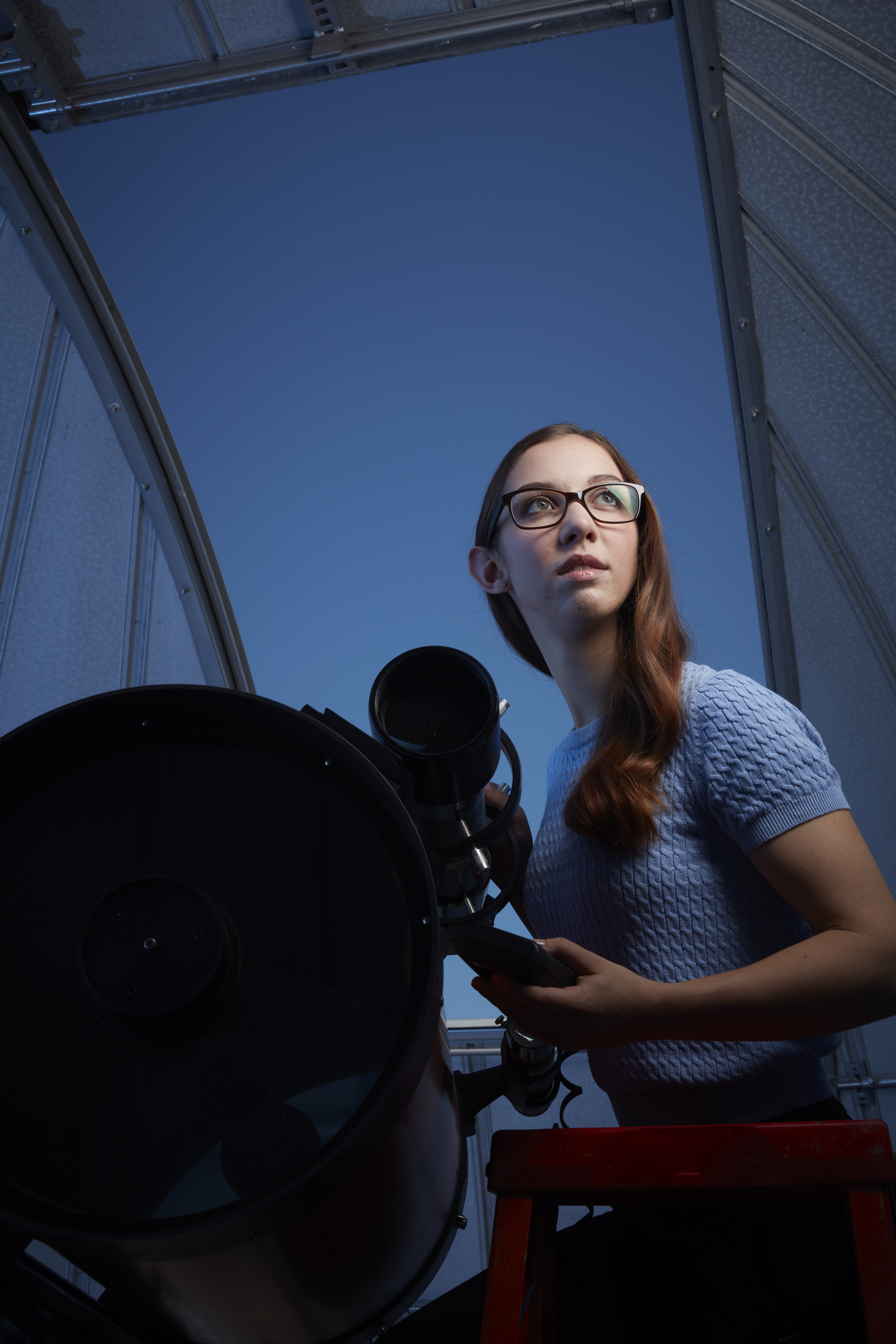
- Banks at UNSW Sydney
- Born: Kirsten Alexandra Banks; Sydney, New South Wales, Australia
- Education: Davidson High School
- Alma mater: University of New South Wales (BSc)
- Awards: CSIRO Indigenous STEM Award (2018)
- Scientific career
- Fields: Astrophysics; Aboriginal Astronomy
- Institutions: Sydney Observatory; University of New South Wales; Matrix Education

Kirsten Alexandra Banks is an Aboriginal Australian astrophysicist and science communicator of the Wiradjuri people, known for her work in promoting mainstream and Aboriginal astronomy. She earned a Bachelor of Science in physics from the University of New South Wales in 2018, and a Ph.D in June 2024, and worked at the Sydney Observatory.

== Career ==
Banks is a Wiradjuri woman who grew up in Sydney's Northern Beaches and graduated from Davidson High School in 2014. During primary school, Banks was interested in meteorology but always had a fascination with the stars and planets. She received a Bachelor of Science degree in physics from University of New South Wales (UNSW) in 2018 and started working as an astronomy guide at the Sydney Observatory.

While training at Sydney Observatory, Banks started to hear about Kamilaroi and Boorong astronomy, prompting her to learn more about her Indigenous Australian heritage. Through this she discovered her ancestry, the Wiradjuri people. Banks then began researching more about Indigenous astronomy, learning about "celestial emus that indicate when emu eggs are available". Learning about the Emu in the Sky constellation inspired Banks to share Aboriginal astronomy with others. While exploring bushland, Banks came across rock carvings that she says "appeared to show seven planets, plus the moon, all in a line". Banks wrote that as there would have been no light pollution at the time of the carvings' creation, there would have been the ability to see six planets in the night sky with the naked eye – Mercury, Venus, Mars, Jupiter, Saturn, and Uranus. Banks wrote, "I kept looking and thinking, and I realised that there was one planet missing". As Neptune is not physically visible to the human eye, Banks realised that the eighth circle may be the Earth.

I was flabbergasted – this could be evidence of our people knowing that Earth is a planet along with the others in our night skies ... a millennia before the likes of Galileo, who discovered this a mere 400 years ago!

— Kirsten Banks, 2018

For Banks's Honours project at UNSW, she is studying the evolution of galaxies and plans to continue on to do a PhD.

In 2021 her name was chosen for one of the two tunnelling machines to be used by Snowy Hydro, along with electrical engineer, Florence Violet McKenzie. She had been nominated by Brungle Public School student, Kobe Burnes.

Banks was shortlisted for the Celestino Eureka Prize for Promoting Understanding of Science at the 2026 Eureka Prizes.

== Science communication ==
Banks has worked as a science communicator and is also astronomer in residence on 2SER's weekend breakfast shows and Triple M's Night Shift. On 17 June 2019, Banks appeared as a panellist on a "Science Special" of the ABC Australia television programme Q&A.

Banks has promoted astrophysics and Indigenous science in the media. In 2019 she appeared on The Drum, in an episode which discussed Indigenous history. She also discussed astronomy and the role of planetary movement on ABC News, in July 2019. In Student Edge she described how her Aboriginal identity (as well as Leonardo DiCaprio) has influenced her passion for astronomy. Banks is also passionate about increasing the representation and prominence of women and girls in science.
