= Jess Kent =

Australian pop musician

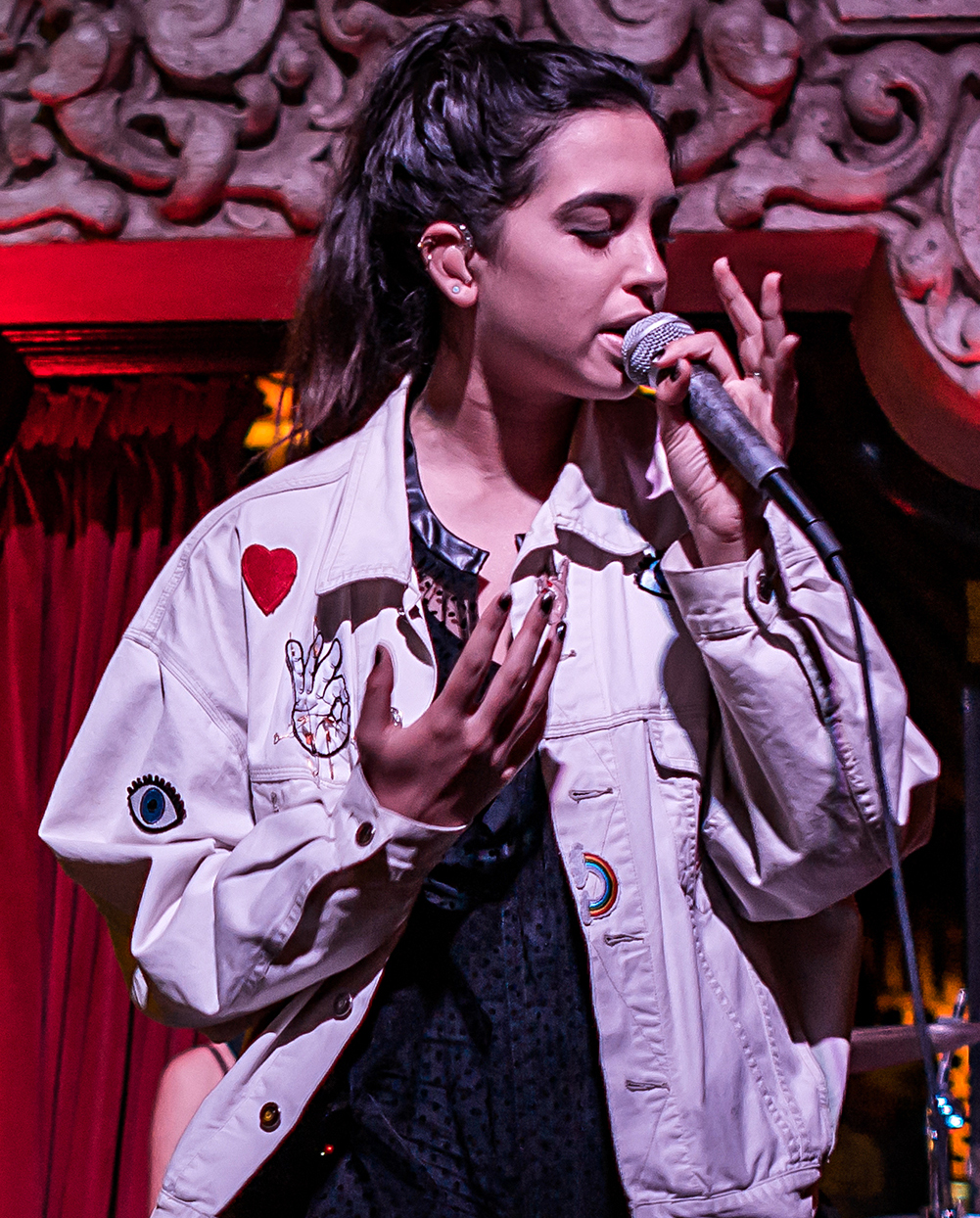
- Jess Kent in 2016

Background information
- Born: Derby, England
- Origin: Adelaide, Australia
- Genres: Pop; electropop; electronic; hip hop; indie
- Occupations: Singer; songwriter
- Instruments: Vocals; guitar
- Years active: 2015–present
- Labels: Ourness; Capitol
- Website: www.jesskent.com

Jess Kent is an Australian pop and electropop musician. Kent was born in Derby, England.

Kent is best known for her debut single, "Get Down", which was uploaded to Triple J Unearthed" in 2015 and became the most-played song on Triple J in November of the same year. "Get Down" ranked at number 185 on Triple J's Hottest 200 of 2015 and has accumulated more than 1.5 million streams on Spotify.

== Early life ==
Jess Kent was born in Derby, England. Her father was a blues rock guitarist, while her mother was of Indian-African descent.

From age seven, her father taught her how to play the guitar, and from age ten, she began songwriting. As a child, she busked with her older brother at pubs and parties. Kent lived in England until the age of eleven, when her family relocated to Adelaide, Australia. When she was eighteen, she moved to Sydney to pursue a music career.

== Personal life ==
Kent enjoys watching films, playing video games, visiting art museums, shows, and travelling. Her favourite film is Ferris Bueller's Day Off.

Kent currently resides in Sydney, Australia.

== Musical style and influences ==
Kent has been described as a pop, electropop, electronic, hip hop, and indie artist. Her debut single, "Get Down", was described as having "strong hip-hop/pop influences" and "strong reggae vibes".

In her early childhood years, Kent listened to bands such as The Clash, The Who, Oasis, Blondie, Bob Marley, The Beautiful Girls, and Beastie Boys. She later listened to bands such as Atomic Kitten and S Club 7 in her adolescent years. Her music has been compared to that of M.I.A, Santigold, Lily Allen, Tkay Maidza and Asta.

She considers The Police, The Clash, The Who, Blondie, Peter Gabriel, Phil Collins, Bob Marley and the Wailers, Dizzee Rascal, The Beautiful Girls, The Kooks, The Supremes and Marvin Gaye, and Red Hot Chili Peppers to be musical influences. Kent has stated that she would like to collaborate with Pharrell Williams or Mark Ronson.

== Career ==
=== 2015–2016: "Get Down" and My Name is Jess Kent ===
Kent uploaded her debut single "Get Down" to Triple J Unearthed on 22 September 2015. The song ranked at #185 on Triple J's Hottest 200 of 2015.

Kent released her follow-up single "The Sweet Spot" on 14 November 2016. She released her debut EP My Name is Jess Kent on 18 November 2016 through Capitol Records, which included both "Get Down" and "The Sweet Spot". "Trolls" was released as the third single from the EP on 10 May 2017.

On 13 January 2016, Kent collaborated with Australian producer Paces on the song "1993 (No Chill)" which featured on his debut album Vacation.

=== 2016–2019: Touring with Coldplay, Hayley Kiyoko, and Troye Sivan ===
In December 2016, Kent opened the Oceanian leg of British rock band Coldplay's A Head Full of Dreams Tour. She also opened the Asian leg of the tour in March and April 2017.

In April 2018, Kent performed as an opening act on Hayley Kiyoko's Expectations Tour.

=== 2020: Parking Karma ===
On 5 June 2020, Kent released "No One Else", her first single in two years, and announced that she would release a second EP later that year. On 21 August 2020, she released "Life Happens", the second single from the EP, and announced it would be titled Parking Karma. Parking Karma was released on 18 September 2020. She will be performing for triple j Like A Version on Friday 9 October 2020.

== Discography ==
=== Extended plays ===
List of extended plays, with release date and label shown
Title	Details
My Name is Jess Kent	Released: 18 November 2016; Label: Capitol; Formats: Digital download, streaming
Parking Karma	Released: 18 September 2020; Label: Ourness; Formats: Digital download, streaming

=== Singles ===
==== As lead artist ====
List of singles as lead artist, with year released and album shown
Title	Year	Album
"Get Down"	2015	My Name is Jess Kent
"The Sweet Spot"	2016	My Name is Jess Kent
"Trolls"	2017	My Name is Jess Kent
"Bass Bumps"	2018	Non-album singles
"No Love Songs" (featuring Wes Period)	2018	Non-album singles
"Girl"	2018	Non-album singles
"Slushie"	2019	Non-album singles
"No One Else"	2020	Parking Karma
"Life Happens"	2020	Parking Karma

==== As featured artist ====
List of singles as featured artist, with year released and album shown
Title	Year	Album
"1993 (No Chill)" (Paces featuring Jess Kent)	2016	Vacation
"Out My Mind" (Set Mo featuring Jess Kent)	2022	

=== Music videos ===
List of music videos, with year released and director shown
Title	Year	Director
"Get Down" (Lyric Video)	2015	None
"The Sweet Spot"	2016	None
"Trolls"	2017	Jamie Martinez
"Bass Bumps" (Visualizer)	2018	None
"No Love Songs" (Audio) (featuring Wes Period)	2018	None
"Girl" (Lyric Video)	2018	None
"Slushie" (Lyric Video)	2019	Beck Quade
"No One Else"	2020	Bart Celestino
