= Panorama (Hayley Kiyoko album) =

Studio album by Hayley Kiyoko
- Released: July 29, 2022
- Recorded: 2020–2022
- Length: 41:06
- Labels: Empire; Atlantic
- Producers: Danja; Jono Dorr; Kill Dave; Pat Morrissey

Hayley Kiyoko chronology
I'm Too Sensitive for This Shit (2020)	Panorama (2022)	girls like girls the album (2026)

Singles from Panorama
- 1. "Found My Friends" Released: April 30, 2021; 2. "Chance" Released: June 1, 2021; 3. "For the Girls" Released: May 20, 2022; 4. "Deep in the Woods" Released: June 24, 2022; 5. "Panorama" Released: July 29, 2022

Panorama (stylised in all caps) is the second studio album by American singer and actress Hayley Kiyoko, released on July 29, 2022, through Empire and Atlantic.

== Background ==
Before the release of the extended play I'm Too Sensitive for This Shit, Kiyoko had already announced that she had plans to work on her sophomore studio album on December 6, 2018, at the 2018 Billboard Women in Music Awards in an interview with Billboard.

At the 30th Annual GLAAD Media Awards on March 28, 2019, Kiyoko confirmed that after touring Europe for both her Expectations Tour and European Encore Tour for the last couple of months, she has started working on new music for her second album. She also stated that the "color palette" of this project is "darker" than her debut album, Expectations (2018).

On February 6, 2021, during a livestream on Instagram about her Hue fragrance Kiyoko talked about the album. She revealed that the album has a similar sound to "What I Need":

I've been working on my new album and this Hue perfume definitely reminds me of my new music. […] I've been working on my album for a very long time and I've just wanted it to be perfect, and elevated and epic. I don't have anything mixed [...] but I'm about to get the music mixed and hopefully have some new music for you soon.

— Kiyoko on Instagram

== Critical reception ==
Professional ratings
Aggregate scores
Source	Rating
Metacritic	57/100
Review scores
Source	Rating
Clash	6/10
Gigwise	7/10 stars
The Line of Best Fit	7/10
Pitchfork	5.6/10
The Guardian	2/5 stars

Panorama received mixed reviews from critics upon release. Writing for Pitchfork, Emma Madden said that the album's theme of "embracing the journey and the struggle, rather than the destination, feels as bromidic and remote as a commercial for therapy" and that Kiyoko "hides behind well-trodden pop star guises" on the album, meaning it ultimately "carries the unmistakable metallic tang of reverse engineering". The Guardian's Ammar Kalia called Kiyoko's return four years after Expectations "altogether flatter", opining that "where Expectations saw Kiyoko taking space to explore her own voice, Panorama feels like a leap backwards, trading personality for affectless tracks that fade into the background".

== Track listing ==
Panorama track listing
No.	Title	Writer(s)	Producer(s)	Length
1.	"Sugar at the Bottom"	Hayley Kiyoko; Brandon Colbein; Chloe George; David Dahlquist; Patrick Morrissey	Kill Dave; Morrissey; Danja; Nikki Flores^{[v]}	3:06
2.	"Luna"	Kiyoko; Colbein; E. Kidd Bogart; Dahlquist; Morrissey	Kill Dave; Morrissey; Danja; Kiyoko; Flores^{[v]}	2:47
3.	"For the Girls"	Kiyoko; Michelle Buzz; Marcus Lomax; Oliver Peterhof	German; Danja^{[a]}	2:38
4.	"Flicker Start"	Kiyoko; Trey Campbell; Bogart; Dahlquist; Morrissey; Paul Phamous	Danja; Flores^{[v]}	2:41
5.	"Underground"	Kiyoko; George; Dahlquist; Morrissey; Phamous	Kill Dave; Morrissey; Danja; Kiyoko; Flores^{[v]}	3:56
6.	"Forever" (featuring Johnny Rain)	Kiyoko; Johnny Rain; Colbein	Danja; Rain; Flores^{[v]}	3:43
7.	"Deep in the Woods"	Kiyoko; Brandi Flores; George; Dahlquist; Morrissey; Floyd Hills	Kill Dave; Morrissey; Danja; Kiyoko; Flores^{[v]}	3:09
8.	"Supposed to Be"	Kiyoko; Colbein; Chloe Angelides; Bogart; Jono Dorr	Danja; Flores^{[v]}	3:11
9.	"Chance"	Kiyoko; Nate Cyphert; Dahlquist; Morrissey; Hills	Danja; Flores^{[v]}	3:21
10.	"Well..."	Kiyoko; Colbein; Asia Whiteacre	Kill Dave; Morrissey; Flores^{[v]}	3:24
11.	"S.O.S."	Kiyoko; Dorr; Phamous	Dorr; Flores^{[v]}	2:41
12.	"Found My Friends"	Kiyoko; Bogart; Dahlquist; Morrissey	Kill Dave; Morrissey; Kiyoko; Danja^{[a]}; Flores^{[v]}	3:34
13.	"Panorama"	Kiyoko; Flores	Kill Dave; Morrissey; Kiyoko; Flores^{[v]}	2:55
Total length:				41:06

Notes

- all tracks stylised in lowercase
- ^{^[a]} indicates an additional producer
- ^{^[v]} indicates a vocal producer

== Personnel ==
Musicians

- Hayley Kiyoko – vocals (all tracks), programming (track 12)
- Danja – instrumentation, programming (1, 2, 4–10)
- Nikki Flores – vocal arrangement (1, 2, 4–11, 13)
- Peter Johnson – strings (5, 9)
- Johnny Rain – vocals (6)
- Kill Dave – programming (12)
- Pat Morrissey – programming (12)

Technical

- Tatsuya Sato – mastering (1–11)
- Emerson Mancini – mastering (12)
- Rob Kinelski – mixing
- Damien Lewis – engineering
- Chad Jolley – engineering (1–11)
- Jono Dorr – engineering (11)
- Dave Dahlquist – engineering (13)
- Casey Cuayo – mixing assistance
- Eli Heisler – mixing assistance
- Maysun Toffiee – engineering assistance (2, 4–8)

== Charts ==
Chart performance for Panorama
Chart (2022)	Peak position
Australian Digital Albums (ARIA)	22
UK Album Downloads (Official Charts)	31
