= Supposed To Be =

Supposed to Be may refer to:

- song by Icon for Hire, 2016
- song by Hayley Kiyoko from the album Panorama, 2022
