= This Side of Paradise (disambiguation) =

This Side of Paradise is the debut novel by F. Scott Fitzgerald.

This Side of Paradise may also refer to:

- This Side of Paradise (album) or the title song, by Ric Ocasek
- This Side of Paradise (EP) or the title song, by Hayley Kiyoko
- "This Side of Paradise" (song), by Bryan Adams
- "This Side of Paradise", a song by Bree Sharp from the film Pokémon: Destiny Deoxys
- "This Side of Paradise", a song by Manfred Mann's Earth Band from The Roaring Silence
- "This Side of Paradise" (Star Trek: The Original Series), a television episode

== See also ==
- The Other Side of Paradise (disambiguation)
