= The Other Side of Paradise =

The Other Side of Paradise may refer to:

- The Other Side of Paradise (film), a 1953 French film
- The Other Side of Paradise (TV series), a 1992 miniseries
- "The Other Side of Paradise", a song by Glass Animals from the 2016 album How to Be a Human Being

== See also ==
- This Side of Paradise (disambiguation)
