= Curious (Hayley Kiyoko song) =

2018 single by Hayley Kiyoko

Single by Hayley Kiyoko

from the album Expectations
- Released: January 11, 2018
- Genre: Dance-pop; R&B; synth-pop
- Length: 3:12
- Label: Empire; Atlantic
- Songwriters: Hayley Kiyoko; Lisa Vitale; Brandon Colbein; Jakob Hazell; Svante Halldin
- Producers: Jack & Coke; Jono Dorr

Hayley Kiyoko singles chronology
"Feelings" (2017)	"Curious" (2018)	"What I Need" (2018)

Music video
- "Curious" on YouTube

"Curious" is a song by American singer and actress Hayley Kiyoko, from her debut studio album Expectations (2018). It was released as the album's third single on January 11, 2018 by Empire/Atlantic Records. Kiyoko co-wrote "Curious" with Lisa Vitale, Brandon Colbein, Jakob Hazell and Svante Halldin, while Jack & Coke (Halldin and Hazell) produced the song. The dance-pop, R&B and synth-pop track details Kiyoko confronting an ex-girlfriend she believes is dating a man to mask her true feelings for Kiyoko. Its title adopts "curious", a term used within the LGBT community to express casual same-sex experimentation, as Kiyoko demands the truth about the authenticity of her love interest's new relationship.

Kiyoko wrote the track based on a past relationship with a closeted woman, as well as various romantic experiences with women who were unsure about their sexuality, hoping the song would encourage open dialogue among queer individuals. "Curious" has earned acclaim from music critics, who praised its production, subversive themes and Kiyoko's confident delivery, often deeming it one of Expectations' strongest tracks; some media publications have ranked the single among the best of 2018. Despite limited radio airplay, "Curious" peaked at number 40 on Billboard's US Mainstream Top 40 chart.

A music video for "Curious" was released the same day as the single, which Kiyoko co-directed with James Larese. Actress Tereza Kacerova co-stars as Kiyoko's former love interest, who she encounters at a house party Kacerova's character is attending with her new boyfriend (Henry Zaga). Critics praised the video's visuals, choreography and Kiyoko's direction, as well as its sensual depiction of a lesbian relationship. Kiyoko has performed "Curious" live several times, including on Jimmy Kimmel Live!, at the 2018 MTV Video Music Awards and during her Expectations Tour. Kiyoko also performed "Curious" with singer Taylor Swift during the latter's Reputation Stadium Tour (2018).

== Background and writing ==
"Curious" was written by Hayley Kiyoko with Lisa Vitale, Brandon Colbein, Jakob Hazell and Svante Halldin. The track was produced by songwriting duo Jack & Coke, which consists of co-writers Hazell and Halldin. Describing herself as very selective when it comes to choosing her collaborators, Kiyoko described working with Jack & Coke as largely incidental because "there’s only a few guest producers on the album" and believes that both artists' strengths can be heard via their production throughout the track. "Curious" covers several of Kiyoko's past relationships with women, as she openly identifies as gay, during which she wanted to clarify that their feelings for each other were genuine as opposed to simply fun. "Curious" is partially based on true events about Kiyoko's "dalliance with a girl on the down-low". Admitting that she shares a personal connection with every song she writes, Kiyoko revealed that "Curious" specifically pertains to "that feeling of learning self-respect and ... walk away from a game". The singer believes any listener would find the situation addressed in the song relatable, claiming everyone has encountered similar dilemmas "where someone's playing games ... In the dating game, the world is difficult, because people don't communicate, or they communicate but then their actions speak louder than words."

Regarding the song's title, Kiyoko explained that the term "curious" "has always had a negative connotation to me" because she finds curious people to be "unsure" about themselves. Believing that everyone longs "to be with someone who knows what they want and ... who they are", Kiyoko attempted to implement such themes into both the song and her album in general. Kiyoko found writing "Curious" an enjoyable process because it "was this ... cheeky fun song where I got to call out" a partner's indecision. Kiyoko claims she knew "Curious" would be a "big song" once she finished recording it, elaborating, "this is what we are looking for. This is what we were missing, is something that’s still honest but really has that backbone of strength, and undeniable hook."

Kiyoko insists that her intention behind writing "Curious" was not to "break the mold (sic)", but simply convey "facts from my life" and encourage open conversation among other queer individuals, explaining, "It’s like, 'Hey, this was a situation I was in and it was effed up. Here you go. Have you been in that same situation? Let’s start a dialogue about it.” "Curious" was released as the third single from Kiyoko's debut album Expectations on January 11, 2018 via Empire Distribution and Atlantic Records, to several digital music retailers and streaming services. The single was also distributed to pop and hot adult contemporary radio formats throughout the United States.

== Music and lyrics ==
"Curious" is a dance-pop, R&B, and synth-pop song, performed over a "bright", synth-pop beat, the bassline of which Rolling Stone likened to a "bouncing-ball". Incorporating electropop and power pop elements with "rubbery" synths, the song lasts three minutes and twelve seconds. Despite seemingly simple instrumentation and refrains, its chorus features a targeted, "rapid-fire" delivery and biting, "faux-casual" lyrics, during which Kiyoko adopts a fast speech pattern and confrontational tone, as her combination of confusion and frustration surfaces. Over a "flirty dance chorus", Kiyoko demands answers from a former partner who has moved on by pursuing a relationship with a man. Kiyoko's website similarly wrote that the song "shuffles from a wild beat towards a shimmering refrain hinging on her charismatic delivery". Simon Miraudo of Student Edge observed that the track exploits the singer's "favourite kind of chorus": "a speedy, trilled lyrical run-up to the song title, delivered deliberately on an isolated and sparse musical bed", followed by "sudden sonic emptiness" reminiscent of an ellipsis in a text conversation. The New York Times music journalist Jon Pareles wrote that the track "rotates through three chords and a hollow beat with a lot of echo in its empty spaces". Despite featuring similar production to previous singles “Feelings” and “Sleepover”, the song's demeanor and Kiyoko's performance are more confident and empowered overall. NPR claims that "When Kiyoko ... assures her love interest not to worry, you know she means it. She's not going to be destroyed by their return to a played-out heteronormativity". Vice writer Avery Stone wrote that "Kiyoko calls out her love interest for being hot-and-cold", citing the track as an example of the album's themes about navigating difficult relationships with girls unable to commit. According to Billboard's Abby Jones, the song "depicts Kiyoko's frustrations with a former love interest who" is now dating a man, neurotically questioning her purpose within the love triangle.

The song's lyrics suggest that Kiyoko is curious to know if the relationship between her ex-girlfriend and her new boyfriend is as serious as the one they once had. Despite being Expectations' most upbeat song, its lyrics nonetheless "carry the same weight" as its other tracks, which USA Today's Patrick Ryan described as "a deceptively bouncy anthem about gay individuals who stay in straight relationships to mask their true feelings". Featuring lyrics about a girl who struggles to accept her feelings for Kiyoko and dates a man to mask their history, Kiyoko confronts her ex about the latter's alleged bi-curiosity. Kiyoko asks her love interest "Are we just friends? You say you wanted me — but you’re sleeping with him", which Spin's Anna Gaca believes "flip[s] the narrative to set up a classic Hayley Kiyoko situation". Questioning if her "ostensibly hetero friend is queer-baiting her", Breanna Belken of The Daily Dot wrote that the singer's lyrics "address the confusion and uncertainty queer women and girls face when pursuing a love interest, in this case a woman who is ambivalent about their relationship." The Guardian's Michael Cragg summarized "Curious" as a song "about being a straight girl’s secret," which he claimed Kiyoko delivers "with a knowing wink". Stone identified its hook as "I’m just curious ... Is it serious?”, which Pitchfork contributor Laura Snapes believes Kiyoko sings with "icy mocking" as the word "curious" adopts a double meaning. The New Statesman writer Myfanwy Craigie elaborated that the title "playfully sets up expectations of a song about bicuriosity" before "our expectations are undercut and 'Curious' is really about her flirtation with a girl who has a boyfriend", ironically questioning the seriousness of her new relationship. Lindsay King-Miller of Lenny Letter agreed that the hook's "feigned nonchalance ... reveals more depths of emotion than a hundred heartbroken torch songs."

Snapes found the song's chorus similar to "New Rules" (2017) by Dua Lipa, while likening its "pin-sharp barbs" to singer Lorde, particularly its chorus "Did you take him to the pier in Santa Monica? Forget to bring your jacket/Wrap up in him ‘cause you wanted to?”, which is a tongue-twister performed in double time. Describing the song as "razor-edged", Rolling Stone's Suzy Exposito opined that few "lines cut as cleanly" as the chorus. King-Miller compared "Curious" to "He’ll Never Love You", another track from Expectations that similarly details a love triangle between Kiyoko competing against a man for the same woman's affections. Meanwhile, Audrey Bowers of Study Breaks likened the track to Kiyoko's "What I Need", a song "about how frustrating it is dating a straight woman because what she needs is for her partner to be sure about their relationship". Lauren Mullineaux of The 405 identified "Curious" as one of the album's most blatant queer song examples. Billboard critic Alexa Shouneyia ranked the lyrics "Calling me up, so late at night/ Are we just friends?/ You say you wanted me, but you're sleeping with him" the album's second most queer lyric, in which the singer "cheekily nods to bi-curiosity." Idolator's Mike Wass found the song's message "about self-respect and knowing when to walk away when someone you care about is playing games" to be empowering.

== Reception ==
=== Critical response ===
"Curious" has garnered acclaim from music critics. In January 2018, Time's Raisa Bruner recommended "Curious" among "5 Songs You Need to Listen to This Week", describing it as a vulnerable "frothy pop confection" the author believes is more socially conscious than Katy Perry’s "I Kissed a Girl" (2008). Gay Times' Nick Levine called the track "super-catchy". The Guardian's Michael Cragg reviewed the song as an excellent "electropop belter", throughout which Kiyoko does "what she does best", while Neil Z. Yeung of AllMusic called it "an endearing gem that chronicles a girl-likes-girl-likes-guy triangle". Abbey Perrin of Affinity Magazine welcomed "Curious" as the single "we’ve all been waiting for", praising Kiyoko's "smooth, effortless vocals". Perrin also observed that although its production "stays true to her earlier releases", the single "features a more confident and empowering vibe [from] Kiyoko [who] stands her ground ... which is refreshing as we have never really seen this from her before."

Several critics cited the track among the album's strongest. Highlighting the track, Spin's Anma Gaca described "Curious" as "Expectations at its best". Laura Snapes of Pitchfork praised the song's lyrics as "a perfectly turned kiss-off", hailing its "brilliant" chorus. Kara Bowen, writing for The Ithacan, crowned the single "the album’s pop pinnacle", while Grammy.com editor Nate Hertweck credits "Curious" with "put[ting] [Expectations] on the map". Recognizing the album's overall theme about subverting expectations, Vice's El Hunt cited "Curious" as a standout track and particularly strong example, explaining, "you almost expect an experimentation pop bop that treats lesbianism as a bit of harmless dabbling" until hearing "a Britney Spears-flavored slab revolving around a more universal scandal". The Harvard Crimson's Allison J. Scharmann agreed that the song is a standout track "bound to have you dancing and singing the hook ... in the exact same tone as Kiyoko for a week after your first listen." Jon Pareles, music critic for The New York Times, named "Curious" "a smart gender twist" on "the classic jealousy song".

Michelle Dreyer, contributing to Study Breaks, observed that although Kiyoko had been releasing music for several years, "Curious" helped many music fans recognize her talent, while BroadwayWorld predicted the single will initiate "another stellar year for" the singer. Idolator critic Mike Nied wrote the song "has become something of a breakout moment for" Kiyoko, expecting the single to "easily find a place on the Hot 100 with the right promotional push." Gemma Samways of the Evening Standard hailed the track as a "slick, smart pop song ... that should pave the way to greater stardom."

=== Accolades ===
Rolling Stone ranked "Curious" the 32nd best song of 2018, with contributor Amanda Charchian believing its chorus demonstrates that Kiyoko is "not above upending the whole structure (musical, romantic, social and otherwise) should things come to that point." NPR ranked "Curious" 2018's 49th best song (out of 100), about which author Marissa Lorusso wrote despite the "joy that comes from reading 'Curious" as a teasing, catchy twist on the homophobic narratives that queer love is a frivolous phase or a sinful path chosen on purpose ... instead, you could just get lost in the song's ultra-glossy production, high-energy chorus and sheer danceability." Billboard's Nina Braca described "Curious" as a "ridiculously catchy" track that boasts the year's most important question: "Did you take him to the pier in Santa Monica/ Forget to bring a jacket, wrap up in him cause you wanted to?" Seventeen's Megan Lasher included the song in her "Ultimate 2018 LGBTQ Pride Playlist", calling it "too catchy to not listen to it at least once a day" and predicting its popularity during pride parades. Elite Daily ranked the song the third best break up song of 2018, for which author Hannah Schneider said Kiyoko "flipped the script on the age-old song about how a person's ex is seeing someone else" by "exud[ing] simultaneous confidence and vulnerability, that is simply contagious."

Describing "Curious" as "extremely catchy," Marianna Rappa of Her Campus deemed the song a "gay anthem" and one of Kiyoko’s most popular songs. The Eagle's Dilpreet Raju agreed that "Curious" is among Kiyoko's most popular songs. Writing for Idolator, Mike Wass crowned the song "One Of The First Great Pop Songs Of 2018", hailing it as a "great addition to the canon of LGBT pop songs with its unusually honest and all-too relatable lyrics", while Rolling Stone wrote that the single "placed her at the forefront of an apologetically queer pop movement".

"Curious" is Kiyoko's most popular and successful single to-date, reaching number 40 on the US Mainstream Top 40 chart and peaking at number 35 on the US Dance/Mix Show Airplay. However, Alexandra Pollard of The Guardian argued that Kiyoko and the song's popularity "bypassed traditional commercial success", observing that the single had only been played once on the radio station Radio 1, as of February 22, 2018.

== Music video ==
=== Background and synopsis ===
The music video for "Curious" was released the same day as the single, January 11, 2018. Before the release, Kiyoko spent several weeks uploading cryptic photographs to her social media accounts. The singer premiered the video on both MTV's Total Request Live and her own YouTube channel. Kiyoko co-directed the video with James Larese. Actress and model Tereza Kacerova co-stars as Kiyoko's love interest, while actor Henry Zaga plays Kacerova's boyfriend. Kacerova had never kissed another girl prior to her role in the video, throughout which other friends and bandmates of Kiyoko were cast. Kiyoko opted to use all-male backup dancers because she had always longed to be in a boy band, comparing the final product to the work of boy band NSYNC. Kiyoko said the video is based on her own life, confirming that she often finds herself pursuing relationships with women who have yet to admit their attraction to women. The singer wanted the video to depict a "cheeky" autobiographical story about "dating a girl and having her say all these things. And then her showing up with another guy". Struggling with her sexuality, Kiyoko's love interest proceeds to be affectionate with her exclusively in private, "so in the music video you see her kind of coming back to me but only in secret. And I'm kind of over it. And I'm just like, hey, you need to respect me 24/7." She described the video as "very close to my life"; Kiyoko wrote a video treatment intending to convey the song's message about "knowing when to walk away when someone you care about is playing games ... in a fun and tongue-in-cheek way", hoping viewers would identify with its message. The cast and crew found filming the opening scene stressful because the sun had begun setting at the same time, forcing them to rush and film the entire sequence in 10 minutes.

The music video revolves around Kiyoko encountering and seducing a former girlfriend at a house party that the latter's new boyfriend is also attending. Kiyoko's love interest initially arrives at the party accompanied by a young man, although she is obviously interested in Kiyoko who ignores her at first. Shots of the two women gazing at each other from across the room are interspersed with flashbacks of their past time together, confirming both their lingering feelings for each other and their former romantic involvement. Towards the end of the video, the girl leads Kiyoko into the bathroom, where they proceed to make out. Kiyoko whispers the song's "curious" hook into the girl's ear, pausing abruptly to ask one final time if she is serious about her new relationship. These scenes are interspersed with sequences of the singer lying on a floor surrounded by several women who caress her body sensually, as well as dance breaks for which she is dressed in sweatpants and a loose-fitting Hawaiian shirt. Kiyoko then defiantly walks away from the girl midway, foregoing the casual hook up and leaving her in the bathroom in favor of returning to the party alone, establishing that Kiyoko is no longer playing games. The video ends implying that Kiyoko has moved on from their "toxic back-and-forth" relationship permanently before her question is answered. Kiyoko explained that "It took me a long time to" become comfortable walking away from situations similar to what her music video character encounters, but believes "It’s important to showcase ... because it’s important to encourage learning self-respect. Games are fun, but at a certain point, it’s like, ‘Okay, when am I compromising myself?".

=== Reception ===
Autostraddle's Mey Valdivia Rude proclaimed that the video "cements" previously conceived notions about Kiyoko's talent, describing "Every scene" as "hot in a different queer way." The author concluded, "It’s like Kiyoko is using every muscle in body and move in her repertoire to drag queerness to the front of her entire music career. It’s a beautiful thing to see and so is this video." HuffPost contributor Noah Michelson appreciated that "The camera doesn’t pan away from the action, nor does the scene play as fuel for some cheap male masturbatory fantasy", describing the singer as "completely in control both on- and off-screen". Glenn Garner of Out wrote that the video helps establish the single's parent album as "a win for gay girls everywhere", while The Fader's Sydney Gore described the visual as "a beautifully shot commentary on the dynamics of queer love and the complicated laws of same-sex attraction." The 405's Lauren Mullineaux identified the video as "where my love affair with Hayley Kiyoko began."

Samantha Puc of TheTempest.co reviewed the piece as "definitely NSFW" but "unapologetically queer from start to finish, and the female gaze is refreshing and appreciated." Sam Manzella, writing for NewNowNext.com, branded the video "as provocative as you’d expect" from Kiyoko. BroadwayWorld wrote that "Curious" "showcases Hayley's confidently slick dance moves". Analyzing the video, Bust contributor Katie O'Brien observed that Kiyoko appears to be "playing with and flipping the prototypical male gaze by placing herself in the on-camera positions one might typically see a man in", in addition to having her backup dancers consist entirely of men (a decision echoed in live performances of the song).

Writing for TMRW Magazine, George Griffiths credits the video's success and popularity online with helping establish "Curious" as "a true viral cross-over success", describing it as a "brilliant" and "evocative" piece that boasts the year's "best dance routine". Within a few hours of release, the music video accumulated over 200,000 views, and more than one million views by January 17, 2018. The video amassed nine million views within three months of release, and 13.7 million by August 2018. As of 2020, the video has reached more than 26 million views on YouTube.

== Live performances ==
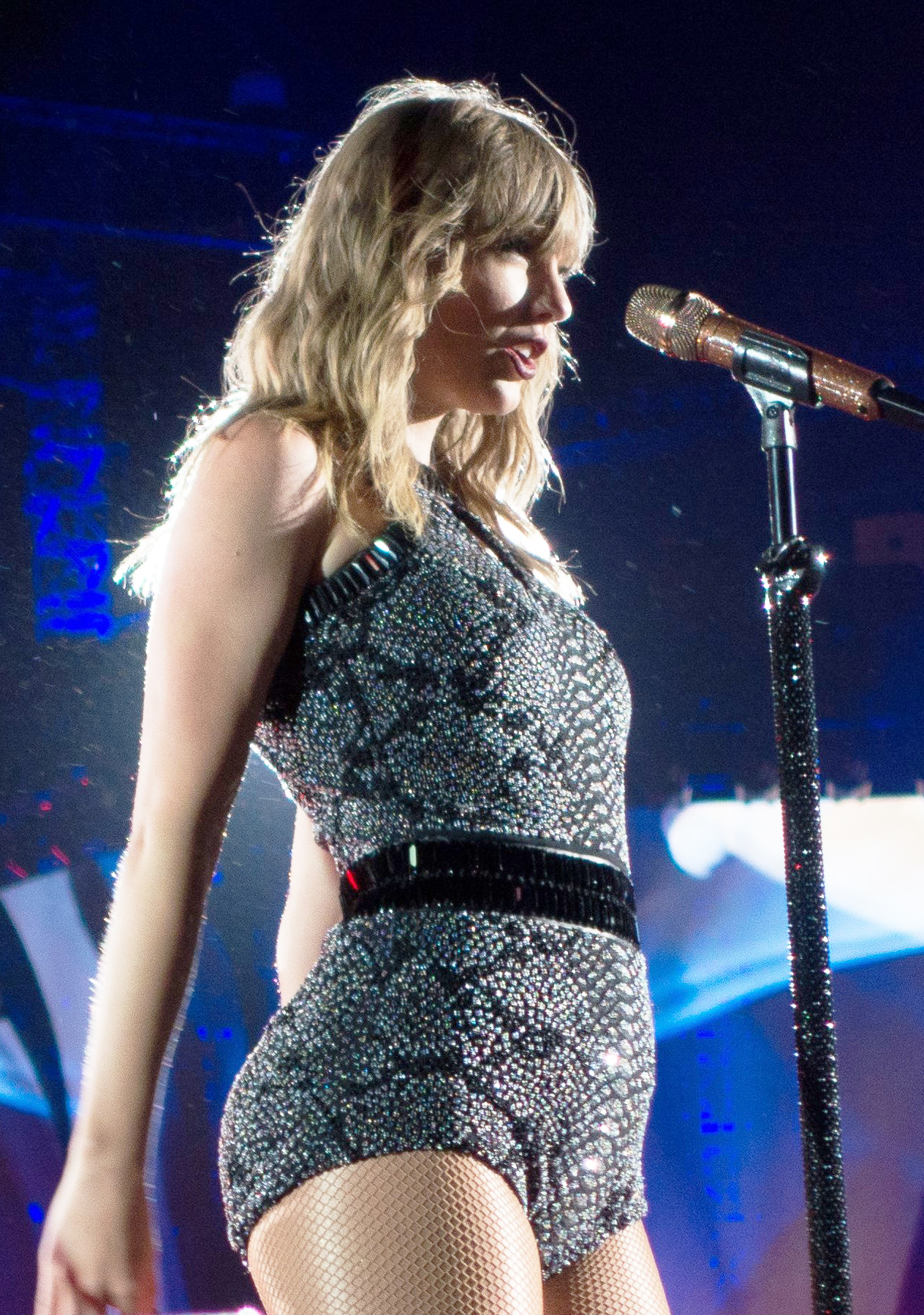
Kiyoko performed "Curious" with Taylor Swift (pictured) during the latter's Reputation Stadium Tour, becoming Kiyoko's first stadium performance.

Kiyoko sang "Curious" on Jimmy Kimmel Live! on April 3, 2018, the same evening as her 27th birthday. The performance was part of Kimmel's concert series sponsored by Mercedes-Benz and served as Kiyoko's late-night television debut. Accompanied by four male backup dancers, Kiyoko performed hip-hop choreography, in front of a live band. Idolator's Mike Nied praised Kiyoko's "strong live vocal[s]", "fierce choreography" and "seemingly bottomless energy." In August 2018, Kiyoko performed the song at the 2018 MTV Video Music Awards, at which she had been nominated for Best New Artist and won the ceremony's Push Artist of the Year. Patrick Crowley of Billboard wrote Kiyoko demonstrated her performance skills by showcasing "signature dripping-in-swagger dance moves", accompanied by backup dancers.

Singer Taylor Swift invited Kiyoko to sing "Curious" during the Foxborough, MA stop of her Reputation Stadium Tour (2018) at Gillette Stadium. Swift had previously defended Kiyoko from fans who misinterterpred the latter's comments about facing homophobia in the music industry, in which she compared herself to Swift who frequently sings about men without facing criticism about unoriginality. Kiyoko had originally planned on attending Swift's concert while in Boston performing with Panic at the Disco. Swift asked Panic at the Disco's management if Kiyoko would perform "Curious" at her next show, to which she agreed. The singers only blocked their performance during soundcheck earlier the same day, during which their strong chemistry was noted. The performance, which was kept secret from Swift's audience, included dancers and pyrotechnics. The duet was Kiyoko's first stadium performance, after which she thanked Swift on Instagram. Sam Manzella of NewNowNext.com reviewed the duet as "show-stopping". Fans of both singers reacted positively on social media. The Los Angeles Times' Ilana Kaplan wrote that the duet indicated Kiyoko's growth as a celebrity. Kiyoko considered the performance beneficial to the LGBT community, elaborating that the duet surpassed solely Swift's gesture: "I think for her demographic and for what she does, that was a very important moment. That’s why I feel like that was just a once-in-a-lifetime opportunity".

Kiyoko performed the song throughout her European Encore Tour, an extension of the European leg of her Expectations Tour (2018-2019). Reviewing her performance at London’s O2 Forum Kentish Town in February 2019, Lewis Corner of Gay Times identified "Curious" as the song on which "she gears into full superstar mode", describing it as "a sparkly example of everything we love about pop music." The Strand Magazine's Sophie Perry wrote that Kiyoko "gave it all she had in every dance move and lyric, with the crowd’s energy responding ten-fold." Gemma Samways of the Evening Standard found the singer a "at her best when keeping the rock cliches at arm’s length," citing "Curious" as an example.

== Chart performance ==
Chart (2018)	Peak position
US Dance Airplay (Billboard)	37
US Pop Airplay (Billboard)	40

== Release history ==
Region	Date	Format	Label	Ref.
Various	January 11, 2018	Digital download; streaming	Empire; Atlantic	
United States	January 11, 2018	Contemporary hit radio	Empire; Atlantic	
