= For the Girls (song) =

Single by Hayley Kiyoko

from the album Panorama
- Released: May 20, 2022
- Genre: Pop
- Length: 2:38
- Label: Atlantic
- Songwriters: Hayley Kiyoko; Marcus Lomax; Michelle Buzz; Oliver Peterhof
- Producer: German

Hayley Kiyoko singles chronology
"Cherry" (2021)	"For the Girls" (2022)	"Deep in the Woods" (2022)

Music video
- "For the Girls" on YouTube

"For the Girls" is a song by American singer and actress Hayley Kiyoko. It was released on May 20, 2022, through Atlantic Records, as the third single from her second studio album Panorama.

== Background and release ==
"For the Girls" was released on May 20, 2022, through Atlantic Records, as the third single from her album Panorama.

== Composition ==
"For the Girls" is a guitar-driven, electro-tinged pop track, which has also been described as bass-boosted. In her review for the song's parent album, Panorama, Emma Madden said that "For the Girls" was a summery song that is led by percussion. The chorus contains influences of pop music as Kiyoko's ad-libs on the song are high-energy. The song is an empowerment anthem for the LGBT community.

== Music video ==
In the music video accompanying "For the Girls", Kiyoko parodies The Bachelorette, with Bachelor contestant and Kiyoko's girlfriend Becca Tilley appearing at the end of the video, and winning the parody of the reality show. Brittany Spanos of Rolling Stone noted that the clip features the drama usually present in episodes of the aforementioned television series, with "screaming, tearful fights and lots of kissing". Kiyoko's father makes a cameo appearance in the video as the driver of a limousine.

Following the release of the music video, which was self directed by Kiyoko, she and Tilley revealed they had been in a long-term relationship for four years. While casting the video, Kiyoko aimed for a full cast of queer people. Abby Monteil of Them called the video "Kiyoko's queerest music video yet".

== Credits ==
Credits adapted from Spotify.

- Hayley Kiyoko — performer, songwriter
- German — producer
- Marcus Lomax — songwriter
- Michelle Buzz — songwriter
- Oliver Peterhof — songwriter
