= I'm Too Sensitive for This Shit =

2020 EP by Hayley Kiyoko

EP by Hayley Kiyoko
- Released: January 14, 2020
- Length: 14:44
- Labels: Empire; Atlantic
- Producers: Kill Dave; Patrick Morrissey; Jason Evigan; Hayley Kiyoko

Hayley Kiyoko chronology
Expectations (2018)	I'm Too Sensitive for This Shit (2020)	Panorama (2022)

Singles from I'm Too Sensitive for This Shit
- 1. "I Wish" Released: July 19, 2019; 2. "Demons" Released: October 11, 2019; 3. "L.O.V.E. Me" Released: November 15, 2019; 4. "Runaway" Released: December 13, 2019; 5. "She" Released: January 14, 2020

I'm Too Sensitive for This Shit is the fourth extended play by American singer and actress Hayley Kiyoko. Originally set to be released October 11, 2019 and later December 12, 2019, it was eventually released January 14, 2020 via Empire Distribution and Atlantic Records.

I'm Too Sensitive for This Shit came out single by single, being the EP's release date the same day as the last one was unveiled. It was preceded by the singles "I Wish", "Demons", "L.O.V.E. Me", "Runaway" and "She".

== Track listing ==
No.	Title	Writer(s)	Producer(s)	Length
1.	"Demons"	Hayley Kiyoko; Brandon Colbein; David Dahlquist; Marcus Lomax; Patrick Morrissey; Paul Phamous	Kill Dave; Morrissey; Kiyoko	2:59
2.	"L.O.V.E. Me"	Kiyoko; Bibi Bourelly; Dahlquist; Morrissey	Kill Dave; Morrissey; Kiyoko	2:39
3.	"Runaway"	Kiyoko; Dahlquist; Lomax; Morrissey	Kill Dave; Morrissey; Kiyoko	2:30
4.	"I Wish"	Bourelly; Jason Evigan; Morrissey; Charlotte Aitchison^{[a]}; Noonie Bao^{[a]}; Scott Harris^{[a]}	Evigan; Morrissey	3:25
5.	"She"	Kiyoko; Colbein; Dahlquist; Jono Dorr; Morrissey	Kill Dave; Morrissey; Kiyoko	3:11
Total length:				14:44

Notes

- "I Wish" is an original composition from Jason Evigan that was previously used when producing the original demo for the unreleased song "I Wish" by Charli XCX. Therefore, in some instances, Charli XCX, Noonie Bao and Scott Harris are listed as uncredited writers.
