= Citrine (EP) =

2016 album by Hayley Kiyoko

EP by Hayley Kiyoko
- Released: September 30, 2016
- Genre: Pop; electropop
- Length: 18:33
- Label: Empire; Atlantic
- Producer: 4e; Dan Book; Bram Inscore

Hayley Kiyoko chronology
This Side of Paradise (2015)	Citrine (2016)	Expectations (2018)

Singles from Citrine
- 1. "Gravel to Tempo" Released: August 5, 2016; 2. "One Bad Night" Released: October 11, 2016

Citrine is the third extended play (EP) by American singer and actress Hayley Kiyoko. It was released on September 30, 2016, through Empire Distribution and Atlantic Records.

== Background ==
The EP is called Citrine because Kiyoko wears a citrine crystal, which she believes is of benefit to her wellbeing.

== Composition ==
The EP has a total duration of 18 minutes and 33 seconds. The project is described as "[a collection of] electropop love songs." Kiyoko named the release of it as the moment where she really felt she found her sound and who she was. During an interview, Kiyoko stated that the opening track and lead single on the EP, "Gravel to Tempo" is about "realizing that the only validation you need in life is from yourself," and that she chose high school as the setting because "it's a pivotal moment in [one's] life where [one] naturally develop[s] insecurities." "Pretty Girl", one of Kiyoko's favorite songs on the release, describes her at appreciating how beautiful a girl who comes across is, something she wouldn't share in real life, while "Palace", the final track on the EP, was referred as the most powerful song, lyrically, in which, the theme is mourning someone's loss positively.

== Promotion ==
The EP was preceded by the release of the lead single "Gravel to Tempo" on August 5, 2016, along a music video that premiered on Refinery29 before being listed publicly to YouTube and Vevo, a method she followed with all of her videos from this EP so far. The single was her first major label release with Atlantic. The track "Pretty Girl" was released one day before the EP, and premiered on Paper. The official music video of the song "One Bad Night" premiered on Vice on October 11, 2016. The self-directed music video stars transgender personality Erin Armstrong and American actor Kelvin Harrison Jr and explores a story about human compassion. On October 20, Kiyoko performed on MTV's Wonderland. On February 16, 2017, a remix to promote the song "Palace" by producer Justin Caruso was premiered via PopMatters and properly released on digital retailers the day after.

To support the EP, Kiyoko embarked on the One Bad Night Tour starting on November 2, 2016, with support from the band ARIZONA.

== Track listing ==
All tracks are produced by 4e and Dan Book, except where noted

No.	Title	Writer(s)	Producer(s)	Length
1.	"Gravel to Tempo"	Hayley Kiyoko; Cecil Bernardy; Jonathan Dorr		3:39
2.	"Ease My Mind"	Kiyoko; Nicole Morier; Bernardy; Dorr		3:20
3.	"Pretty Girl"	Kiyoko; Dorr; Dan Keyes		3:37
4.	"One Bad Night"	Kiyoko; Nikki Flores; Bram Inscore	Inscore; Book	3:56
5.	"Palace"	Kiyoko; Flores; Bernardy; Dorr		4:01
Total length:				18:33

== Charts ==
Chart (2016)	Peak position
New Zealand Heatseekers Albums (RMNZ)	6
US Top Heatseekers Albums (Billboard)	4
