= Hayley Kiyoko =

American actress (born 1991)

- Born: Hayley Kiyoko Alcroft; April 3, 1991 (age 35); Los Angeles, California, U.S.
- Occupations: Actress; musician; singer; author; director
- Years active: 2007–present
- Works: Discography
- Partner(s): Becca Tilley (2018–present; engaged)
- Parents: Jamie Alcroft (father); Sarah Kawahara (mother)
- Musical career
- Genres: Dream pop; electropop; dance-pop; synth-pop
- Instruments: Vocals; drums; guitar; bass; keyboards
- Labels: Empire; Atlantic
- Formerly of: The Stunners
- Website: www.hayleykiyokoofficial.com

Hayley Kiyoko Alcroft (born April 3, 1991) is an American actress, musician and author. She first became known through the films Scooby-Doo! The Mystery Begins (2009) and Disney Channel's Lemonade Mouth (2011), and recurring roles in television's Wizards of Waverly Place (2010) and The Fosters (2014). In 2026, she made her feature film directorial debut with Girls Like Girls, released by Focus Features and produced by Marc Platt, bringing her acclaimed story to the big screen and establishing her as a multidisciplinary creative voice across literature, film, and music.

Kiyoko has released four solo extended plays: A Belle to Remember (2013), This Side of Paradise (2015), which includes the hit single "Girls Like Girls", Citrine (2016), and I'm Too Sensitive For This Shit (2020). Following the singles "Sleepover", "Feelings", and "Curious", she released her debut studio album Expectations (2018) which reached the top 20 of the charts in the United States, Canada, and Australia, followed by her second studio album Panorama (2022). Her third studio album, girls like girls the album, (2026) was released alongside her feature film of the same name.

In 2023, Kiyoko released her first novel, Girls Like Girls, published by Wednesday Books, which debuted at number one on the New York Times Best Sellers list for Young Adult Hardcover, and won the Goldie Award for Young Adult Fiction by the Golden Crown Literary Society. The novel inspired the 2026 film of the same name, which Kiyoko directed and co-wrote. In 2025, Kiyoko released her second young adult novel, Where There’s Room For Us, which also debuted on the New York Times Bestseller list for Young Adult Hardcover. She has also created a comic book, with the help of Naomi Franquiz and Marla Vazquez, based on her song "Gravel to Tempo".

== Early life ==
Hayley Kiyoko Alcroft was born on April 3, 1991, in Los Angeles, California, to Canadian figure skater and choreographer Sarah Kawahara and actor/comedian Jamie Alcroft. Her mother is of Japanese ancestry and her father is from Ohio and has English and Scottish ancestry. Kiyoko has two siblings, Alysse and Thatcher.

Kiyoko was discovered at the age of five when she went with her friend to a photoshoot. The director asked her to step in front of the camera, and she ended up in a national print ad for KnowledgeWare. She began acting at a young age, appearing in national commercials for brands such as GM Onstar, Slim Jim, and Cinnamon Toast Crunch. Insisting on drum lessons at age six, she was writing drum charts for new releases and selling them in a local music store by age 11. At age 8, Kiyoko wrote a song called "Notice," which her father has always urged her to release. She was elected student council president of her middle school and high school freshman classes and vice-president in her senior year. She attended Agoura High School and graduated in 2009. She was appointed "Commissioner of Entertainment" in her sophomore year and "Commissioner of Pep Rallies" in her junior year.

She created and choreographed "The Agoura High Step Team" which was faculty-approved as a school club under her direction. The team placed third at a Nationals competition in 2009. Upon graduation, she was accepted into Clive Davis School of Recorded Music at New York University but initially deferred until eventually declining due to career opportunities.

Children's cable TV network Nickelodeon spotted her at the Culver City Ice Rink, and she ended up featured in and narrating a short piece about children in sports called, "I'm Hayley, a Skater". Kiyoko continued to hone her skills in middle school plays and, in seventh grade, asked for an agent after seeing Eurasian girls like herself act in JCPenney commercials. She got her commercial agent and booked her first audition, claiming acting was always just something she did on the side to make money for college and music equipment. Kiyoko started the garage band Hede, named after her grandfather, in November 2007 and released five songs on Myspace and a music video for "Warehouse". The band performed locally on several occasions and split in 2009 after the remaining band members left for college. Her grandfather died in 2011. He was one of the biggest inspirations in Kiyoko's life.

== Career ==
=== 2007–2014: Career beginnings, The Stunners and television films ===
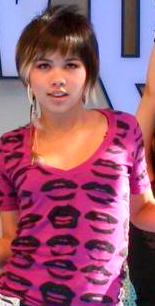
Kiyoko performing as part of the Stunners in 2009

In 2007, Kiyoko was approached by former pop-star Vitamin C to join an all-girl singing and dancing group. She joined Allie Gonino, Tinashe, Kelsey Sanders (later replaced by Lauren Hudson), and Marisol Esparza to form The Stunners. Six months after forming, the group signed with Columbia Records and released a single titled "Bubblegum" to iTunes along with the official video for the single. They also contributed a cover of the song "Let's Hear It for the Boy" to the iCarly soundtrack. In 2009, the group left Columbia Records, signed a production deal with Lions Gate Entertainment, and shot a music video for their promo single "We Got It", which was released on February 22, 2010. In 2007, Kiyoko starred in her first television role in Unfabulous, being credited as Hayley Alcroft. After graduating high school in 2009, Kiyoko booked her first big film, starring as Velma Dinkley in Scooby-Doo! The Mystery Begins, a role she almost did not audition for as she had never seen an asian Velma before. In a 2017 interview, she stated she struggles to find acting roles as a biracial woman. The film premiered on September 13, 2009, and was a huge success. It brought in 6.1 million viewers, making it the most-watched program in Cartoon Network's history. She reprised the role in the film's sequel, Scooby-Doo! Curse of the Lake Monster, which premiered on October 16, 2010. The sequel drew 3.4 million viewers. In 2010, Kiyoko also guest starred in four episodes of Disney's Wizards of Waverly Place in the role of Stevie Nichols, an evil wizard.

The Stunners signed to Universal Republic Records in 2010 and released their first single "Dancin' Around the Truth", which featured the New Boyz. The music video for the song premiered June 2, just before the group was announced as an opening act on Justin Bieber's My World Tour. A full album was planned, but cancelled when the group split in 2011. Kiyoko claimed that she wanted to be in control of her own music. Kiyoko began work on the Disney Channel film Lemonade Mouth in 2010, starring in a lead role as rebellious teenager Stella Yamada. The film premiered on April 15, 2011, with 5.7 million viewers. Kiyoko later guest starred in the episode "Skater Girl Island" of Disney XD's Zeke and Luther which aired May 23, 2011. A sequel to Lemonade Mouth was cancelled prior to pre-production when Disney released a statement saying that "they felt the movie had completed its story within the first film."

In February 2012, Kiyoko landed a small role in Blue Lagoon: The Awakening, a Lifetime film and remake of the 1980 film The Blue Lagoon, which premiered on June 16, 2012. She portrayed the character Gabi in a recurring role on ABC Family's The Fosters and later landed the role of Raven Ramirez in CSI: Cyber. She also portrayed Shannie in the Netflix film XOXO, which premiered in August 2016.

On March 12, 2013, Kiyoko released her debut EP, A Belle to Remember. The project was partially crowdfunded through MusicPledge. Immediately following its release, Kiyoko began writing new music in London with British producer James Flannigan. The songs were recorded in her parents' garage in Los Angeles with Flannigan. Kiyoko also collaborated with Swedish producer Anders Grahn. During this time, Kiyoko was affiliated with Maker Studios, releasing covers of "Jolly Old Saint Nicholas" and medleys of Valentine's Day themed songs on the Maker Music YouTube channel with AJ Rafael.

=== 2015–2018: Record deal, EPs, and Expectations ===
Her second EP, This Side of Paradise, was released on February 3, 2015. The music video for her single "Girls Like Girls" was released on June 24, 2015. After co-directing the video for "Girls Like Girls" (which as of November 2026 has over 165 million views), Kiyoko assumed full directorial responsibilities for her next music video. "Cliff's Edge" was released via Vevo in November 2015.

After her 25th birthday party, Kiyoko suffered a concussion and was concurrently diagnosed with post-concussion syndrome and depression. In a 2018 interview, Kiyoko said "I couldn't create, and I was like 'If I can't create, what's the point? I have no purpose.'" She started resting with citrine pieces on her forehead and started using a citrine crystal, which inspired the name for her third EP. In 2016, she released her single "Gravel to Tempo" and accompanying music video from her next EP, Citrine. The EP was released on September 30, 2016, via EMPIRE and Atlantic. Her third fully self-directed music video for the song "One Bad Night" was premiered via Vice on October 11, 2016, in order to promote the EP. A new single called "Sleepover" was released alongside its music video on March 2, 2017, via BuzzFeed. Following that, the self-directed one-shot music video for her single "Feelings" was released on October 19, 2017. On December 21, 2017, Kiyoko announced her debut studio album, Expectations. The third single, "Curious" was released on January 11, 2018, with the album's pre-order, alongside its music video, directed by Kiyoko and James Larese, and which premiered on Total Request Live. In March, Kiyoko was announced as a supporting act for the first leg of Panic! at the Disco's Pray for the Wicked Tour.

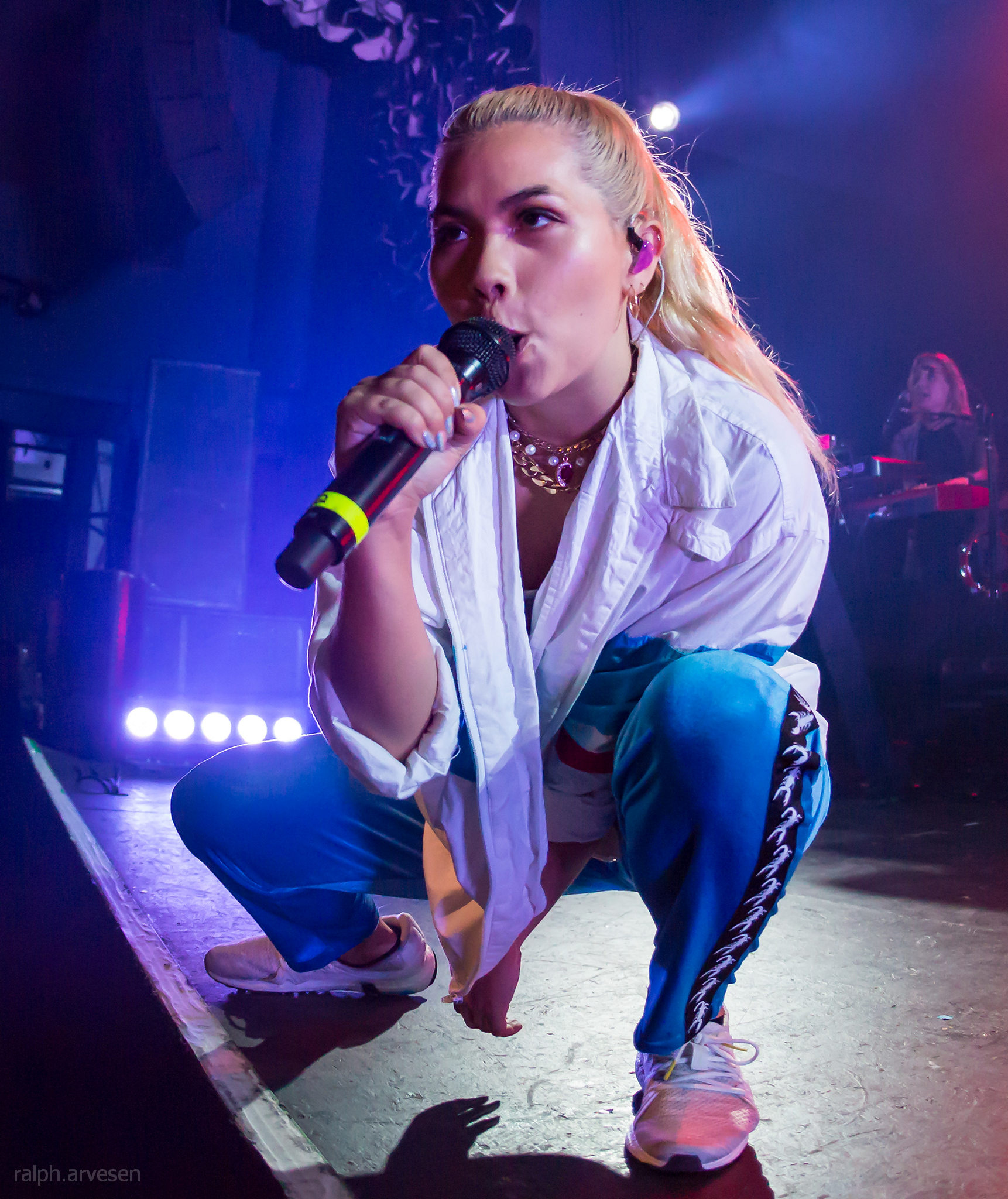
Kiyoko performing in Austin, Texas, on May 7, 2018

Expectations was released on March 30, 2018. Kiyoko made her live TV debut and performed "Curious" on Jimmy Kimmel Live! on April 3, 2018. Later that month, she announced that she collaborated with Marla Vazquez and Naomi Franquiz to make a comic book based on her song, "Gravel to Tempo." The comic book was sold during the Expectations Tour. Her self-directed music video for "What I Need," featuring Kehlani, was released on May 31, 2018. In June, Kiyoko performed "He'll Never Love You (HNLY)" on Late Night with Seth Meyers. Later in June, Kiyoko was featured in InStyle's first issue of 50 Badass Women for her work alongside notable figures such as Ruth Bader Ginsburg and Emma Watson. On July 26, 2018, Kiyoko was invited to perform "Curious" on stage with Taylor Swift during her Reputation Tour at Gillette Stadium, marking Kiyoko's first stadium performance. The performance video for "What I Need" was released on August 17, 2018. At the 2018 MTV Video Music Awards, Kiyoko won the award for Push Artist of the Year and performed "Curious" on stage.

=== 2019–2022: I'm Too Sensitive for This Shit and Panorama ===
In June 2019, Kiyoko appeared in Taylor Swift's music video for "You Need to Calm Down" with other LGBTQ+ celebrities. Kiyoko released her next EP, I'm Too Sensitive for This Shit, on January 14, 2020, which was preceded by singles "I Wish" on July 18, 2019, "Demons" on October 11, "L.O.V.E. Me" on November 15, and "Runaway" on December 13. The track "She" was released as the fifth and final single on the same day as the EP. On August 8, 2020, she was featured on AhhHaa's remix of AJR's song "Bang!". Her “I’m Too Sensitive For This Shit” tour was cancelled in 2020 due to the pandemic. On June 23, 2021, "Demons" was featured in the third episode of the Disney+ TV series Loki.

On April 30, 2021, Kiyoko released "Found My Friends" as the lead single from her second studio album Panorama. The second single from the album, "Chance", was released on June 1, 2021. On November 17, 2021, Kiyoko released a collaboration with Fletcher titled "Cherry". Her second album, Panorama, was released on July 29, 2022.

In April 2022, Lauv announced tour dates in support of his album All 4 Nothing. Kiyoko was announced as the opener for the 28 tour dates planned across North America. The tour began on August 11, 2022, in Minneapolis, Minnesota and concluded on September 20, in Seattle, Washington.

On May 20, 2022, Kiyoko released "For the Girls" as the third single from Panorama. The accompanying music video was directed by Kiyoko as a parody of The Bachelorette, featuring an all queer cast. At the end of the video, Kiyoko's relationship with former Bachelor contestant Becca Tilley was confirmed publicly for the first time.

=== 2023–2025: GLAAD nomination, single releases and Panorama Tour ===
In recognition of her sophomore album, Panorama, Kioyoko was nominated for a 2023 GLAAD Media Award for Outstanding Music Artist, in January 2023.

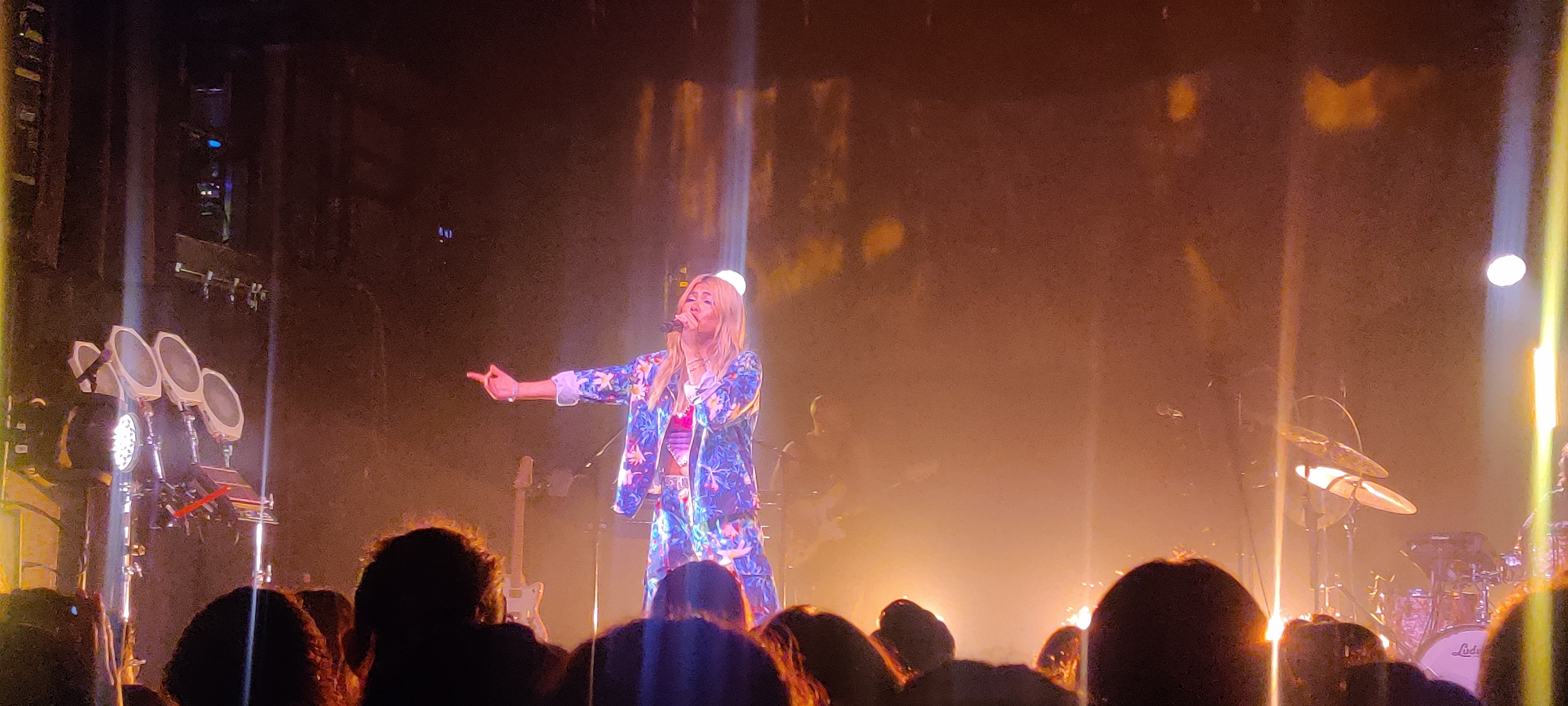
Kiyoko at Irving Plaza, New York City, on the Panorama Tour, in May 2023.

On January 21, 2023, Kiyoko announced a headlining tour in support of her 2022 album, Panorama. 33 tour dates were announced across Europe and North America, with a second night in New York City added due to demand. The tour began in Glasgow, UK on April 5, 2023, and concluded in Silver Spring, Maryland on June 2, 2023.

On March 3, 2023, Steve Aoki released the single, "Hungry Heart" with Galantis, featuring lyrics and vocals from Kiyoko. The music video, directed by Kiyoko, accompanied the release and featured Kiyoko, Aoki and Becca Tilley, Kiyoko's now fianceé. The song became the number one most played dance track at over 2,500 U.S. and Canadian radio stations, satellite radio and music television monitored by Mediabase on June 19, 2023.

Kiyoko's single "Greenlight" was released on May 24, 2023, and premiered as part of the setlist on the Panorama tour.

On June 21, 2023, Kiyoko released "Somewhere Between the Sand and the Stardust", a "heartfelt and emotional track" around the emotions felt by those dealing with a loved one taking their own life.

=== 2015—2026: Girls Like Girls: The song, the music video, the book, the album, the movie ===
In October 2022, Kiyoko announced on her social media accounts that she had expanded upon her 2015 single "Girls Like Girls" and the characters from its accompanying music video to create a YA novel of the same name. The book was published in multiple territories worldwide and was released in the US on May 30, 2023. During its first week of release, it became number one on The New York Times best seller list for Young Adult Hardcover and stayed on the list for seven consecutive weeks and has since been translated into five languages.

On June 1, 2023, Kiyoko released the audiobook for her debut novel, Girls Like Girls, featuring the voices of Kiyoko, Natalie Naudus, Malia Pyles, Brandon Flynn and Katie Gavin of MUNA.

A film adaptation, written by Kiyoko and Stefanie Scott, went into production in 2024. Focus Features acquired worldwide rights to the film adaptation in December 2024.

On December 17, 2025, the theatrical release date was confirmed on social media for June 19, 2026.

On February 10, 2026, the Girls Like Girls trailer was released, racking up 29.9 million combined views on Instagram, TikTok and YouTube (as of November 2026).

On March 4, Hayley announced she was releasing a new movie tie-in edition of her debut novel, Girls Like Girls. The cover featured a still from the film of Coley (Maya DaCosta) and Sonya (Myra Molloy). Inside featured behind-the-scenes photos from set, along with a personal note from Hayley.

girls like girls the album (2026)

On April 22, Kiyoko announced her third studio album, girls like girls the album, would be released alongside her directorial debut. Each of the songs on the album were inspired by scenes and themes from her film with several queer artists featured, some of whom were inspired by Kiyoko’s work. The first single, “collide” featuring Gigi Perez, was released that same day. At Coachella Music Festival the previous week, Perez invited Kiyoko on stage as a surprise guest to perform “Girls Like Girls” together, where the two announced the single and lyric video dropping the following week.

On May 13, Kiyoko released her second single and lyric video from the forthcoming project, “red bikini” featuring Snow Wife, which inspired the album cover.

On May 26, she released her third single, “girls like girls (from the motion picture),” a reimagining of the original single (2015) with an orchestra. This version was also featured in the credits of Girls Like Girls.

Hayley’s third studio album, girls like girls the album, was released in full on June 12, 2026. The remaining features on the project include Chelsea Cutler, August Ponthier, Young Miko, Joy Oladokun, and Tegan & Sara. The album also features the song “notice,” the song she finished for this project that her father has always urged her to release.

The film debuted on June 19, 2026 with over 500 screens in the United States and Canada. Kiyoko attended a special screening with fans and loved ones earlier that week at Universal CityWalk AMC. It also premiered at Frameline Film Festival.

“The hope is a queer kid in a red state or someone who has felt alone in their experience, even if they’re not queer, that they’ll feel seen,” she said. Kiyoko now aims to make a career behind the camera her primary one, directing movies and TV shows and also creating their accompanying soundtracks. She would like to adapt for the screen her 2025 novel, “Where There’s Room for Us,” which is set in an alternate reality of Victorian England. And she might find a way to give “Girls Like Girls” yet another iteration: “I actually would love it to be a musical,” she said. “That would be a dream.” Kiyoko reflected on what she hoped would be the legacy of “Girls Like Girls.” “This is not a thing that goes away; this is who we are,” she said. “I think that’s my goal in life: to normalize our experiences.”

Since its national debut, Girls Like Girls has been released theatrically in Thailand, Germany, Singapore, United Kingdom, Ireland, and Brazil.

== Personal life ==
=== Sexuality and musical influence ===
Kiyoko is a lesbian. She has stated that she knew she was attracted to girls when she was six years old, coming out to her parents in the sixth grade. Upon realizing she liked girls, she grew up struggling with those feelings, fearing rejection and judgment if she came out. Kiyoko wanted to inspire confidence in young people dealing with the same struggles. Kiyoko's music is focused on her story and emotions she has experienced while coming to terms with her identity. The "This Side of Paradise" music video focuses on her struggles with expressing her true self and the "Gravel to Tempo" music video draws on her experiences with having crushes on girls while growing up. In a 2016 interview, she expressed her frustration about not connecting to people the way she wanted. When Lily May-Young, one of the co-writers for "Girls Like Girls", asked Kiyoko what was something about herself that no one else knew and that she was afraid to sing about, Kiyoko said she wanted to sing about how she likes girls, but was struggling to be out about that. Tegan and Sara and Katy Perry's "I Kissed a Girl" were Kiyoko's turning point and inspiration to turn to pop music. Through her music, Kiyoko works to normalize lesbian relationships in a society and music industry that she sees as being very heteronormative:

"If you see two girls falling in love and normalizing that, then [people] can go, 'I can fall in love, too. I can be that person. I can look like that. I can get a girl that looks like that.' If they see that, then they can believe it. It's just how we are."

After seeing the impact her music has on her fans, Kiyoko has stated that she regretted not being open about her sexuality sooner.

Since April 2018, Kiyoko has been dating former Bachelor contestant Becca Tilley. The couple initially kept their relationship private and confirmed it in May 2022 after Tilley appeared in Kiyoko's music video "For the Girls", which is inspired by The Bachelor. Prior to this, Tilley used the nickname "95p" to refer to Kiyoko when talking about the relationship on Tilley's podcast Scrubbing In. Hayley appears on the podcast on September 19, 2022, with the episode "A Deep Scrub: Hayley Kiyoko". On July 10, 2025, Kiyoko and Tilley announced that they are engaged, with Kiyoko proposing to Tilley. Later, on the same day, on an episode of iHeartRadio's Scrubbing In with Becca Tilley & Tanya Rad podcast, they said the engagement happened a week before in a nudist beach in Mallorca, Spain.

Kiyoko's song "Mercy/Gatekeeper" talks about the depression she dealt with after suffering from her concussion.

=== LGBT advocacy ===
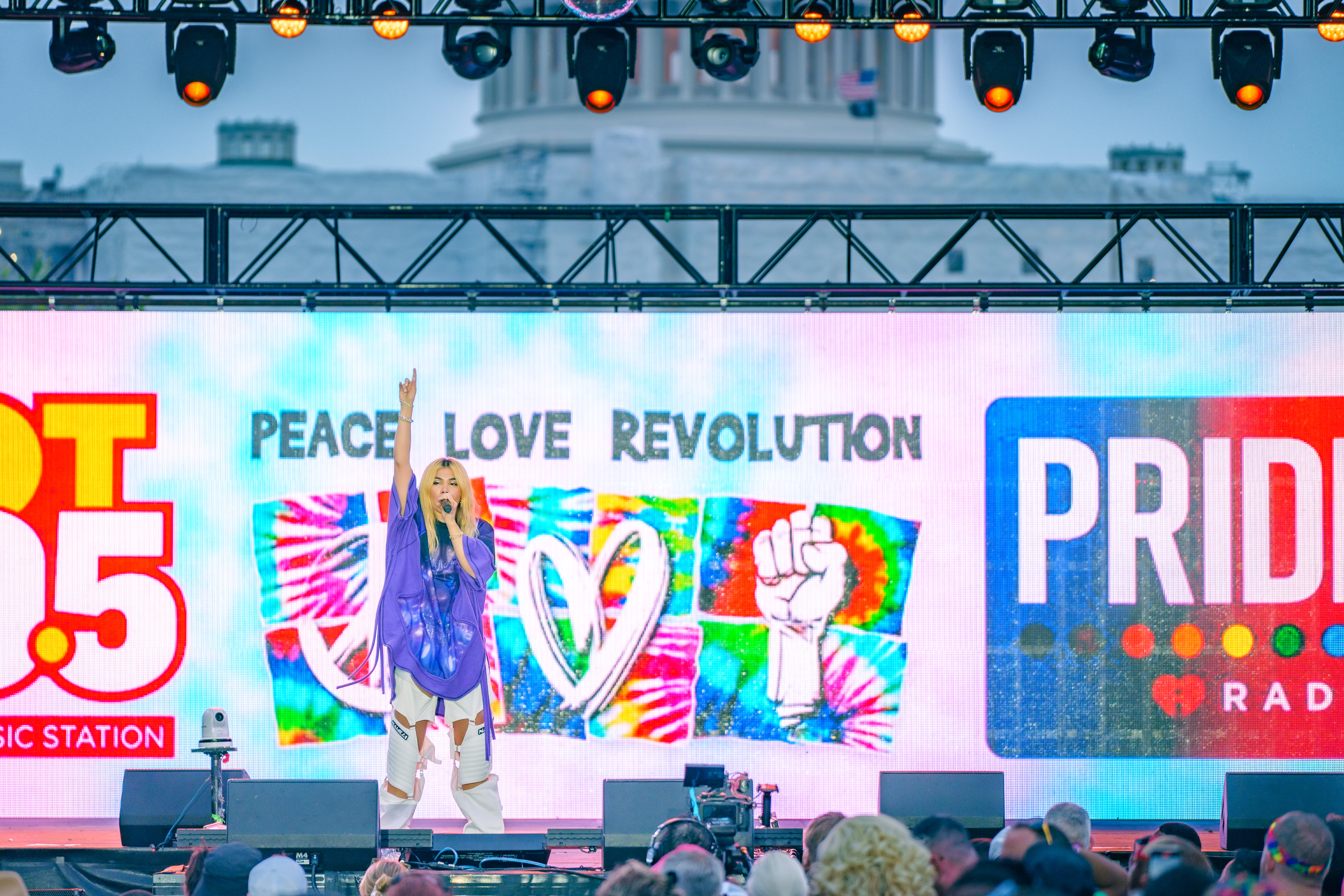
Kiyoko performing at the 2023 Capital Pride concert in Washington, D.C., with the United States Capitol in the background.

Since publicly coming out, Kiyoko has been an advocate for LGBT rights and is widely considered to be a gay icon by her fans, who have nicknamed her 'Lesbian Jesus'. Her music videos highlight her own experiences and various LGBT-related issues. The music video for "One Bad Night" raised awareness of violence against transgender women. For Pride Month 2017, Kiyoko partnered with MeUndies to promote their "Celebrate" campaign. Each pair of underwear sold had a portion of the profit donated to the Los Angeles LGBT Center. In 2018, Kiyoko critiqued Rita Ora's song, "Girls", for its depiction of same-sex attraction and harmful implications for the LGBT community. Ora later apologized for the song's implications. After 78 bras were thrown at Kiyoko during the Expectations Tour, she and Neara Russell donated them to I Support The Girls, an organization that supports homeless women, to support homeless LGBT youth. In her acceptance speech for Push Artist of the Year at the 2018 MTV Video Music Awards, Kiyoko dedicated her win to queer women of color. She marched in a Pride parade for the first time, attending the 2019 World Pride Parade in New York City as the float ambassador for W Hotels Worldwide.

=== Politics ===
In 2016, she supported Hillary Clinton and expressed dismay at Donald Trump winning the U.S. Presidential Election. In 2018, Kiyoko was praised by HeadCount for helping her fans to register to vote while she was supporting Panic! at the Disco's Pray for the Wicked Tour. She endorsed Joe Biden for the 2020 United States presidential election in a tweet following Biden's announcement Kamala Harris would be his running mate.

== Filmography ==
=== Film ===
Year	Title	Role	Notes
2012	Adrift	Jess	Short film
2014	Hello, My Name Is Frank	Alisa	
2015	Insidious: Chapter 3	Maggie	
2015	Jem and the Holograms	Aja Leith	
2016	XOXO	Shannie	
2017	Becks	Lucy	
TBA	The Patience of Vultures	TBA	Pre-production

=== Television ===
Year	Title	Role	Notes
2007	Unfabulous	Auctioning Girl / Rapping & Dancing Girl	2 episodes
2009	Scooby-Doo! The Mystery Begins	Velma Dinkley	Television film
2010	Wizards of Waverly Place	Stevie Nichols	Recurring role; 4 episodes
2010	Scooby-Doo! Curse of the Lake Monster	Velma Dinkley	Television film
2011	Lemonade Mouth	Stella Yamada	Television film
2011	So Random!	Herself (as Lemonade Mouth)	Musical guest
2011	Zeke and Luther	Suzi Vandelintzer	Episode: "Skater Girl Island"
2012	Blue Lagoon: The Awakening	Helen	Television film
2013	The Vampire Diaries	Megan King	Episode: "I Know What You Did Last Summer"
2014	The Fosters	Gabi	Recurring role; 5 episodes
2015–2016	CSI: Cyber	Raven Ramirez	Main role
2017	Insecure	Miko	Episode: "Hella LA"
2018	Jimmy Kimmel Live!	Herself	Musical guest
2018–2019	Five Points	Lexi Himitsu	Main role
2020	RuPaul's Secret Celebrity Drag Race	Queen Eleza Beth	Episode: "Winner"
2022	Life by Ella	Herself, Gravel to Tempo	Episode: "Best Wishes"
2023	RuPaul's Drag Race	Herself	Episode: "Teacher Makeovers"
2023	Turning the Tables with Robin Roberts	Herself	Episode: "Certainty"

=== Web ===
Year	Title	Role	Notes
2014	The Fosters: Girls United	Gabi	Main role; 5 episodes
2018–2019	Five Points	Lexi Himitsu	Main role; 20 episodes

=== Voice work ===
Year	Title	Role	Notes	Ref.
2023	Girls Like Girls	Coley		

=== Self-directed music videos ===
Year	Title	Role
2015	Girls Like Girls	Director / Singer
2015	Cliff's Edge	Director / Singer / Actress
2016	Gravel to Tempo	Director / Singer / Actress
2016	One Bad Night	Director / Singer
2017	Sleepover	Director / Singer / Actress
2017	Feelings	Director / Singer / Actress
2018	Curious	Director / Singer / Actress
2018	What I Need	Director / Singer / Actress
2019	I Wish	Director / Singer / Actress
2021	Found My Friends	Director / Singer / Actress
2021	Chance	Director / Singer / Actress
2022	For the Girls	Director / Singer / Actress
2023	Hungry Heart	Director / Singer / Actress

=== As director ===
Year	Title	Notes
2026	Girls Like Girls	Also writer

== Discography ==
- Expectations (2018)
- Panorama (2022)

== Tours ==
=== Headlining ===
- This Side of Paradise Tour (2015)
- The Summer Tour (2015)
- One Bad Night Tour (2016–2017)
- Expectations Tour (2018–2019)
- Panorama Tour (2023)

=== Opening act ===
- Never Shout Never – Mid Winter's Nights Dream Acoustik Tour (2015)
- Miike Snow – III Tour (2016)
- Bridgit Mendler – Nemesis Tour (2016)
- Panic! at the Disco – Pray for the Wicked Tour (2018)
- Lauv – The All 4 Nothing Tour (2022)

=== Cancelled ===
- I'm Too Sensitive for This Shit Tour (2020)

== Awards and nominations ==
During her career, Kiyoko has been nominated for the following awards for her work as an actress, musical artist, and her presence in the LGBT community. In 2015, she won the Jury Award for her role as Alisa in Hello, My Name is Frank. In 2018, she won a MTV Video Music Award for Push Artist of the Year.

Year	Association	Category	Nominated work	Result	Ref.
2015	Independent Filmmakers Showcase Film Festival	Best Supporting Actress	Hello, My Name Is Frank...	Won	
2018	British LGBT Awards	Music Artist of the Year	Herself	Nominated	
2018	iHeartRadio Much Music Video Awards	Fan Fave New Artist	Herself	Nominated	
2018	MTV Video Music Awards	Best New Artist	Herself	Nominated	
2018	MTV Video Music Awards	Push Artist of the Year	Herself	Won	
2018	MTV Europe Music Awards	Best New Act	Herself	Nominated	
2018	MTV Europe Music Awards	Best Push Act	Herself	Nominated	
2018	Billboard Women in Music	Rising Star	Herself	Won	
2019	GLAAD Media Awards	Outstanding Music Artist	Expectations	Nominated	
2020	Spotify Awards	Most-Added to LGBTQ+ Playlists Artist	"Girls Like Girls"	Won	
2023	GLAAD Media Awards	Outstanding Music Artist	Panorama	Nominated	
2024	Golden Crown Literary Society	Young Adult Fiction	Girls Like Girls	Won	

== Bibliography ==
- Gravel to Tempo comic book (2018)
- Girls Like Girls (2023)
- Where There’s Room For Us (2025)

== See also ==
- Honorific nicknames in popular music
