= Feelings (Hayley Kiyoko song) =

Single by Hayley Kiyoko

from the album Expectations
- Released: October 19, 2017
- Genre: Pop; synth-pop
- Length: 3:37
- Label: Empire; Atlantic
- Songwriters: Hayley Kiyoko; Brandon Colbein; Jonathan Dorr; Kat Ostenberg; Nick Bailey
- Producers: Bailey; Dorr; Kiyoko

Hayley Kiyoko singles chronology
"Sleepover" (2017)	"Feelings" (2017)	"Curious" (2018)

Music video
- "Feelings" on YouTube

"Feelings" is a song recorded by American singer and actress Hayley Kiyoko for her debut studio album, Expectations (2018). The song was released with a music video as the second single from Expectations on October 19, 2017, although the album itself was not announced at the time of the single's release.

== Background ==
"Feelings" is written by Kiyoko, Brandon Colbein, Nick Bailey, Jonathan Dorr, Cecil Bernardy, and Katherine Ostenberg. Kiyoko has stated that she wanted fans to be reminded of the feeling of a first crush.

== Music video ==
A music video, directed by Kiyoko, was released concurrently with the single. As of January 2020, the video has garnered over 20 million views. The video stars Kiyoko chasing after a love interest, a girl named Desi, played by Alexandra Rodriguez. Reception to the video was positive, making it one of her most successful music videos at the time. Kiyoko aimed to show her playful side while acting in the video, and the video ended up being one of her favorite ones to make. The video was shot in one take.
