= Student Edge =

Australian student advocacy service

- Founded: 2003
- Founder: Craig Chetty, Damien Langley, Jeremy Chetty, Simon Loader
- Headquarters: Perth, Western Australia
- Members: 1,200,000 (2018)
- Employees: 23 (2018)
- Website: studentedge.org

Student Edge is an Australian student advocacy service, founded in 2003 in Perth, Western Australia, by university students. The organisation currently has approximately 1,100,000 members.

== History ==
=== Founding ===
Student Edge claims to offer Australians participating in secondary, tertiary education and apprenticeships/traineeships to register for Student Edge membership and take advantage of discounts, free job and internship search boards, career tips and well-being services. While it began with a $20 subscription cost as its initial business model, the model was upturned in 2006/2007, making the membership, as well as access to its exclusive deals and competitions, free. The company now relies on advertising and sponsorship for its revenue. Following this move, its membership flourished with major brands such as Apple, McDonald's, Boost Juice and Bankwest - along with numerous Government agencies - coming on board to sponsor the company. The rise in popularity led to the company's national launch in August 2010.

=== National launch ===
On 27 August 2010, following a celebration at the State library of Western Australia, the company opened its membership to students across Australia. This roll-out increased the number of affiliated major brands, as well as the overall membership offering. By the end of 2011, Student Edge had 500,000 cardholders, making it the largest student member benefits organisation in the country and as of 2018, the company has more than 1,000,000 members nationwide.

=== Collaborations with schools ===
Student Edge's outreach team makes more than 100 visits to schools per year, educating students on social media responsibility and offering career tips. In 2014, Student Edge launched their annual Teacher of the Year competition, awarding NSW's Sefton High School history teacher Thomas Elley the inaugural prize.

=== YouthInsight ===
On 23 May, Student Edge's full-service market research arm YouthInsight unveiled Australia's inaugural Top 100 Youth Brands report at the Youth Marketing Australia conference in Melbourne. Based on a survey of more than 2,000 young people, YouTube was named the #1 brand among Australian youths. YouTube was also #1 in the Social Media and Apps category. Other category winners included Netflix (Entertainment), Google (Digital and Technology), Commonwealth Bank (Finance), McDonald's (Fast Food & Restaurants), Dove (toiletries) (Health & Beauty) and Woolworths (Retail & Online Retail).
