= This Side of Paradise (EP) =

EP by Hayley Kiyoko
- Released: February 3, 2015
- Genre: Pop
- Length: 18:16
- Label: Self-released; Steel Wool
- Producer: James Flannigan

Hayley Kiyoko chronology
A Belle to Remember (2013)	This Side of Paradise (2015)	Citrine (2016)

Singles from This Side of Paradise
- 1. "This Side of Paradise" Released: September 29, 2014; 2. "Girls Like Girls" Released: June 24, 2015; 3. "Cliff's Edge" Released: November 4, 2015

This Side of Paradise is the second extended play (EP) by American singer and actress Hayley Kiyoko, co-released by herself and Steel Wool Records on February 3, 2015. The entire album was written and recorded by Kiyoko along with producer and multi-instrumentalist James Flannigan and is described as a pop record. The EP was preceded by the release of the single "This Side of Paradise" on September 29, 2014.

== Composition ==
Each song on the EP is "'80s pop and inject[ed] with modern flavor." The total duration of the album is 18 minutes and 16 seconds. During an interview to Billboard, Kiyoko said: "I think every track of the EP is really a piece of me, of what I have felt growing up, from a child to a young adult," and also "The outcome of this EP is worth so much more to me because it was really built from the ground up."

== Singles ==
"This Side of Paradise" was released on September 29, 2014 as the EP's lead single. Its music video was released on November 12, 2014 and was directed by RJ Sanchez. "Girls Like Girls" was released with a music video as the second single on June 24, 2015, directed by Kiyoko and Austin S. Winchell. Currently, the video already has more than 100 million views. The EP's third and final single, "Cliff's Edge", was released on November 4, 2015 alongside a music video.

== Track listing ==
No.	Title	Writer(s)	Length
1.	"Given It All"	Hayley Kiyoko; James Flannigan; Sergei Ramos	3:50
2.	"Cliffs Edge"	Kiyoko; Jacques Brautbar	3:33
3.	"This Side of Paradise"	Kiyoko; Ramos	3:32
4.	"Girls Like Girls"	Kiyoko; Owen Thomas; Lily-May Young	3:49
5.	"Feeding the Fire"	Kiyoko; Flannigan; Grahn	3:30
Total length:			18:16
