= Girls Like Girls =

2015 single by Hayley Kiyoko

- Remixes single cover

Single by Hayley Kiyoko

from the album This Side of Paradise
- Released: June 24, 2015
- Genre: Electropop; synth-pop
- Length: 3:49
- Label: Self-released; Steel Wool
- Songwriters: Hayley Kiyoko; Owen Thomas; Lily-May Young
- Producer: James Flannigan

Hayley Kiyoko singles chronology
"This Side of Paradise" (2014)	"Girls Like Girls" (2015)	"Cliff's Edge" (2015)

Music video
- "Girls Like Girls" on YouTube

"Girls Like Girls" is a song recorded by American singer and actress Hayley Kiyoko for her second extended play This Side of Paradise. The song was released with a music video as the second single on June 24, 2015, directed by Kiyoko and Austin S. Winchel.

A new version of the song by Kiyoko was released on June 12, 2026, and was featured on the film of the same name.

== Composition ==
"Girls Like Girls" is written by Kiyoko along with Owen Thomas and Lily-May Young; with production handled by James Flannigan. The concept of the song is based around writing about subjects that may not be in the spotlight. In an interview with Us Weekly, Kiyoko stated: "I loved the idea of how all these guys always are stealing other guys’ girls and I was like, ‘There’s no female anthem for a girl stealing another guy's girl,' and that is the coolest thing ever, ['Girls Like Girls' has] become a universal video that brings out different kinds of emotions for different kinds of people."

== Music video ==
A music video, directed by both Kiyoko and Austin S. Winchell was released in August. It stars her Jem and the Holograms costar Stefanie Scott in the main role of Coley as the love interest of Sonya (played by Kelsey Chow). The music video itself caused a big impact on microblogging website Tumblr and eventually went viral, reaching more than 160 million views.

=== Synopsis ===
The music video follows Coley and Sonya as they realize their love for each other extends beyond friendship. The video opens with Coley looking sad as she rides a bike through a suburban neighborhood with cuts on her face. Coley gets the cuts after Sonya's boyfriend catches them almost kissing by the pool and physically assaults her in a fit of rage. Before the altercation takes place, Coley and Sonya hang out as friends. They smoke together at Sonya's house and Coley watches adoringly as Sonya dances freely in an outdoor open space. They exchange knowing looks and long stares as they change into swimsuits before the pool party. Another day, as Sonya is sitting by the pool, Coley approaches her and sits by her. They try to kiss, but Sonya's boyfriend assaults them. After Coley is hit by Sonya’s boyfriend, she jumps on him as he yells at Sonya and continues punching him until Sonya manages to tear her off of him. The two finally kiss, and the video concludes with Coley riding happily on her bike in the same suburban neighborhood from the first scene.

== Critical reception ==
In 2019, Billboard included the song in its list of the "30 Lesbian Love Songs".

== Adaptations ==
In 2023, Kiyoko released a young adult novel based on the song and music video that functions as a continuation of the storyline. The coming-of-age story follows a 17-year-old Coley, as she struggles with the death of her mother and the difficult relationship with her father, while she also begins questioning her friendship with her classmate Sonya.

A feature film adaptation was first reported by Deadline on December 4, 2024, to be in development with Kiyoko taken directorial duties in her directorial debut. The worldwide rights were acquired by Focus Features, it is being produced by Marc Platt Productions and BuzzFeed Studios. The script is being written by Kiyoko and Stefanie Scott. In an interview with People, Kiyoko stated that development for the project started around a year after the release of the music video and stated that the song Greenlight, which she wrote in 2023, was written as expression of her frustrations in getting her film greenlit. On the 10-year anniversary of the song, Kiyoko announced that Maya da Costa and Myra Molloy were cast as Coley and Sonya respectively. The film was released on June 19, 2026.

== Track listings ==
- Digital download (remixes)
1. "Girls Like Girls" (Jenaux remix) – 3:53
2. "Girls Like Girls" (Oski remix) – 3:44
3. "Girls Like Girls" (Kuga remix) – 2:56
4. "Girls Like Girls" (Vali remix) – 3:45

== Certifications ==
Region	Certification	Certified units/sales
United States (RIAA)	Gold	500,000^{‡}
^{‡} Sales+streaming figures based on certification alone.
