= What I Need (Hayley Kiyoko song) =

2018 single by Hayley Kiyoko

Single by Hayley Kiyoko featuring Kehlani

from the album Expectations
- Released: May 31, 2018
- Genre: Pop rock
- Length: 3:40
- Label: Empire; Atlantic
- Songwriters: Hayley Kiyoko; Brandon Colbein; Nick Bailey; Jonathan Dorr; Kehlani Parrish
- Producers: Hayley Kiyoko; Jonathan Dorr

Hayley Kiyoko singles chronology
"Curious" (2018)	"What I Need" (2018)	"Headcase" (2019)

Kehlani singles chronology
"Playinwitme" (2018)	"What I Need" (2018)	"Ring" (2018)

Music video
- "What I Need" on YouTube

"What I Need" is a song by American singer and actress Hayley Kiyoko featuring American singer-songwriter Kehlani. It was released as a single on May 31, 2018, along with an accompanying music video.

== Music video ==
A music video, directed by Kiyoko, was released concurrently with the single. As of June 2024, the video has garnered over 50 million views.
