= Expectations (Hayley Kiyoko album) =

Studio album by Hayley Kiyoko
- Released: March 30, 2018
- Recorded: 2017
- Genre: Electropop
- Length: 48:37
- Labels: Empire; Atlantic
- Producers: Hayley Kiyoko (also exec.); Jono Dorr (also exec.); Ceclil Bernardy; Nick Bailey; Jack & Coke; Jonas Jeberg; The Futuristics; Grizzly

Hayley Kiyoko chronology
| Citrine (2016) | Expectations (2018) | I'm Too Sensitive for This Shit (2020) |

Singles from Expectations
- 1. "Sleepover" Released: March 3, 2017; 2. "Feelings" Released: October 19, 2017; 3. "Curious" Released: January 11, 2018; 4. "What I Need" Released: May 31, 2018

Expectations is the debut major label studio album by American singer and actress Hayley Kiyoko, released on March 30, 2018. The album title was announced along with its cover on January 1, 2018, through social media. The album was preceded by the singles "Sleepover", "Feelings" and "Curious". Expectations garnered mostly positive reviews from music critics. The album debuted within the top 40 of record charts in Ireland, New Zealand, United Kingdom and United States.

== Singles ==
Expectations was preceded by the release of three singles, as well as one promotional single. The first single called "Sleepover" was released on March 2, 2017, along its music video, directed by Kiyoko herself, via BuzzFeed. The second single, "Feelings" was released on October 19, 2017, along its self-directed music video. "Curious" was released as the third single on January 11, 2018, with the pre-order of the album and, as the previous singles, along its music video, directed by Kiyoko herself and James Larese. It premiered via Total Request Live. "Curious" additionally became Kiyoko's first single to chart, peaking at no. 40 on the US Mainstream Top 40 and no. 37 on the US Dance/Mix Show Airplay chart. "Let It Be" was released as a promotional single on March 16, 2018.

== Critical reception ==
Professional ratings
Aggregate scores
| Source | Rating |
|---|---|
| Metacritic | 68/100 |
Review scores
| Source | Rating |
| The 405 | 8/10 |
| AllMusic | 3/5 stars |
| The Guardian | 4/5 stars |
| MTV | Positive |
| Newsday.com | Positive |
| Pitchfork | 6.0/10 |

Expectations received generally positive reviews from music critics. Laura Snapes, writing for Pitchfork, gave the album a 6 out of 10 rating. She defines the album's best moments as those "trading in specificity rather than generic neediness, representing an experience that rarely finds an outlet in pop." She also, however, criticized the songwriting on the album, stating "it lacks that kind of songwriting consistency." Snapes concludes her review by writing, "Kiyoko’s debut won’t blow past anyone’s expectations, but it contains just enough intrigue and individuality to sustain them for a second shot." Neil Z. Yeung of AllMusic wrote, "sometimes, Expectations can be generic, like on "Sleepover" and "He'll Never Love You," [...] However, despite this occasional dip into indistinguishable pop territory, Kiyoko's debut hints at untapped potential from a fresh voice with a relatable perspective." Emily Mackay of The Guardian reacted more positively, calling the album "sparklingly refreshing" and felt the album's ability to "[stay] true to idiosyncratic instinct has made Expectations feel more universal than a generic, play-it-safe debut." Mackay rated the album four stars out of five.

Lauren Mullineaux, writing for The 405, rated the album 8 out of 10, praising the album's LGBT themes. She noted Kiyoko as "the first unabashedly queer female normalising this in the mainstream on such a transparent, visible level; through her lyrics and her videos." Mullineaux was also complimentary towards the album's "polished" production, as well as listing "Mercy/Gatekeeper", "Molecules", and "He'll Never Love You (HNLY)" as album highlights. Sydney Gore of MTV described the album as "a full range of life experiences covered within these 13 tracks, marking the first chapter of an ongoing story that Hayley finally feels comfortable in sharing with the world." Glenn Gamboa of Newsday.com praised the album, writing that "For Kiyoko, “Expectations” couldn't be higher, but the music is so good she seems set to surpass even the loftiest ones."

== Track listing ==
Expectations track listing
| No. | Title | Writer(s) | Producer(s) | Length |
|---|---|---|---|---|
| 1. | "Expectations (Overture)" | Hayley Kiyoko; Cecil Bernardy; Jono Dorr; Liv Marisco; Nicole Morier | Kiyoko; Bernardy; Dorr | 1:52 |
| 2. | "Feelings" | Kiyoko; Nick Bailey; Dorr; Kat Ostenberg; Brandon Skeie | Kiyoko; Bernardy; Dorr | 3:36 |
| 3. | "What I Need" (featuring Kehlani) | Kiyoko; Dorr; Kehlani Parrish; Skeie | Dorr | 3:39 |
| 4. | "Sleepover" | Kiyoko; Cecil Bernardy; Dorr; Nikki Flores | Bernardy; Dorr | 3:53 |
| 5. | "Mercy / Gatekeeper" | Kiyoko; Bernardy; Dorr; Flores | Kiyoko; Bernardy; Dorr | 5:44 |
| 6. | "Under the Blue / Take Me In" | Kiyoko; Bernardy; Dorr; Morier | Kiyoko; Bernardy; Dorr | 5:37 |
| 7. | "Curious" | Kiyoko; Svante Halldin; Jakob Hazell; Skeie; Lisa Vitale | Kiyoko; Jack & Coke; Dorr^{[a]} | 3:03 |
| 8. | "xx" | Dorr | Kiyoko; Dorr | 0:51 |
| 9. | "Wanna Be Missed" | Kiyoko; Jonas Jeberg; Joe Khajadourian; Madison Love; Alex Schwartz | Kiyoko; The Futuristics; Jeberg; Dorr^{[a]} | 3:15 |
| 10. | "He'll Never Love You (HNLY)" | Kiyoko; Bernardy; Dorr; Cara Salimando | Kiyoko; Dorr | 3:51 |
| 11. | "Palm Dreams" | Kiyoko; Fredrik Berger; Gustav Jonsson; Skeie | Kiyoko; Grizzly | 5:14 |
| 12. | "Molecules" | Kiyoko; Bernardy; Dorr; Morier | Kiyoko; Bernardy; Dorr | 4:10 |
| 13. | "Let It Be" | Kiyoko; Bernardy; Dorr | Kiyoko; Bernardy; Dorr | 3:41 |
| Total length: | | | | 48:37 |

== Personnel ==
Musicians

- Hayley Kiyoko – lead vocals (all tracks), programming (tracks 1, 2, 5, 6, 10, 12, 13)
- Jono Dorr – programming (tracks 1–10, 12, 13); background vocals, bass guitar, drum programming, guitar (3); additional keyboards (7)
- Cecil Bernardy – programming (tracks 1, 2, 4–7, 10, 12, 13), additional keyboards (7)
- Jack & Coke – drums, keyboards, programming (track 7)
- Jonas Jeberg – programming (track 9)
- The Futuristics – programming (track 9)
- Lawrence William IV – background vocals (track 11)
- Brandon Skeie – background vocals (track 11)
- Grizzly – programming (track 11)
- Allie Gonino – violin (track 12)

Technical

- Adam Hawkins – mixing
- Joe LaPorta – mastering (tracks 1, 3, 5, 6, 8–13)
- Dave Kutch – mastering (tracks 2, 7)
- Tom Coyne – mastering (track 4)
- Jacob Munk – mixing assistance

== Charts ==
| Chart (2018) | Peak position |
|---|---|
| Australian Albums (ARIA) | 20 |
| Austrian Albums (Ö3 Austria) | 47 |
| Belgian Albums (Ultratop Flanders) | 46 |
| Belgian Albums (Ultratop Wallonia) | 121 |
| Canadian Albums (Billboard) | 16 |
| Dutch Albums (Album Top 100) | 44 |
| German Albums (Offizielle Top 100) | 93 |
| Irish Albums (IRMA) | 23 |
| New Zealand Albums (RMNZ) | 25 |
| Scottish Albums (Official Charts) | 21 |
| Swiss Albums (Schweizer Hitparade) | 56 |
| UK Albums (Official Charts) | 24 |
| US Billboard 200 | 12 |
