= Marie-Mai discography =

- Studio albums: 7
- Extended plays: 1
- Singles: 9
- Video albums: 2
- Music videos: 25

The discography of Marie-Mai, a Canadian singer, contains seven studio albums, one extended play, nine singles and two video albums.

== Albums ==
=== Studio albums ===
Year	Album details	Peak chart positions		Certifications (sales thresholds)
Year	Album details	CAN	FRA	Certifications (sales thresholds)
2004	Inoxydable: Released: September 28, 2004; Label: Musicor; Format: CD	—	137	CAN: Gold
2007	Dangereuse Attraction: Released: August 28, 2007; Label: Musicor; Format: CD	2	—	CAN: Gold
2009	Version 3.0: Released: September 22, 2009; Label: Musicor; Format: CD	3	—	CAN: Platinum
2012	Miroir: Released: September 17, 2012; Label: Musicor; Format: CD	2	—	CAN: Platinum
2014	M: Released: May 12, 2014; Label: Musicor; Format: CD	2	—	CAN: Gold
2018	Elle et moi: Released: November 9, 2018; Label: Spectra Musique; Format: CD	15	—	—
2024	Sept: Released: October 18, 2024; Label: Spectra Musique; Format: CD	—	—	—
"—" denotes the album failed to chart or was not released

=== Extended plays ===
Year	Album details
2011	For the First Time - EP: Released: October 4, 2011; Label: Musicor; Format: Digital download

== Singles ==
Year	Single	Chart positions		Album
Year	Single	CAN	FRA	Album
2005	"Il faut que tu t'en ailles "	-	66	Inoxydable
2007	"Qui Prendra Ma Place"	66	-	Dangereuse Attraction
2007	"Mentir"	86	-	Dangereuse Attraction
2009	"C'est moi"	83	-	Version 3.0
2011	"Comme avant"	68	-	Version 3.0
2012	"Sans Cri Ni Haine"	67	-	Miroir
2012	"C.O.B.R.A."	74	-	Miroir
2012	"Là-bas" (with Baptiste Giabiconi)	-	96	Génération Goldman
2014	"Jamais trop tard" (with Jonas)	54	-	M
2019	"The Good Ones" (with Tebey)	(Note: "The Good Ones" did not enter the Canadian Hot 100, but has peaked at number 14 on the Canadian Digital Song Sales component chart.)	-	The Good Ones

=== As featured artist ===
Year	Single	Chart positions		Album
Year	Single	CAN	FRA	Album
2010	"Je repars" (David Usher featuring Marie-Mai)	-	-	The Mile End Sessions
2011	"Jet Lag" (Simple Plan featuring Marie-Mai)	-	11	Get Your Heart On!
2020	"Sans Lendemain (One Last Time)" (Imposs featuring Marie-Mai)	-	-	TBA

== Video albums ==
Year	Album details	Certifications (sales thresholds)
2006	La Tournée Inoxydable: Released: December 5, 2006; Label: J Productions	
2014	Live Au Centre Bell - Traverser Le Miroir: Label: J Productions	CAN: Platinum (4)

== Music videos ==
Song	Album
"Il faut que tu t'en ailles"	Inoxydable
"Tu t'en fous"	Inoxydable
"Encore une nuit"	Inoxydable
"Rien"	Inoxydable
"Mentir"	Dangereuse Attraction
"Emmène-Moi"	Dangereuse Attraction
"Qui prendra ma place"	Dangereuse Attraction
"Deja Loin"	Version 3.0
"J'attendrai mon tour"	Version 3.0
"C'est moi"	Version 3.0
"Comme avant"	Version 3.0
"Comme avant" (Webclip)	Version 3.0
"C.O.B.R.A."	Miroir
"Je cours"	Miroir
"Différents"	Miroir
"Jamais trop tard"	M
"Conscience"	M
"Tourner"	M
"Indivisible"	M
"Almost"	Non-album single
"Je reviens"	Non-album single
"Empire"	Elle et moi
"Je décolle"	Elle et moi
"Exister"	Elle et moi
"Pour toi"	Non-album single
"Combien de temps"	Sept
