= Moist (band) =

Canadian rock band

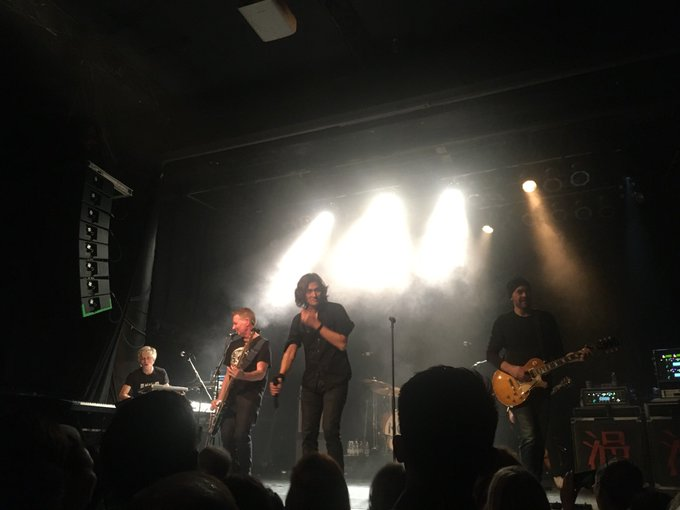
- Moist performing in 2019

Background information
- Origin: Vancouver, Canada
- Genres: Alternative rock, power pop, grunge
- Years active: 1992–2001, 2013–present
- Labels: EMI (1994–2001); Universal (2014); Known Accomplice (2021–present)
- Members: David Usher; Mark Makoway; Kevin Young; Jeff Pearce; Francis Fillion; Jonathan Gallivan
- Past members: Jamie Kaufmann; Paul Wilcox; Louis Lalancette; Chris Taylor-Munro
- Website: moistonline.com

Moist is a Canadian rock band that formed in 1992. It consists of David Usher as lead vocalist, Mark Makoway on lead guitars, Jonathan Gallivan on guitars, Kevin Young on keyboards, Francis Fillion on drums, and Jeff Pearce on bass. Drummer Paul Wilcox left the band just before its hiatus in 2000.

Moist was signed by EMI Music in 1994 and released three studio albums in the 1990s, becoming a staple of Canadian rock music. Shortly after releasing a compilation album in 2001, the band underwent an unplanned hiatus for over a decade, and then became officially re-established in June 2013. Shortly after reuniting, the band began work on their fourth studio album, entitled Glory Under Dangerous Skies, which was released in 2014. Their fifth album, End of the Ocean, was released in January 2022.

The band has been nominated for ten Juno Awards, winning two. Between 1996 and 2016, Moist was among the top 50 best-selling Canadian artists in Canada and among the top 20 best-selling Canadian bands in Canada.

== History ==
=== Founding and mainstream success (1992–2001) ===
Mark Makoway, Jeff Pearce, David Usher and Kevin Young, all from Ontario, all individually moved to Vancouver over eight years. The group came together in 1992 where they formed the first version of Moist, which included drummer Jamie Kaufmann. The band began writing songs in November 1992 and played their first gig two months later. Drummer Paul Wilcox replaced Kaufmann in early 1993.

In 1993, the band recorded a 9-song demo tape at the 8th Avenue Sound Studio with engineer Kevin Hamilton. Their sound was influenced by contemporary Seattle acts such as Soundgarden, Pearl Jam, Nirvana, and Alice in Chains. The two-day recording session cost $500 Canadian dollars. The band had 500 copies of this untitled cassette manufactured. The band found support from the staff at the flagship Sam the Record Man store in Vancouver. The cassette reached No. 1 on Sam the Record Man's local independent chart. The release was distributed to other stores in the national chain and entered the top 10 on Sam the Record Man's national independent chart. In October 1993, Moist signed to EMI Music Publishing Canada. Moist spent much of 1993 touring Canada and writing material for an expanded release.

In January 1994, they completed their first full-length album, which cost $3,000 Canadian dollars. The album was titled Silver and released independently on February 8, 1994. After MuchMusic began playing the music video for Moist's lead single "Push" in medium rotation, the album sold almost 6,000 records within six weeks. By March 1994, the band signed with EMI Music Canada. The Silver album went on to sell 400,000 copies in Canada on the strength of the singles "Push", "Silver", "Believe Me", and "Machine Punch Through". The band was also successful internationally in the United Kingdom, Germany, and Thailand. That year the band continued to tour around Canada. In 1995, the band won the Juno Award for "Best New Group". That same year, the band also played the Molson Ice Polar Beach Party, a private concert in Tuktoyaktuk, Northwest Territories. Metallica headlined the concert with Hole and Veruca Salt also appearing.

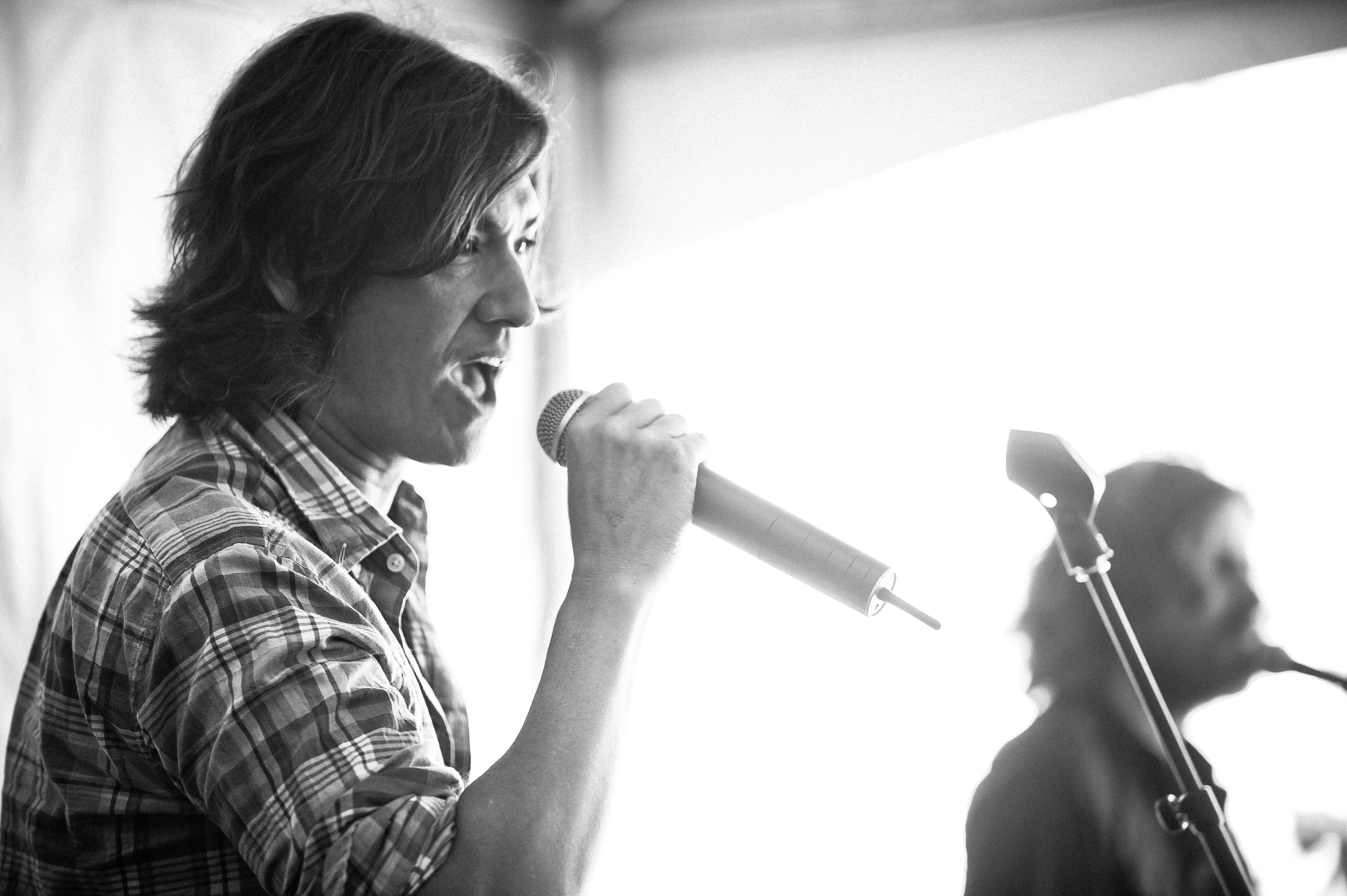
Frontman David Usher performing in 2012

In late 1996, Moist released their second album, Creature, to favourable reviews and sales in excess of 300,000 units. The album included the hits "Leave It Alone", "Resurrection", "Tangerine", and "Gasoline", all of which were placed on high rotation on MuchMusic. In addition to these, a remixed version of "Tangerine" became a hit on radio and MuchMusic.

Following the band's second record, David Usher released his first solo album, Little Songs.

In early 1999, the band regrouped to record their third full-length album, the melancholic and soft-toned Mercedes 5 and Dime. The album was released in the summer of 1999 in Canada and later in 2000 in the United States. Singles included "Breathe", "Underground", and "Comes and Goes". While touring in support of the album, drummer Paul Wilcox injured his back, causing him to miss the band's final performances. In December 2000, it was revealed that Wilcox had decided to take a "potential permanent leave from the band." Wilcox never returned to the band and retired from music. The band released a compilation album and DVD in 2001, titled Machine Punch Through. Moist did not perform at all in 2001. Though David Usher stated that Moist was still together as late as 2002, the band's hiatus would last 12 years.

=== Hiatus (2001–2013) ===
During the band's hiatus, David Usher continued to record solo, releasing Morning Orbit in 2001, Hallucinations in 2003, If God Had Curves in 2005, Strange Birds in 2007, Wake Up and Say Goodbye in 2008, The Mile End Sessions in 2010, and Songs from the Last Day on Earth in 2012. Mark Makoway published a guide to the music industry, called The Indie Band Bible, and continued to produce and mix records. Jeff Pearce formed the band RYE, and released the album "Wolves" through Maple Nationwide in 2004. Kevin Young toured with David and worked as a freelance writer.

=== Reunion, new albums (2013–present) ===
In June 2013, the band got back together, with Francis Fillion on drums. The first new Moist recording in 13 years, a cover of Greg Lake's "I Believe in Father Christmas", was released through CBC Music in December 2013. Moist toured around Canada in November and December that year, calling their tour "Moist - The Resurrection", a reference to their 1996 single "Resurrection". The tour began in London, Ontario and ended in Calgary, Alberta.

In January 2014, the band, now including Jonathan Gallivan, who had accompanied Moist as a second guitarist on the 2013 tour, reconvened in Montréal to continue work on material for a new album. Although he would still be featured on some of the new record, bassist Jeff Pearce left to focus on being a father. Recording of the new songs began in January 2014. The band signed a new deal with Universal Music Canada, and released a single, "Mechanical", to radio on May 23, 2014, and to iTunes on May 27. The band's fourth full-length album, Glory Under Dangerous Skies, was released on October 7, 2014.

On May 9, 2019, it was announced that Jeff Pearce had reunited with the band. 2019 also marked the 25th anniversary of Moist's debut hit album Silver. Moist took to the road for the Silver 25th Anniversary Tour through Canada. The group performed Silver in its entirety, as well as favourites from their career. In November 2019, Moist released a 2CD/digital remastered edition of Silver and a 180g 3LP deluxe edition out in December. Both versions include demos, acoustic versions, and previously unreleased live tracks recorded in Los Angeles in 1994.

Also in November 2019, Moist released remasters of their albums, Silver, Creature, and Mercedes Five and Dime, for the first time on 180g vinyl.

In January 2021, Moist released a single "Tarantino", their first new song since 2014. In April 2021, Moist announced that they would be releasing a new studio album, End of the Ocean, on October 1, 2021. The title track single of the same name was simultaneously released. The album was released on January 14, 2022.

== Band members ==
=== Current ===
- David Usher – lead vocals (1992–2001, 2013–present)
- Mark Makoway – guitars (1992–2001, 2013–present)
- Kevin Young – keyboards, backing vocals (1992–2001, 2013–present)
- Jeff Pearce – bass, mandolin, backing vocals (1992–2001, 2013–2014, 2019–present)
- Francis Fillion – drums (2013–present)
- Jonathan Gallivan – guitars, backing vocals (2014–present)

=== Past ===
- Jamie Kaufmann – drums (1992–1993)
- Paul Wilcox – drums (1993–2000)
- Chris Taylor-Munro – drums (2000–2001)
- Louis Lalancette – bass (2014–2018)

== Discography ==
=== Studio albums ===
| Year | Title | Peak chart positions | Certifications |
| Year | Title | CAN | CAN |
|---|---|---|---|
| 1994 | Silver | 11 | 4× Platinum |
| 1996 | Creature | 7 | 3× Platinum |
| 1999 | Mercedes 5 and Dime | 4 | Platinum |
| 2014 | Glory Under Dangerous Skies | 8 | |
| 2022 | End of the Ocean | | |

=== Independent albums ===
| Year | Title | Chart positions | Certifications |
| Year | Title | CAN | CAN |
|---|---|---|---|
| 1993 | Moist (independent cassette) | - | |

=== Compilations ===
| Year | Title | Peak chart positions | Certifications |
| Year | Title | CAN | CAN |
|---|---|---|---|
| 2001 | Machine Punch Through: The Singles Collection | 58 | |

=== Singles ===
| Year | Song | Peak chart positions | | | | | Album |
| Year | Song | US Main | CAN | CAN Rock/Alt. | CAN CanCon | CAN AC | Album |
|---|---|---|---|---|---|---|---|
| 1994 | "Push" | 37 | 32 | — | — | — | Silver |
| 1994 | "Silver" | — | 9 | — | — | — | Silver |
| 1994 | "Believe Me" | — | 11 | — | 8 | — | Silver |
| 1995 | "Machine Punch Through" | — | 72 | — | 5 | — | Silver |
| 1995 | "Freaky Be Beautiful" | — | — | — | — | — | Silver |
| 1996 | "Leave it Alone" | — | 3 | 6 | — | — | Creature |
| 1996 | "Resurrection" | — | 8 | 4 | — | — | Creature |
| 1997 | "Tangerine" | — | 25 | — | — | — | Creature |
| 1997 | "Gasoline" | — | 27 | 51 | — | — | Creature |
| 1999 | "Breathe" | — | 28 | 5 | — | 22 | Mercedes 5 and Dime |
| 1999 | "Underground" | — | 36 | 7 | — | — | Mercedes 5 and Dime |
| 2000 | "Comes and Goes" | — | — | 10 | — | — | Mercedes 5 and Dime |
| 2000 | "Dogs" | — | — | — | — | — | Mercedes 5 and Dime |
| 2014 | "Mechanical" | – | – | 3 | — | — | Glory Under Dangerous Skies |
| 2014 | "Black Roses" | — | — | 9 | — | — | Glory Under Dangerous Skies |
| 2021 | "Tarantino" | – | – | – | — | — | End of the Ocean |
| 2021 | "End of the Ocean" | — | — | – | — | — | End of the Ocean |
| 2021 | "Dying For a Light In The Dark (We Are)" | — | — | – | — | — | End of the Ocean |
"—" denotes releases that did not chart or were not released in that country.

- Note: The RPM Rock/Alternative chart was not created until June 1995, hence no ranking for Silver singles.

=== Music videos ===
| Year | Video | Director(s) |
|---|---|---|
| 1994 | "Push" | Brenton Spencer |
| 1994 | "Silver" | |
| 1994 | "Believe Me" | |
| 1994 | "Freaky Be Beautiful" | |
| 1996 | "Leave it Alone" | |
| 1996 | "Resurrection" | |
| 1997 | "Tangerine" | Stephen Scott |
| 1997 | "Gasoline" | Javier Aquilera |
| 1999 | "Breathe" | Phil Harder |
| 2000 | "Underground" | Ulf Buddensieck |
| 2021 | "End of the Ocean" | Mateo Guez |

== Awards and recognition ==
- Won Juno for Best New Group at the 1995 Juno Awards.
- Won Juno for best video (Gasoline) at the 1997 Juno Awards.
- Won "Q107 Canada's Rock Award" for best album (Silver) in 1995.
- Won "Q107 Canada's Rock Award" for best group in 1995.
- David Usher won "Q107 Canada's Rock Award" for best singer in 1995.
- Kevin Young won "Q107 Canada's Rock Award" for best keyboard player in 1995.
- Won an MMVA (MuchMusic Video Award) for Favorite Canadian Group in 1995.
- The video for the song Tangerine won Best Video, and Best Director at the (MuchMusic Video Awards) in 1997.
- Jon Benedictson Drummer from 1990 - 1993*
