= Let It Play =

2016 studio album by David Usher

Studio album by David Usher
- Released: October 21, 2016
- Genre: Pop
- Label: Evil Empire Inc.

David Usher chronology
Songs from the Last Day on Earth (2012)	Let It Play (2016)

Let It Play is the ninth studio album by Canadian musical artist David Usher. It was released on October 21, 2016, via David Usher's own music label, Evil Empire Inc. The album features English translations of French-Canadian songs, re-recorded originals from Usher's repertoire, as well as high-profile collaborations with artists such as Marie-Mai, Alex Nevsky, Monogrenade, Karim Ouellet, Dumas, Ingrid St-Pierre, Caracol, Daniel Lavoie, Dominique A, and Baden Baden.

== Track listing ==
1. "They Will Believe (In This Love)" with Alex Nevsky
2. "We Will Be Free" with Monogrenade
3. "Let It Play" with Dumas
4. "No Cure" with Ingrid St-Pierre
5. "Black Black Heart" with Marie-Mai
6. "Dream of Flight" with Baden Baden
7. "War Again" with Karim Ouellet
8. "Who Knows" from Daniel Lavoie's Qui Sait
9. "Nothing to Lose" with Baden Baden & Ingrid St-Pierre
10. "Asleep Underwater" with Caracol
11. "Till the Night Is Gone" with Monogrenade
