= Machine Punch Through: The Singles Collection =

Greatest hits album by Moist
- Released: November 13, 2001
- Recorded: at Metalworks Studios in Mississauga, Ontario
- Genre: Alternative rock

Moist chronology
Mercedes 5 and Dime (1999)	Machine Punch Through: The Singles Collection (2001)	Glory Under Dangerous Skies (2014)

Machine Punch Through: The Singles Collection is an album by the Canadian alternative rock band Moist, released in 2001. The album featured one new song, "Sunday Comes," previously issued on the "Breathe" remix single. The remainder of the album was a compilation of previous singles. The album would be the band's last before their unplanned 12-year hiatus, and the last to feature band members Paul Wilcox.

Early copies of the album were also released with a second six-song bonus disc, compiling songs that the band had released on movie soundtracks or as fan club singles. There are also DVD video and DVD audio versions of this collection, the former containing all of the band's music videos and tour footage, the latter containing the audio CD in enhanced resolution.

== Reception ==
Mike Devlin from the Times Colonist gave it a rating of. He said the "whopping 11 rare or un-released cuts, six compiled on the bonus second disc, make this essential for both fans and completists". He also noted that because many of the songs are known to "radio listeners", the album "does get a bit tedious".

Gerry Krochak from the Regina Leader-Post was not that enthusiastic about the album saying, "one would suppose that if you don't own a Moist album, and you need to own a Moist album, then Machine Punch Through might as well be the one". The Harbour City Star only rated it, saying it was a "banal collection of songs" ... and the album "has little to offer".

== Track listing ==
All songs written by Moist.

=== Audio CD ===
1. "Resurrection" — 3:59
2. "Underground (Radio Mix)" — 4:12
3. "Silver" — 4:17
4. "Breathe" — 4:54
5. "Tangerine" — 4:05
6. "Leave It Alone" — 4:27
7. "Comes And Goes (Modern Rock Mix)" — 3:47
8. "Push" — 3:53
9. "Gasoline (Radio Mix)" — 3:35
10. "See Touch Feel" — 3:24
11. "Believe Me" — 3:54
12. "Dogs" — 4:34
13. "Machine Punch Through" — 4:28
14. "Sunday Comes" — 4:18

=== Bonus Disc ===
1. "Sweet Electric Child" — 3:28
2. "Day" — 2:59
3. "Claus" — 3:18
4. "Gone Again" — 4:42
5. "Morphine" — 5:38
6. "You Remind Me" — 3:32

=== DVD ===
1. "Underground"
2. "Silver"
3. "Resurrection"
4. "Leave It Alone"
5. "Freaky Be Beautiful"
6. "Gasoline"
7. "Believe Me"
8. "Tangerine"
9. "Breathe"
10. "Push"
11. "Resurrection (Live)"
12. "Tangerine (remix)"

=== Special features ===
- Commentary
- Live footage and tour video
- Short film bio
- Discography
- Biography
- Web links
- Hidden features & surprises
- Audio only option

== Personnel ==
- David Usher - vocals
- Jeff Pearce - bass
- Mark Makoway - guitar
- Kevin Young - keyboard/piano
- Paul Wilcox - drums
