= Jonathan Gallivan =

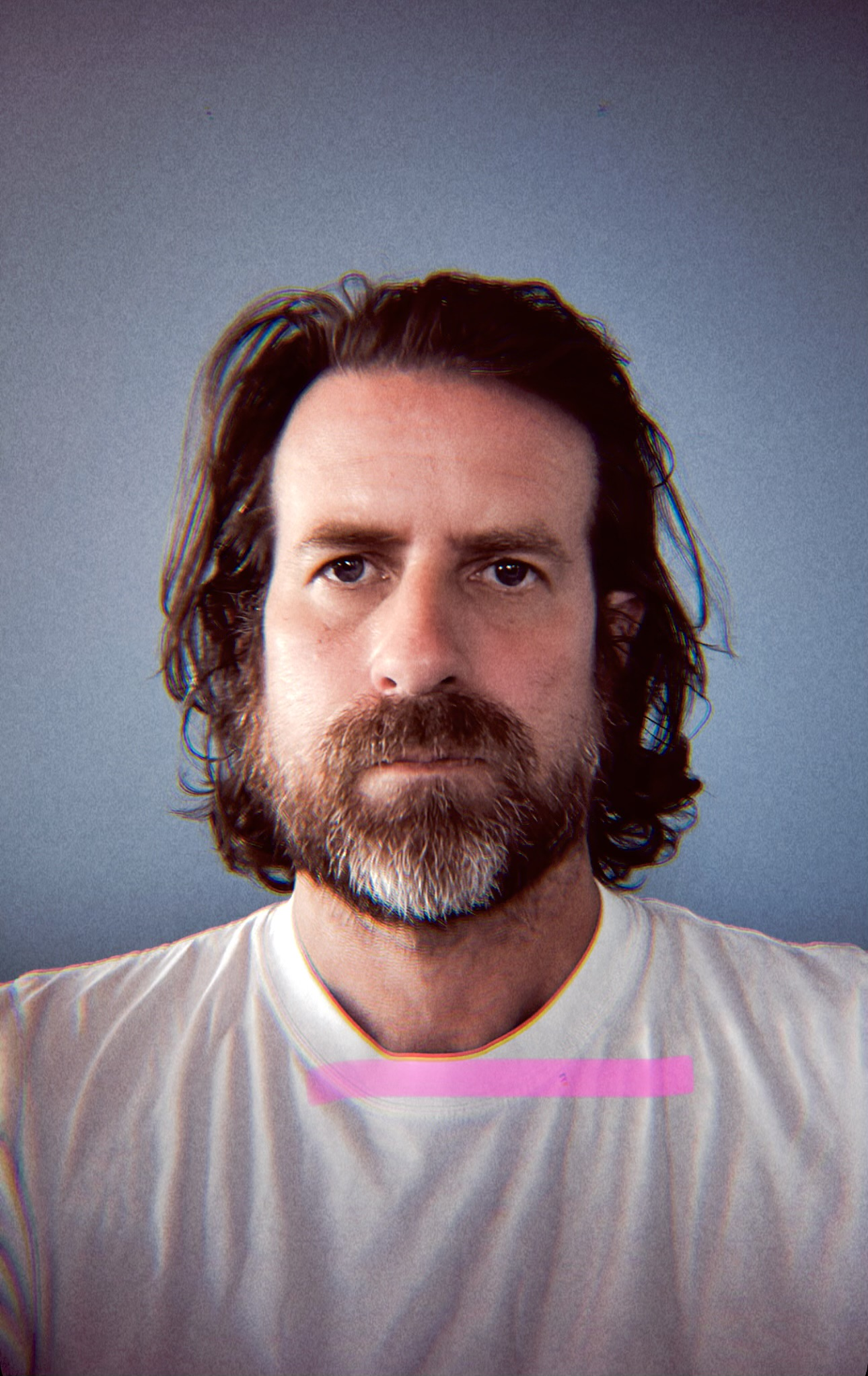

Background information
- Born: January 29, 1972 (age 54); Toronto, Ontario, Canada
- Genres: Indie Folk; Indie Rock; Chamber Pop; Folktronica; Electronica
- Occupations: Musician, producer, multimedia developer
- Instruments: Electric guitar, acoustic guitar, bass, piano, keyboards, synthesizers, drums, cello, omnichord, mellotron
- Years active: 1995–present
- Labels: Unfound Music; Random Sound Recordings
- Website: jonathangallivan.com

Jonathan Gallivan (born and currently living in Toronto, Ontario) is a producer, musician, and CTO for Reimagine AI in Montréal.

He co-founded the band My Brilliant Beast with Byron Kent Wong and Julia Galios in 1993. For 1995, My Brilliant Beast's song “Fall Away”, from their self-titled EP, was a Top 30 hit on Canadian radio and featured in an episode of the hit TV show Melrose Place.

He joined Random Media Core Inc. in 1993, a Canadian company dedicated to music, design, marketing, and new media. At the company, Gallivan developed the original "welcome" page for the launching of the Sympatico ISP, as well as the original website for TV Guide in Canada.

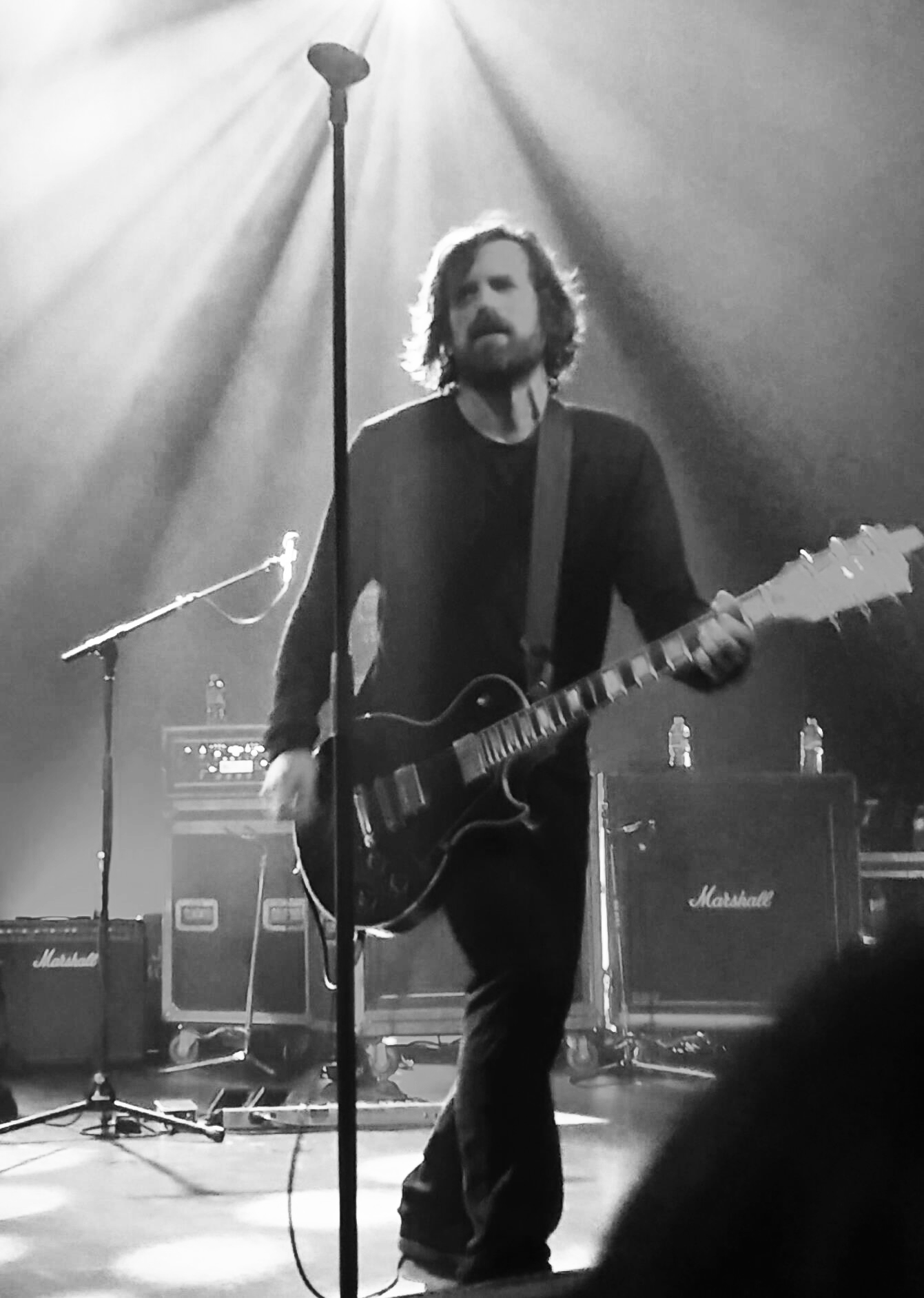
Jonathan Gallivan performing with Moist

In 2005, Gallivan composed the songs Blunt Like Solid (recorded by Dubtractive) and I Want You To Love Me (But You Just Let Me Go) (recorded by Jonny Gee Rogers) for Clement Virgo's film Lie With Me. He also co-wrote the song The Figure It Ate (recorded by Pong Console) with Byron Kent Wong, the film's composer, who was nominated for a Genie Award for the score.

Gallivan produced, recorded and engineered four albums for David Usher’s solo career, "Strange Birds", "Wake Up And Say Goodbye", "The Mile End Sessions", and "Songs from the Last Day on Earth".

Gallivan joined the band Moist as guitarist and background vocalist for their record Glory Under Dangerous Skies, which was released in September 2014. The follow-up End of the Ocean was released on January 14, 2022 during the height of the pandemic, and features his signature Gretsch Country Classic guitar and background vocals.

In 2021, Gallivan teamed up with Reimagine AI, an artificial intelligence creative studio specializing in creating AI-powered virtual beings and virtual being technology.

His latest output is a song called “Programs” released on New Year's Day 2025.

== Awards and recognition ==
- 2008 — Juno Award Nominee – Pop Album of the Year, co-producer/performer on the David Usher album Wake Up And Say Goodbye
- 2008 — SOCAN Pop Music Award for the song The Music by David Usher
- 2007 — SOCAN Number 1 award in recognition of The Music, by David Usher, reaching Number 1 on MuchMoreMusic's Countdown Chart
