= Hallucinations (David Usher album) =

Studio album by David Usher
- Released: September 9, 2003
- Recorded: at Metalworks Studios in Mississauga, Ontario
- Length: 51:24
- Label: EMI
- Producer: David Usher, Jeff Pearce, Mark Makoway, Byron Wong, Iestyn Polsen

David Usher chronology
Morning Orbit (2001)	Hallucinations (2003)	If God Had Curves (2005)

Hallucinations is David Usher's third studio album. It was released on September 9, 2003 via EMI label. Two singles, "Time of our Lives" and "Surfacing" were released off the record. Hallucinations follows two other solo albums, Little Songs (1998) and Morning Orbit (2001), and precedes a fourth solo album, If God Had Curves (2005). The album debuted at #6 on the Canadian Albums Chart, selling 6,300 copies in its first week. It is Usher's highest position on that chart of his solo career.

== Track listing ==
1. "Hallucinations"
2. "I'm Coming Down"
3. "Numb"
4. "Time of our Lives"
5. "Devil by my Side"
6. "Message Home"
7. "In This Light"
8. "Surfacing"
9. "Tomorrow Comes"
10. "Tidal"
11. "Fearless"
12. "If You Tolerate This Your Children Will Be Next" (Manic Street Preachers)
13. "St. Lawrence River" (live)

=== Bonus Disk ===
1. "In This Light" (rock version)
2. "Butterfly" (live)
3. "Forestfire" (live)

== Review ==
I've gotta give David Usher props. Unlike his 90s-era Canuck alt-rock heartthrob peers - see Jordy Birch, Edwin, et al. - he's managed to overcome the curse/blessing of his former band's sound and notoriety to succeed as a solo artist. Usher's third release is packed with the same intense emotion and extravagant songwriting as his last disc, Morning Orbit, although there's no single that wows like Black Black Heart. Here he settles into the role of Sade for Generation Y's indie rock kidlets, crafting rock-inspired chill-out music for booty accompaniment. The standout is the stark, haunting cover of My Brilliant Beast's If You Tolerate This Your Children Will Be Next.

—Now Magazine

== Singles ==
- Time Of Our Lives on YouTube
- Surfacing on YouTube
