= Musicor =

Musicor may refer to:

- Musicor Records, an American record label
- Disques Musicor, a Canadian record label
- Distribution Musicor, former name of the Canadian record label Distribution Select
