= Version 3.0 =

Studio album by Marie-Mai
- Released: September 22, 2009
- Recorded: 2008–2009
- Genres: Pop; rock
- Length: 41:29
- Label: Musicor
- Producer: Fred St-Gelais

Marie-Mai chronology
Dangereuse Attraction (2007)	Version 3.0 (2009)	Miroir (2012)

Singles from Version 3.0
- 1. "C'est Moi" Released: September 4, 2009

Version 3.0 is the third studio album by Canadian singer Marie-Mai. The album was produced by Fred St-Gelais. The album received platinum certification on 1 February 2011 for more than 80,000 copies sold.

"C'est moi" peaked on the Canadian Hot 100 in September 2009 at number 83.

== Track listing ==
All tracks are written by Marie-Mai Bouchard and Fred St-Gelais, except for tracks 4 and 8, which are additionally co-written by Rob Wells. All tracks are produced by St-Gelais.

No.	Title	Length
1.	"Déjà Loin"	3:31
2.	"J'attendrai Mon Tour"	3:25
3.	"C'est Moi"	3:26
4.	"Garde Tes Larmes"	3:14
5.	"Secrets"	3:43
6.	"Tout"	3:17
7.	"Pour une Fois"	3:36
8.	"Comme Avant"	3:31
9.	"Plaisirs Amers"	3:20
10.	"Rebâtir Notre Histoire"	3:35
11.	"Tu L'emportes Sur Moi"	3:18
12.	"Do You"	3:33
Total length:		41:29

== Personnel ==
- Marie-Mai – vocals, composer
- Fred St-Gelais - producer, guitar, bass, keyboard, percussion, drum, programming, mixing, mastering, arrangement
- John Nathaniel - production assistant, programming, digital publishing, composer, producer, mixing
- Maxime Lalanne – drum, programming
- Rob Wells – arrangement, composer, keyboard, programming
- Eric Speed - composer, producer, mixing, violin
- Robert Langlois – bass
- Étienne Ratthé - orchestration, cello
- Véronica Thomas - violin
- Pascale Gagnon – violin
- Ligia Paquin – alto
