= Dangereuse Attraction =

Studio album by Marie-Mai
- Released: August 28, 2007
- Recorded: 2007
- Genre: Pop; rock
- Length: 48:04
- Label: Musicor; Warner Music France
- Producer: Fred St-Gelais

Marie-Mai chronology
Inoxydable (2004)	Dangereuse Attraction (2007)	Version 3.0 (2009)

Dangereuse Attraction is the second studio album by Canadian singer Marie-Mai. The album was released on 28 August 2007 in Canada by Musicor and later, in France by Warner Music France, on 26 May 2008. The album was produced by Fred St-Gelais. The album was certified gold by Music Canada.

== Track listing ==
All tracks are written by Marie-Mai Bouchard and Fred St-Gelais, except where noted. All tracks are produced by St. Gelais.

Dangereuse Attraction track listing
No.	Title	Writer(s)	Length
1.	"Mentir"		3:57
2.	"Emmène-Moi"		3:29
3.	"Qui Prendra Ma Place"		3:33
4.	"Avec Elle"		4:24
5.	"Tôt ou Tard"	Bouchard; St-Gelais; Rob Wells; Christopher Ward; Evren Ozdemir	3:12
6.	"Ici Maintenant"	Bouchard; St-Gelais; Ali Thompson; Luke McMaster	2:59
7.	"Dangereuse Attraction"		2:56
8.	"Encore"		3:46
9.	"Mille Jours"	Bouchard	4:10
10.	"Cauchemar"		4:03
11.	"Elle Avance"		3:43
12.	"Sous un Ciel Sombre"	Bouchard; St-Gelais; Patrick LaFleur	3:55
13.	"La Prochaine Fois"		3:50
Total length:			48:04

== Personnel ==
- Marie-Mai – vocals, composer
- Fred St-Gelais - producer, guitar, bass, keyboard, percussion, drum, programming
- Rob Wells – arranger, composer, keyboard
- Martin Tremblay – keyboard
- Jimmy Guay – drum
- Marc Lessard – drum
- Maxime Lalanne – drum
- Veronica Thomas and Pascale Gagnon – violin
- Ligia Paquin – alto
