= Miroir (album) =

Studio album by Marie-Mai
- Released: September 17, 2012
- Recorded: 2012
- Genre: Pop; rock
- Length: 49:18
- Label: Musicor
- Producer: Fred St-Gelais

Marie-Mai chronology
Version 3.0 (2009)	Miroir (2012)	M (2014)

Singles from Miroir
- 1. "C.O.B.R.A." Released: August 14, 2012; 2. "Jamais Ailleurs (Quebec)" Released: October 31, 2012; 3. "Je Cours (France)" Released: December 10, 2012; 4. "Je Cours (Quebec)" Released: April 25th, 2013; 5. "Differents" Released: August 6th, 2013

Miroir is the fourth studio album by Canadian singer Marie-Mai. The album was produced by Fred St-Gelais. Most of the French titles were recorded in the spring of 2012, with the exception of "Sans Cri Ni Haine", which was released as a promotional single in France in February 2012. Three of the songs ("Young & Wired", "Riptide" and "Heart Attack"), were part of an English-language EP that was recorded in late 2010 but never released. Some French lines were added into "Heart Attack" during 2012 and despite Marie-Mai not being completely pleased with the results, it was included in the final track list as a special request from her mother, who loved the song.

== Release ==
C.O.B.R.A. was released as digital download on 14 August 2012. In an interview, Marie-Mai explained the song's inspiration: "C.O.B.R.A. is a rallying cry, an anthem to those who do not want to merge in the crowd, told Marie-Mai. Fred (St-Gelais, director) and I, we wanted to write a song that would find all its meaning on stage, during a show, with a contagious rhythm...Let yourself get bewitched by the Cobra!." The music video was filmed by director Jonathan Desbiens and produced by Patrick Chevrier and Outan Médias."C.O.B.R.A." debuted on the Canadian Hot 100 on 27 August 2012 at number 74.

== Track listing ==
All tracks are produced by Fred St-Gelais.

Mirroir track listing
No.	Title	Writer(s)	Length
1.	"C.O.B.R.A."	Marie-Mai Bouchard; Fred St-Gelais	3:26
2.	"Indestructible Toi"	Bouchard; St-Gelais	3:20
3.	"Jamais Ailleurs"	Bouchard; St-Gelais	3:22
4.	"Différents"	Bouchard; St-Gelais	3:28
5.	"Je Rêve de Nous"	Bouchard; St-Gelais	3:40
6.	"Si Les Mots"	Bouchard; St-Gelais	4:14
7.	"Toujours Là"	Bouchard; St-Gelais	3:16
8.	"Heart Attack"	Bouchard; St-Gelais; Nelson Minville	2:57
9.	"Je Cours"	Bouchard; St-Gelais; Minville	3:33
10.	"Survivants, Solitaires"	Bouchard; St-Gelais; Rob Wells	3:55
11.	"Laissez-moi Dormir"	Bouchard; St-Gelais	3:24
12.	"Young & Wired"	Bouchard; St-Gelais	2:44
13.	"Sans Cri Ni Haine"	Bouchard; Robin Carlsson; Alexander Kronlund; Klas Åhlund	3:46
14.	"Riptide"	Bouchard; St-Gelais	4:07
Total length:			49:18

Notes

- "Sans Cri Ni Haine" is a French-language version of Robyn's single "Call Your Girlfriend".

== Personnel ==
- Marie-Mai – vocals, composer
- Fred St-Gelais – producer, guitar, bass, keyboard, percussion, drum, programming, mixing, mastering, arrangement
- John Nathaniel – production assistant, programming, digital publishing, composer, producer, mixing
- Maxime Lalanne – drum, programming
- Rob Wells – arrangement, composer, keyboard, programming
- Eric Speed – composer, producer, mixing, violin
- Robert Langlois – bass
- Étienne Ratthé – orchestration, cello
- Véronica Thomas – violin
- Pascale Gagnon – violin
- Ligia Paquin – alto
