= Inoxydable =

Studio album by Marie-Mai
- Released: September 28, 2004
- Recorded: August 2004
- Genre: Pop; rock
- Length: 47:43
- Label: Musicor
- Producer: Fred St-Gelais

Marie-Mai chronology
Inoxydable (2004)	Dangereuse Attraction (2007)

Inoxydable is the first studio album by Canadian singer Marie-Mai, released on 28 September 2004. The album was then released in France on April 10, 2006. The album received platinum certification for selling more than 120,000 copies.

== Track listing ==
All tracks are produced by Fred St-Gelais. Source:

Inoxydable track listing
No.	Title	Writer(s)	Length
1.	"Il Faut Que Tu T'en Ailles"	Marie-Mai Bouchard; Fred St-Gelais; Richard Maheux; Antoine Sicotte	3:00
2.	"Inoxydable"	Dianne Cadieux; St-Gelais	4:07
3.	"Tu T'en Fous"	Patrik Lafleur; St-Gelais	3:13
4.	"En Hiver"	Cébastien; Roberta Michèle; David Quilico	3:06
5.	"Tous Les Chemins"	Lafleur; St-Gelais	4:17
6.	"Encore Une Nuit"	M. Bouchard	4:16
7.	"Un Million D'années"	St-Gelais	3:47
8.	"Rien"	M. Bouchard; Dave Richard; St-Gelais	3:51
9.	"Take the Money"	M. Bouchard; Martin Rannou; St-Gelais	4:06
10.	"Salaud!"	Romano Musumarra; Luc Plamondon	3:34
11.	"Entre Mes Mains"	Lafleur; St-Gelais	3:31
12.	"Chanson Pour Hier et Demain"	St-Gelais	3:34
13.	"Seule à Montréal"	Jean-Pierre Bouchard	3:27
Total length:			47:43

== Music videos ==
- Il Faut Que Tu T'en Ailles
- Tu T'en Fous
- Encore Une Nuit
- Rien

== Personnel ==
- Marie-Mai – Vocals, Composer
- Jean-Pierre Bouchard – Composer
- Romano Musumarra – Composer
- Luc Plamondon – Composer
- Pete Lesperance – Arranger
- Rob Wells – Arranger, Clavier, Programming
- Jeff Smallwood – Arranger, Guitar, Sound Recording
- Andy VanDette – Mastering
- Robert Langlois – Bass
