= Lindsay Robins =

Lindsay Robins (born December 18, 1986, in Montreal, Quebec) is a singer-songwriter who wrote and performed the theme song "What Would You Do" for the VJ Search reality series on MuchMusic, which went on to be the 2007 recipient of The North American Promax Award for Best Music Package/Theme Song. She wrote and performed music for the television series Instant Star and, in 2006, released a solo rock album, Dirty Chemistry, on Aquarius Records.

Dirty Chemistry was produced by the songwriters Christopher Ward and Fred St-Gelais who also worked with Alexz Johnson on the music for Instant Star. Robins appears on the soundtrack for the third season of Instant Star, singing a song called "Shooting Star". As noted by the executive producer of Instant Star, "...the more polished performances of songs like "Shooting Star" and last season's "Never Enough" have actually featured the voice of rising Canadian rock star Lindsay Robins." Three singles were released from Dirty Chemistry: "Freaks", "What Would You Do" and "I Can't Forget Your Face". (The music video for "I Can't Forget Your Face" was directed by Érik Canuel, who directed Bon Cop Bad Cop, one of the highest grossing Canadian films to date.) She has shared the stage with the likes of Simple Plan, Mobile and Eva Avila.

Robins has teamed up with Josh Rand, the guitarist of the band Stone Sour, and together they make up the hard rock band Moonshot. She also fronted the Toronto-based hard rock band Crooked Valentine.

== Discography ==
Dirty Chemistry

1. "Time Bomb" (Lindsay Robins, Fred St-Gelais, Christopher Ward)
2. "Breakdown" (Lindsay Robins, Fred St-Gelais, Christopher Ward)
3. "Freaks" (Lindsay Robins, Fred St-Gelais, Christopher Ward)
4. "Possessions" (Lindsay Robins, Fred St-Gelais, Christopher Ward)
5. "Lies" (Lindsay Robins, Fred St-Gelais, Christopher Ward)
6. "Catastrophe" (Lindsay Robins, Fred St-Gelais, Christopher Ward)
7. "Home" (Lindsay Robins, Fred St-Gelais, Christopher Ward)
8. "Sometimes" (Lindsay Robins, Fred St-Gelais, Christopher Ward)
9. "What Would You Do" (Lindsay Robins, Rob Wells, Christopher Ward)
10. "Through The Mirror" (Lindsay Robins, Fred St-Gelais, Christopher Ward)
11. "I Can't Forget Your Face" (Lindsay Robins, Fred St-Gelais, Christopher Ward)
12. "Terrified" (Lindsay Robins, Fred St-Gelais, Christopher Ward)
