= Wake Up and Say Goodbye =

Studio album by David Usher
- Released: September 23, 2008
- Genre: Adult Alternative
- Label: MapleMusic Recordings/Universal Music Canada
- Producer: David Usher, Jonathan Gallivan, Kevin Young, Fred St-Gelais (Drums)

David Usher chronology
| Strange Birds (2007) | Wake Up and Say Goodbye (2008) | The Mile End Sessions (2010) |

Singles from Wake Up and Say Goodbye
- 1. "Kill the Lights"; 2. "Wake Up and Say Goodbye"

Professional ratings
Review scores
| Source | Rating |
|---|---|
| AllMusic | 3.5/5 stars |

Wake Up and Say Goodbye is the sixth album by solo artist David Usher, released on September 23, 2008. Was nominated for a Juno award in 2009 for "Pop Album of the Year".

== Track listing ==
1. "The River"
2. "We Are Wolves Here (Electric City)"
3. "And So We Run"
4. "My Biggest Mistake"
5. "Wake Up and Say Goodbye"
6. "Kill the Lights"
7. "Everyday Things"
8. "I Am the Weapon"
9. "Airplanes"
10. "Secret Garden"
11. "When It Hurts"
12. "Speak/Listen"

Bonus tracks:

1. "Carry On (iTunes exclusive track, only available with pre-order)"
2. "Kill the Lights (featuring Marie-Mai)"
