= Songs from the Last Day on Earth =

Studio album by David Usher
- Released: October 2, 2012
- Genre: Pop, rock
- Length: 49:03
- Label: MapleMusic Recordings MRCD 6546

David Usher chronology
The Mile End Sessions (2010)	Songs from the Last Day on Earth (2012)	Let It Play (2016)

Songs from the Last Day on Earth is the eighth studio album by Canadian solo artist David Usher. It was released on October 2, 2012 via MapleMusic Recordings label.

== Track listing ==
No.	Title	Writer(s)	Length
1.	"See the Stars"	Guillaume Doiron / Jonathan Gallivan / David Usher	4:02
2.	"Rice Paper"	Guillaume Doiron / Jonathan Gallivan / David Usher	4:17
3.	"Winterstorm"	Guillaume Doiron / Jonathan Gallivan / David Usher	3:51
4.	"City of Light"	Guillaume Doiron / Jonathan Gallivan / David Usher	5:17
5.	"Lonely People"	Guillaume Doiron / Jonathan Gallivan / David Usher	4:10
6.	"Operator"	Jonathan Gallivan / David Usher	4:29
7.	"Stay"	Jonathan Gallivan / David Usher	2:56
8.	"Bitter Pill"	Jonathan Gallivan / David Usher	3:39
9.	"Burning Bridges"	Jonathan Gallivan / David Usher	3:24
10.	"All These Simple Things"	Guillaume Doiron / Jonathan Gallivan / David Usher	4:04
11.	"Partir Ailleurs"	Guillaume Doiron / Jonathan Gallivan / Gaële / David Usher	4:18
12.	"Repondez-Moi"	Marie-Mai Bouchard / Jonathan Gallivan / Fred St-Gelais / David Usher	4:36
Total length:			49:03

== Review ==
On his eighth solo album Songs From The Last Day On Earth David Usher explores the stirring emotions that give rise from examining the many ways that a life can be distilled down to a precious few collected moments. "This is really my first album with a central theme. It’s premised on a group of friends sharing their last day together and some thoughts on what, in the final reckoning, might stand out as the things that have stayed with them over a lifetime," explains Usher, giving a tacit nod to the inspiration for the album’s title. Songs From The Last Day On Earth reunites Usher with longtime collaborator and co-producer Jonathan Gallivan who was at the helm of his last record, The Mile End Sessions which included David’s first #1 french radio hit with "Je repars" (2011).

—CBC Music
