= Glory Under Dangerous Skies =

Studio album by Moist
- Released: October 7, 2014
- Recorded: Late 2013–early 2014; Toronto, Ontario, Canada
- Genre: Alternative rock
- Length: 49:55
- Label: Universal
- Producer: Mark Makoway

Moist chronology
Machine Punch Through: The Singles Collection (2001)	Glory Under Dangerous Skies (2014)	End of the Ocean (2021)

Singles from Glory Under Dangerous Skies
- 1. "Mechanical" Released: May 23, 2014; 2. "Black Roses" Released: September 8, 2014

Glory Under Dangerous Skies, originally titled Moist IV, is a 2014 studio album released by the Canadian alternative rock band Moist on October 7, 2014 through Universal Music Canada. The album is Moist's first studio offering since their 1999 album Mercedes 5 and Dime, and the first album to feature new members Jonathan Gallivan (on guitars and backing vocals), Louis Lalancette (on bass), and Francis Fillion (on drums). Original drummer Paul Wilcox had left the band just before its lengthy hiatus in 2000, and bassist Jeff Pearce left in early 2014 during the production of Glory Under Dangerous Skies.

The album was produced by original band guitarist Mark Makoway, and recorded over several months during the winter of 2013–2014. A nationwide tour to promote and celebrate the album occurred in late 2014. Said lead vocalist David Usher of the album, "It feels very natural doing this with the band again and everything has just fallen into place. We're really excited about the new music and the amazing reception we've had."

== Singles ==
The first single off the album, "Mechanical", was released on May 23, 2014, and a second single titled "Black Roses" was released on September 8, 2014. Both singles performed well on the Billboard Canada Rock Charts: Mechanical peaked at #3 and spent 22 weeks on the chart, while Black Roses peaked at #9 and spent 20 weeks on the chart.

== Commercial performance ==
The album debuted at number eight on the Canadian Albums Chart, selling 4,000 copies.

== Track listing ==
No.	Title	Length
1.	"Mechanical"	4:02
2.	"Broken"	4:21
3.	"Bayou"	4:12
4.	"Comes the Sun"	4:29
5.	"The River"	5:09
6.	"Glory Under Dangerous Skies"	3:30
7.	"Morning Dies Here"	4:09
8.	"Black Roses"	3:50
9.	"Still I Won't Look Down"	4:16
10.	"God Is In the White Rice"	4:46
11.	"All Forgiven"	2:19
12.	"We Are Water" (bonus track)	4:52

== Credits ==
- David Usher – lead vocals
- Jonathan Gallivan – guitars, backing vocals
- Mark Makoway – guitars, producer
- Kevin Young – keyboards, backing vocals
- Louis Lalancette – bass
- Francis Fillion – drums
- Jeff Pearce – bass, backing vocals
