= The Mile End Sessions =

Studio album by David Usher
- Released: September 14, 2010
- Genre: Adult Alternative
- Label: MapleMusic Recordings/Universal Music Canada mrcd 6528
- Producer: David Usher, Jonathan Gallivan, Kevin Young

David Usher chronology
Wake Up and Say Goodbye (2008)	The Mile End Sessions (2010)	Songs from the Last Day on Earth (2012)

The Mile End Sessions is the seventh album by solo artist David Usher. It was released on September 14, 2010 and is composed mostly of previously released songs re-recorded in acoustic arrangements. There were two singles released off the record.

== Overview ==
The record was produced by Jonathan Gallivan, who also plays guitar on the album. The album also includes a French track that features Marie-Mai called "Je repars", which is Usher's first French-language recording. It was the first single from the album and charted in the top 10 in Québec. The other new songs on the album are "Fall To Pieces" and "Sparkle And Shine".

Usher has said that the album title "is a nod to my neighbourhood in Montréal — Mile End... where these songs were re-shaped and where much of the album was made."

== Track listing ==
1. "Alone In The Universe (Acoustic)"
2. "Everyday Things (Acoustic) - featuring Cœur de pirate"
3. "The Music (Acoustic)"
4. "Prélude"
5. "Fall To Pieces"
6. "Je repars - featuring Marie-Mai"
7. "Sparkle And Shine (Acoustic)"
8. "St. Lawrence River (Acoustic)"
9. "My Way Out (Acoustic)"
10. "Black Black Heart (Acoustic)"
11. "And So We Run (Acoustic)"

CD Bonus Tracks

1. "Kill The Lights (Mile End Mix)"
2. "I’m Coming Down (Acoustic)"
3. "Je repars (Radio Remix) - featuring Marie-Mai"
4. "Tous Ces Petits Gestes (Radio Remix)"
5. "Everyday Things (feat. Cœur de Pirate) [Radio Remix]"

Pre-Order Bonus Tracks

1. "Tant de promesses (Fall To Pieces)" [MapleMusic Recordings Pre-Order Bonus Track]
2. "Souring (Acoustic)" [iTunes Pre-Order Bonus Track]

== Singles ==
- "Je repars - featuring Marie-Mai"
- "I'm Coming Down (Acoustic)"
