= Resurrection (Moist song) =

Single by Moist

from the album Creature
- Released: December 1996
- Studio: MH Studios Toronto (Toronto)
- Genre: Alternative rock
- Length: 3:58
- Label: EMI
- Songwriter: Moist
- Producers: Paul Northfield, Moist

Moist singles chronology
"Leave it Alone" (1996)	"Resurrection" (1996)	"Tangerine" (1997)

"Resurrection" is a song by Canadian alternative rock group Moist. It was released in December 1996 as the second single from their second studio album, Creature. It is the band's second highest charted single ever in Canada, reaching number 8 on Canada's RPM Singles Chart and number 4 on the Alternative chart in 1997.

== Reception ==
Billboard reviewed the song favourably, calling it "a killer slice of pop-injected angst". They went on to say that it is "as lyrically intelligent as it is sonically striking with its backgrounds".

== Charts ==
Chart (1997)	Peak position
Canada Top Singles (RPM)	8
Canada Alternative 30 (RPM)	4
US Active Rock Top 50 (Radio & Records)	37
