= Creature (Moist album) =

Studio album by Moist
- Released: October 1, 1996 (Canada); June 3, 1997 (United States)
- Studio: Le Studio, Morin Heights, QC & Silent Sound, Montreal, QC
- Genre: Alternative rock
- Length: 44:29
- Label: EMI
- Producer: Paul Northfield, Moist

Moist chronology
Silver (1994)	Creature (1996)	Mercedes 5 and Dime (1999)

Singles from Creature
- 1. "Leave It Alone" Released: 1996; 2. "Resurrection" Released: 1996; 3. "Tangerine" Released: 1997; 4. "Gasoline" Released: 1997

Professional ratings
Review scores
Source	Rating
Allmusic	2.5/5 stars

Creature is the second studio album by Canadian alternative rock band Moist, released in 1996. It features the singles "Leave It Alone", "Resurrection", "Tangerine", and "Gasoline", all of which were hits in Canada. The album was nominated for Album of the Year and Rock Album of the Year at the 1998 Juno Awards.

== Commercial performance ==
Creature debuted at #7 on The Record's Canadian Albums Chart. The album was certified triple Platinum in Canada in 1997 and was among the top forty best-selling albums of 1997 in that country. Between 1996 and 2016, Creature remained among the top forty best-selling albums by Canadian artists in Canada.

== Track listing ==
All songs written by Moist

No.	Title	Length
1.	"Hate"	3:47
2.	"Theme from Cola"	2:37
3.	"Resurrection"	3:58
4.	"Leave It Alone"	4:24
5.	"Creature"	4:18
6.	"Shotgun"	3:01
7.	"Disco Days"	2:32
8.	"Tangerine"	4:02
9.	"Better Than You"	3:55
10.	"Baby Skin Tattoo"	4:53
11.	"Ophelia"	3:49
12.	"Gasoline"	3:13

== Trivia ==
- "Ophelia" is featured on the first edition of MuchMusic's Big Shiny Tunes, which was released in 1996.
- "Tangerine" won two MuchMusic Video Awards, for Best Director and Best Video in 1997.

== Credits ==
- David Usher – vocals
- Mark Makoway – guitars
- Kevin Young – keyboards
- Jeff Pearce – bass
- Paul Wilcox – drums
- Matt Watkins – trumpet on "Creature"
- Claude Lamothe – cello on "Tangerine"
