= Black Black Heart =

2001 single by David Usher

Single by David Usher

from the album Morning Orbit
- Released: 2001
- Length: 3:26
- Label: EMI Music Canada
- Songwriters: David Usher; Jeff Pearce
- Producers: David Usher; Jeff Pearce; Mark Makoway; Jeff Martin

David Usher singles chronology
"Alone in the Universe" (2001)	"Black Black Heart" (2001)	"A Day in the Life" (2001)

"Black Black Heart" is a song written by David Usher and Jeff Pearce and released as the second single off Usher's 2001 album, Morning Orbit. It became a minor hit in Germany, the Netherlands, and Switzerland, and rose to number three in Greece, spending over 25 weeks on the country's singles chart. The music video won two MuchMusic Video Awards.

== Overview ==
There are three versions of the song. The album and radio remix versions feature Julie Galios from the band My Brilliant Beast. The harder rock version, which was found as a hidden track on the album and is also referred to as "Black Black Heart 2.0", features vocals by Kim Bingham. The chorus samples The Flower Duet (Sous le dôme épais), a famous duet for sopranos from Léo Delibes' opera Lakmé, as a hook.

== Music video ==
The music video for Black Black Heart features Usher singing the song in an apartment in a big house at night, with the scenes of him singing being intercut with various scenes showing other inhabitants of the house doing more or less usual things. It won two MuchMusic Video Awards for Best Post-Production (for Kurt Ritchie and Jeff Campbell) and Best Pop Video (for Usher) in 2002.

== Track listing ==
No.	Title	Length
1.	"Black Black Heart (CHR Mix)"	3:29
2.	"Black Black Heart (2.0)"	3:26
3.	"Too Close to the Sun"	3:54

== Charts ==
=== Weekly charts ===
Weekly chart performance for "Black Black Heart"
Chart (2002)	Peak position
Canada CHR (Nielsen BDS)	7
Germany (GfK)	82
Greece (IFPI)	3
Netherlands (Single Top 100)	87
Switzerland (Schweizer Hitparade)	45

=== Year-end charts ===
Year-end chart performance for "Black Black Heart"
Chart (2001)	Position
Canada Radio (Nielsen BDS)	93

Chart (2002)	Position
Canada Radio (Nielsen BDS)	33

== Cover versions ==
Rene Liu and Stanley Huang recorded a Chinese version called Travel Separately (分开旅行 / Fēnkāi lǚxíng), but only with the lyrics changed and became a huge success. Usher and Pearce were credited for the song. Usher also made a version of the tune in French, with popular Québec singer Marie-Mai singing on the track, as a special guest.
