= Leave It Alone (Moist song) =

Single by Moist

from the album Creature
- Released: September 1996
- Genre: Alternative rock
- Length: 4:24; 4:08 (edit)
- Label: EMI
- Songwriters: Mark Makoway; Jeff Pearce; David Usher; Paul Wilcox; Kevin Young
- Producers: Paul Northfield; Moist

Moist singles chronology
"Freaky Be Beautiful" (1995)	"Leave It Alone" (1996)	"Resurrection" (1996)

"Leave It Alone" is a song by Canadian alternative rock group Moist. It was released in September 1996 as the lead single from their second studio album, Creature. It is the band's highest-charting single in Canada, reaching number three on the RPM Top Singles chart and number six on the Alternative chart. The song was ranked number 10 on CILQ-FM's Top 107 songs of 1997.

== Charts ==
=== Weekly charts ===
Chart (1996)	Peak position
Canada Top Singles (RPM)	3
Canada Rock/Alternative (RPM)	6

=== Year-end charts ===
Chart (1996)	Position
Canada Top Singles (RPM)	40

== Release history ==
Region	Date	Format(s)	Label(s)	Ref.
Canada	September 1996	—N/a	EMI	
United States	October 20, 1997	Alternative radio	Arista	
