= Disques Musicor =

Les Disques Musicor is a Canadian record label based in Montreal, Quebec established in 2003. The first release on the label was a compilation of the French Canadian reality TV series Star Académie that went 5× Platinum. The label is distributed through Distribution Select and is a subsidiary of Québecor Média.

Les Disques Musicor has released albums by artists such as Marie-Mai, Étienne Drapeau, Lynda Thalie, Patrick Bruel, Gérard Lenorman, Marie-Élaine Thibert, Michel Pagliaro, and many more.
