= End of the Ocean =

Studio album by Moist
- Released: January 14, 2022
- Recorded: 2020–2021
- Genre: Alternative rock
- Label: Known Accomplice
- Producer: Mark Makoway

Moist chronology
Glory Under Dangerous Skies (2014)	End of the Ocean (2022)

Singles from End of the Ocean
- 1. "Tarantino (Bullet Kill Sex Love Thrill)" Released: January 29, 2021; 2. "End of the Ocean" Released: April 2, 2021; 3. "Put the Devil On It" Released: June 4, 2021

Professional ratings
Review scores
Source	Rating
Exclaim!	6/10

End of the Ocean is the fifth studio album from Canadian alternative rock band Moist. Originally set to be released on October 1, 2021, it was released on January 14, 2022. The album and its title track are centered around themes of human consumption and its "devastating results" on the planet.

The album, as with its predecessor, was produced by original band guitarist Mark Makoway. Original bassist Jeff Pearce, who had left the band during the production of Glory Under Dangerous Skies, returned for End of the Ocean.

== Production and content ==
The album's first single, "Tarantino (Bullet Kill Sex Love Thrill)", was released on January 29, 2021. Moist vocalist and lyricist David Usher explained that during the COVID-19 pandemic lockdowns, he went on a Quentin Tarantino binge, and "the song came out of a dream sparked by those images where we have lost all sense of ourselves – where there are no limits on our consumption and all we want is more. We deconstruct and reconstruct ourselves to fill an unfillable void and we just eat ourselves alive, and somehow, we still can’t wake up".

The title track, "End of the Ocean", was released as the album's second single on April 2, 2021. The song tackles human consumption and its devastating results on the earth. The music video for the song employs footage from Mateo Guez's 2009 film Off World, shot at Manila’s Smokey Mountain landfill, once home to 30,000 people before its removal in 2009. Usher speaks on the human desire to make money "at the expense of the planet," including the latest non-fungible token trend.

"Put the Devil On It" was released as the album's third single on June 8, 2021. The song continues focusing on the themes of consumption and materialism. Usher explained his inspiration for the song as follows: "What a tragic comedy the last 4 years have been. He who shall not be named has wiped away that thin layer of civility. The mirage. Out in the light, the ugly truth. They aren’t hiding anymore, so neither can we. Go team science! Put the devil on it."

"Dying for a Light in the Dark (We Are)" was released to music streaming services on September 17, 2021.

== Track listing ==
The album's track list consists of ten songs, which is the fewest songs on any Moist album to date.

No.	Title	Length
1.	"Ammunition"	4:41
2.	"End of the Ocean"	4:41
3.	"Put the Devil On It"	4:04
4.	"Flesh & Bone"	4:19
5.	"Tarantino (Bullet Kill Sex Love Thrill)"	3:31
6.	"The Millions"	3:50
7.	"Party's Over"	4:11
8.	"Tip of My Tongue"	4:03
9.	"High on It"	3:32
10.	"Dying for a Light in the Dark (We Are)"	4:31

== Personnel ==
- David Usher – lead vocals
- Jonathan Gallivan – guitars, backing vocals
- Mark Makoway – guitars, producer
- Kevin Young – keyboards, backing vocals
- Francis Fillion – drums
- Jeff Pearce – bass, backing vocals
