= Mercedes 5 and Dime =

Mercedes Five and Dime

Studio album by Moist
- Released: June 29, 1999 (Canada); June, 2000 (United States)
- Genre: Alternative rock
- Length: 55:19
- Labels: EMI Music Canada; Capitol Records (United States)
- Producer: David Leonard

Moist chronology
Creature (1996)	Mercedes Five and Dime (1999)	Machine Punch Through: The Singles Collection (2001)

Alternative cover
- US release cover

Professional ratings
Review scores
Source	Rating
Allmusic	4/5 stars

Mercedes Five and Dime is the third studio album released by the Canadian alternative rock band Moist. Released in Canada on June 29, 1999, and in the United States a year later, it includes the hits "Breathe" and "Underground". The album debuted at #7 on the Billboard Canadian Albums chart and #4 on the RPM Top Albums/CDs chart.

The album was released with different album covers for the Canadian and United States releases. The United States version has a yellow album cover while the Canadian release's cover is dark blue. This was Moist's last studio album before their 12-year hiatus began in 2001.

The track listings of the two releases also differ — the Canadian version contains the tracks "Mike Hammer" and "Liberation", while the U.S. release includes a re-recording of the band's 1994 hit "Push".

The album also contains an unlisted bonus track, entitled "Deliver Me".

On the Canadian release, both spines spell the album title as "Mercedes Five and Dime", matching the front cover, suggesting that this is the official spelling of the album's title. The spelling "MERCEDES Five AND DIME" is wrapped around the front and back covers (with "DIME" and "MER" on the back), while the traycard behind the disc has an image that spells the album title as "MERCEDES 5 & DIME".

Mercedes Five and Dime was nominated for "Best Rock Album" at the 2000 Juno Awards.

== Track listings ==
=== Canadian Release ===
1. "Underground" – 4:54
2. "Dogs" – 4:32
3. "Breathe" – 4:46
4. "Fish" – 4:08
5. "Comes And Goes" – 3:54
6. "Mike Hammer" – 4:30
7. "Tonight" – 4:06
8. "Alive" – 4:35
9. "Pleasing Falsetto" – 4:15
10. "Mandolin" – 3:39
11. "Place" – 3:58
12. "Liberation" – 4:51
13. "Deliver Me" – 3:07

=== US Release ===
1. "Underground" - 4:56
2. "Push" - 3:52
3. "Breathe" - 4:52
4. "Fish" - 4:08
5. "Comes And Goes" - 3:54
6. "Dogs" - 4:32
7. "Alive" - 4:36
8. "Tonight" - 4:06
9. "Pleasing Falsetto" - 4:15
10. "Mandolin" - 3:38
11. "Place" - 3:58
12. "Deliver Me" - 3:09

=== 2019 Remastered Vinyl Reissue ===
A1. "Underground" – 4:54
A2. "Dogs" – 4:32
A3. "Breathe" – 4:46
A4. "Fish" – 4:08
A5. "Comes And Goes" – 3:54
A6. "Deliver Me" - 3:07
B1. "Mike Hammer" – 4:30
B2. "Tonight" – 4:06
B3. "Alive" – 4:35
B4. "Pleasing Falsetto" – 4:15
B5. "Mandolin" – 3:39
B6. "Place" – 3:58

"Breathe" is featured on the album Big Shiny Tunes 4, as well as the soundtrack for the film Stir Of Echoes.

"Deliver Me" has a stray 14 kHz tone throughout. It is unknown where this noise came from.

== Singles ==
- Breathe
- Underground
- Comes and Goes (radio edit)

== Credits ==
- David Usher - vocals
- Jeff Pearce - bass
- Mark Makoway - guitar
- Kevin Young - keyboard/piano
- Paul Wilcox - drums
