= Morning Orbit =

Studio album by David Usher
- Released: July 31, 2001
- Recorded: at Metalworks Studios in Mississauga, Ontario
- Genres: Pop rock; alternative rock
- Length: 46:34
- Label: EMI
- Producers: David Usher; Jeff Pearce; Mark Makoway; Jeff Martin

David Usher chronology
Little Songs (1998)	Morning Orbit (2001)	Hallucinations (2003)

Professional ratings
Review scores
Source	Rating
AllMusic	4/5 stars

Morning Orbit is the second solo album by Canadian musician David Usher. Released on July 31, 2001, it was certified Platinum by the CRIA in April 2002. Morning Orbit won the 2002 Juno Award for Pop Album of the Year. The song "Joy in Small Places" features vocals by Canadian rapper Snow. The album also includes a cover of Tracy Chapman's "Fast Car".

== Singles ==
The album's lead single, "Alone in the Universe", was first made available for streaming in May 2001. The track peaked at no. 7 on Canada's Airplay chart and was the 35th most-played song on Canadian radio in 2001. "Black Black Heart" and "A Day in the Life" were also released as singles, and both songs were among the top 100 most-played songs on Canadian radio in 2002.

== Track listing ==
1. "How Are You?"
2. "Too Close to the Sun"
3. "Black Black Heart"
4. "Alone in the Universe"
5. "Butterfly"
6. "Joy in Small Places"
7. "A Day in the Life"
8. "My Way Out"
9. "Blinded"
10. "Fast Car"
11. "Closer"
12. "Black Black Heart 2.0 (Bonus Track)"

== Thai version ==
=== Disc 1 ===
1. "Alone in the Universe" (Thai version)
2. "How Are You?" (Thai version)
3. "Joy in Small Places"
4. "Black Black Heart" (CHR mix)
5. "Fast Car"
6. "Butterfly"
7. "Too Close to the Sun"
8. "A Day in the Life"
9. "Blinded"
10. "My Way Out"
11. "Closer"
12. "Alone in the Universe"
13. "How Are You?"
14. "Black Black Heart 2.0"

=== Disc 2 ===
1. Data track containing music videos for "Alone in the Universe", "My Way Out", "Black Black Heart", and "A Day in the Life"
2. "My Way Out" (Thai version)
3. "Alone in the Universe" (acoustic Thai version)
4. "Black Black Heart" (acoustic)
5. "My Way Out" (acoustic)

== Trivia ==
- "Alone in the Universe" is included on Big Shiny Tunes 6.

== Year-end charts ==
Chart (2001)	Peak position
Canadian Albums (Nielsen SoundScan)	111

Chart (2002)	Peak position
Canadian Alternative Albums (Nielsen SoundScan)	45
