= Breathe (Moist song) =

Single by Moist

from the album Mercedes 5 and Dime
- Released: May 1999
- Genre: Alternative rock
- Length: 4:46
- Label: EMI
- Songwriter(s): Mark Makoway, Jeff Pearce, David Usher, Paul Wilcox, Kevin Young
- Producer(s): David Leonard

Moist singles chronology
"Gasoline" (1997)	"Breathe" (1999)	"Underground" (1999)

"Breathe" is a song by Canadian alternative rock group Moist. It was released in May 1999 as the lead single from their third studio album, Mercedes 5 and Dime. The song peaked at number 28 on the Canadian RPM Singles Chart. The song is featured on the soundtrack of the 1999 film, Stir of Echoes.

== Tom Lord-Alge Mix ==
In 1999, the song was mixed by Tom Lord-Alge and released as a single. The TLA Mixed version is featured on the MuchMusic compilation album, Big Shiny Tunes 4.

== Music video ==
The music video for "Breathe" was directed by Phil Harder and reached #1 on MuchMusic Countdown.

== Charts ==
Chart (1999)	Peak position
Canadian RPM Singles Chart	28
Canadian RPM Rock Chart	5
Canadian RPM Adult Contemporary Chart	22
