= Silver (Moist album) =

Studio album by Moist
- Released: February 8, 1994
- Recorded: 1993–1994
- Studios: 8th Avenue Sound Studios, Vancouver, British Columbia, Canada
- Genre: Alternative rock
- Length: 54:00
- Label: Capitol/EMI
- Producers: Kevin Hamilton, Moist

Moist chronology
Silver (1994)	Creature (1996)

Singles from Silver
- 1. "Push" Released: 1994; 2. "Silver" Released: 1994; 3. "Believe Me" Released: 1994; 4. "Machine Punch Through" Released: 1995; 5. "Freaky Be Beautiful" Released: 1995

Silver is the debut studio album by the Canadian rock band Moist. It cost approximately $4,000 Canadian to make. The album includes the singles "Push", "Silver", and "Believe Me". It reached number 11 on The Record's Canadian Albums Chart. Silver is the band's most commercially successful album, being certified 4× platinum in Canada.

== Recording and release ==
In 1993, in an effort to get a record deal, the band decided to record a full-length album, which took place from December 26, 1993, to January 1, 1994; it included five songs from their 1993 independently released cassette. The album was titled Silver and released independently on February 8, 1994. It was distributed by EMI Music Publishing Canada, who had signed the band in 1993. By March, Moist signed with EMI Music Canada, and the label relaunched the album in April.

== Reception ==
Professional ratings
Review scores
Source	Rating
Allmusic	4/5 stars
Kerrang!	2/5 stars

AllMusic's James Chrispell wrote that "Moist's music can be described as an aural equivalent to the great northern rain forests of British Columbia" and that "Dark, angry songs show the influence absorbed from places south of their border, namely Seattle, but Silver is no copy of anyone else's style."

== Track listing ==
No.	Title	Length
1.	"Push"	3:50
2.	"Believe Me"	3:53
3.	"Kill for You"	3:35
4.	"Silver"	4:15
5.	"Freaky Be Beautiful"	3:59
6.	"Break Her Down"	4:27
7.	"Into Everything"	4:15
8.	"Picture Elvis"	3:12
9.	"Machine Punch Through"	4:26
10.	"This Shrieking Love"	5:14
11.	"Low Low Low" (ends at 3:15; followed by a hidden track: an alternate version of "Break Her Down" entitled "Morphine", after 4:00 of silence)	12:54

== Credits ==
- David Usher – vocals
- Jeff Pearce – bass guitar
- Mark Makoway – guitar
- Kevin Young – keyboard/piano
- Paul Wilcox – drums
- Produced by Moist and Kevin Hamilton
