= Push (Moist song) =

Single by Moist

from the album Silver
- Released: August 9, 1994 (US)
- Genre: Alternative rock
- Length: 3:50
- Label: Capitol, EMI
- Songwriter(s): Mark Makoway, Jeff Pearce, David Usher, Kevin Young
- Producer(s): Kevin Hamilton, Moist

Moist singles chronology
"Push" (1994)	"Silver" (1994)

"Push" is a song by Canadian alternative rock band Moist. It was released in 1994 as the lead single from the band's debut studio album, Silver. The song peaked at number 32 on Canada's Singles Chart. The song was also nominated for "Single of the Year" at the 1995 Juno Awards. In the U.S., it peaked at 37 on the Billboard Album Rock chart, making it their most successful single in the U.S. It is considered to be one of the band's signature songs.

== Music video ==
The music video for "Push" was shot on January 20, 1994, and cost $3000 Canadian dollars. The video was directed by Brenton Spencer and filmed in Black and white. The video reached #1 on the MuchMusic Countdown for the week of June 10, 1994. The video won the "Best Video" award at the 1995 Juno Awards. The video was critiqued on the 1995 Beavis and Butt-Head episode "Bad Dog" and was included on the Beavis and Butthead Mike Judge Collection DVD along with 10 other music videos.

== Charts ==
Chart (1994)	Peak position
Canada Top Singles (RPM)	32
US Billboard Hot Mainstream Rock Tracks	37
UK Official Singles Chart	20
