= Strange Birds =

Studio album by David Usher
- Released: March 20, 2007
- Genre: Adult rock alternative
- Length: 41:01
- Label: MapleMusic Recordings/Universal Music Canada
- Producer: Byron Wong, and Brian Malouf

David Usher chronology
If God Had Curves (2005)	Strange Birds (2007)	Wake Up and Say Goodbye (2008)

Singles from Strange Birds
- 1. "The Music"; 2. "Ugly Is Beautiful"; 3. "Some People Say"; 4. "So Far Down"

Professional ratings
Review scores
Source	Rating
AllMusic	3/5 stars

Strange Birds is the fifth studio album by David Usher, released on March 20, 2007 via MapleMusic Recordings and Universal Music Canada labels. Four singles were released from the album: "The Music", "Ugly Is Beautiful", "Some People Say" and "So Far Down". In an interview, Usher said that this album was inspired by New York and the idea of trying to find your voice in a city with a million other people screaming in it.

== Track listing ==
All songs written by David Usher, except "Some People Say", co-written by Byron Wong.
All songs arranged by David Usher, Jonathan Gallivan, Kevin Young, Chris Taylor-Munro and Byron Wong.

1. "The Music" – 3:36
2. "Brilliant" – 3:51
3. "Ugly Is Beautiful" – 4:00
4. "So Far Down" – 3:11
5. "Spotlight On" – 4:13
6. "Science" – 4:12
7. "White Flag" – 4:02
8. "Happy Endings" – 3:18
9. "Life Of Bees" – 3:11
10. "Blue" – 2:55
11. "Some People Say" – 4:32
12. "Sparkle and Shine" (Bonus Track)

== Personnel ==
- David Usher - vocals
- Jonathan Gallivan - electric, acoustic and bass guitars, backing vocals (track 2), layout and design
- Kevin Young - keyboards, synthesizers, mellotrons, pianos, backing vocals (tracks 1, 2, 4, 5, 6, 8, 11)
- Chris Taylor-Munro - drums and percussion, backing vocals (tracks 2, 6, 11)
- Julia Galios - bass synth (tracks 8, 9, 10), backing vocals (tracks 1, 2, 3, 6, 8, 9, 10)
- Byron Wong - bass guitar (track 11), glockenspiel (track 2), additional keyboards (tracks 2, 4, 5), piano (tracks 7, 11), backing vocals (track 2), production, mixing (track 11), engineering
- Michelle Laidman - backing vocals (tracks 2, 5, 7)
- Brian Malouf - percussion (track 3, additional production, mixing
- Lindsey Hilliard - violin (tracks 6, 9, 10)
- Matt Matteer - percussion (track 11), assistant engineering
- Ruben Huizenga - additional engineering
- Joao - mastering (Joao Carvalho Mastering)
- Raphael Mazzucco - photography
