= If God Had Curves =

Studio album by David Usher
- Released: April 26, 2005
- Recorded: 2004
- Genre: Acoustic, adult alternative
- Length: 37:44
- Label: Maple Music
- Producer: David Usher

David Usher chronology
Hallucinations (2003)	If God Had Curves (2005)	Strange Birds (2007)

If God Had Curves is the fourth album by David Usher, released in 2005. The album includes the first single, "Love Will Save the Day", as well as 10 other new songs. Guest musicians on the album include Bruce Cockburn and Tegan Quin. The album debuted at #12 on the Canadian Albums Chart.

== Track listing ==
1. "Long Goodbye"
2. "Love Will Save the Day"
3. "Souring"
4. "See You Fall"
5. "Hope (Tell Everyone)"
6. "Everything Is All Right By Me Now"
7. "Faithless"
8. "Hey Kids" (featuring Tegan Quin)
9. "The Wolves"
10. "Going Home"
11. "Soldiering"
12. "Mutations" (Bonus Track)

=== Singles ===
- Love Will Save The Day
- See You Fall
- Long Goodbye
