= Global Video =

Chain of British video rental stores

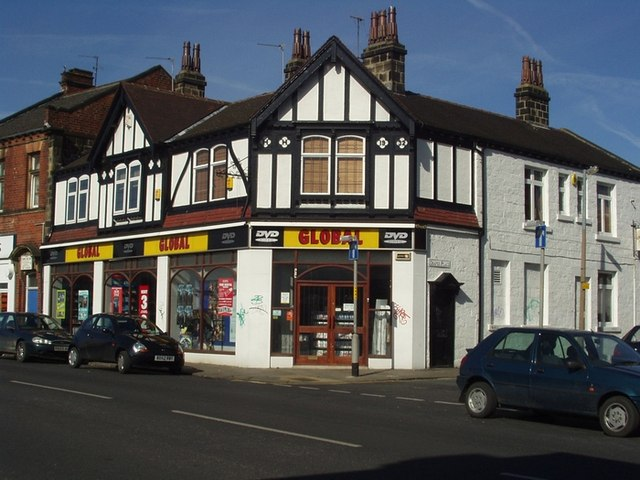
- Global in Headingley, Leeds (2006)
- Type: Private
- Industry: Retail
- Founded: 1985
- Founder: Maqbool Rasul
- Defunct: 2006
- Fate: Administration
- Successor: Global DVD (2006–2007)
- Headquarters: Glasgow, Scotland
- Key people: Maqbool Rasul (CEO)
- Products: Home Entertainment; Video Rental

Global Video plc was a chain of British video rental stores that ceased trading in 2006.

The chain's founder, Maqbool (Maq) Rasul, was ranked among Scotland’s Richest Asians in a 2005 survey published by Sunrise Radio. His business had a number of rivals such as Blockbuster Video, Tesco DVD and LoveFilm. It subsequently went into administration and in June 2006, the last store closed.

== See also ==
- Blockbuster Video
