= Jonas Tomalty =

Canadian singer

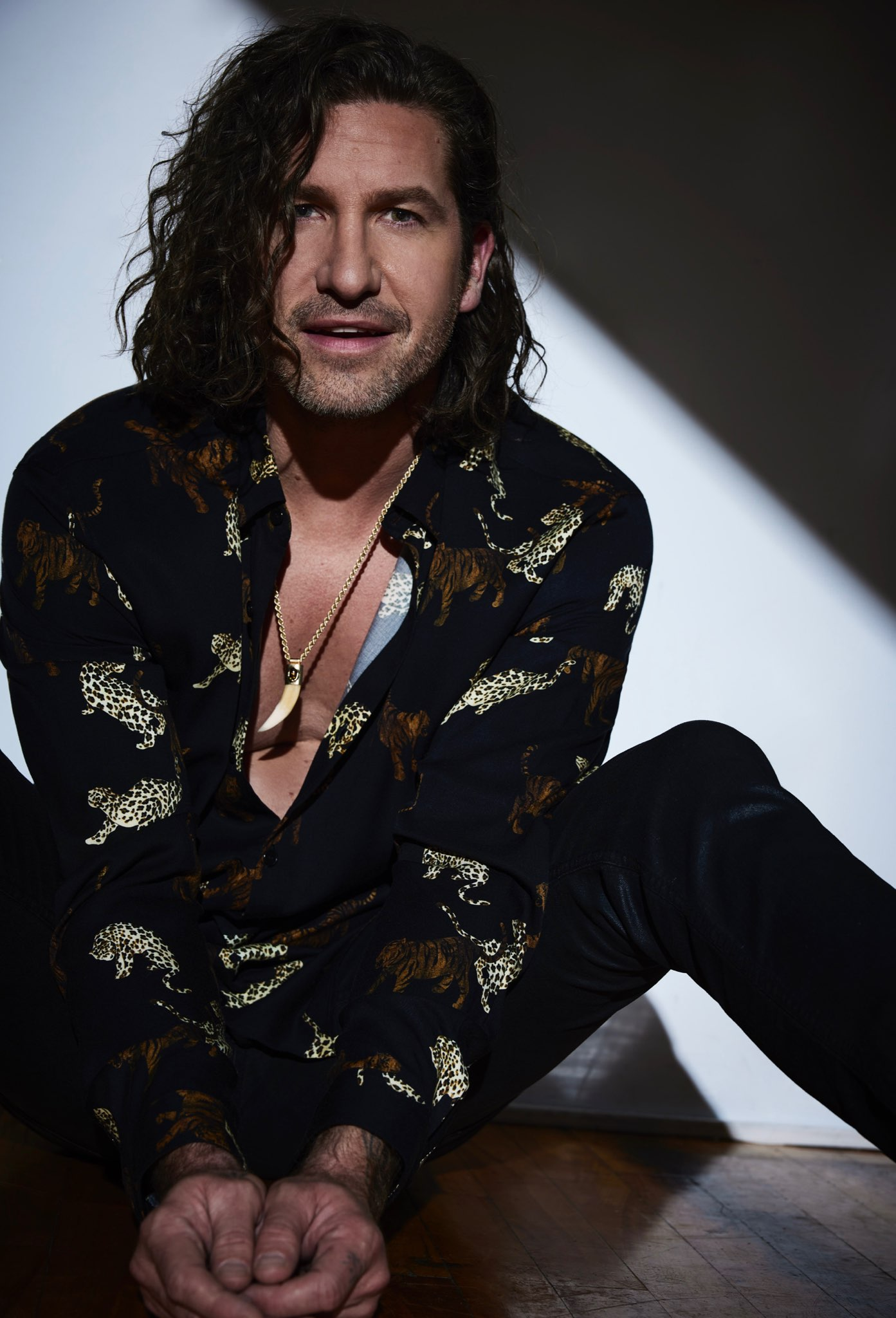

Background information
- Born: Jonas Richard Tomalty; Montreal, Quebec, Canada
- Genres: Rock, hard rock, soul, pop
- Occupation: Singer
- Years active: 1998–present
- Label: The Orchard/Sony
- Formerly of: Jonas & The Massive Attraction
- Website: jonastomalty.com

Jonas Richard Tomalty is a Canadian rock, soul and pop singer. First known as Jonas in 2004 as a solo singer, he was the lead singer of the Canadian rock band Jonas & The Massive Attraction from 2010 to 2017. In 2022, he released his fourth solo album, Undivided, as Jonas Tomalty.

== Career ==
=== Early career ===
Tomalty started a rock band called Rubberman in high school. In 1999, Rubberman won first prize at CHOM-FM's annual "CHOM L'Esprit" contest as well as the MusiquePlus "DémoClip" contest. The band signed to Donald K Donald's Aquarius Records label and released the Rubberman LP. That same year Tomalty formed a blues side project, Jonas & The Blues Blooded, featuring his father, Rick Tomalty, on harmonica.

=== Solo career ===
In 2004, Tomalty released a cover of "Edge of Seventeen" (originally performed by Stevie Nicks), which was the first track on the Jonas EP. It was followed by the original singles "Show Me", "Daddy" and "Like a River". After the release of the EP, Rubberman opened for Van Halen on their North American tour.

The EP earned two nominations at the Juno Awards of 2004 in the "New Artist of the Year" and "Rock Album of the Year" categories. His second album, Suite Life, was released in October 2006 and featured its first single "Bows and Arrows". In 2007, Tomalty released Promised Land, his third album. The album was never distributed outside of Canada due to a conflict between the band and their record label, which resulted in the label dropping the band. Afterwards, Jonas & The Massive Attraction went on a cross-Canadian tour with Collective Soul.

=== Jonas & The Massive Attraction ===
Jonas & The Massive Attraction
- Origin: Montreal, Quebec, Canada
- Genres: Rock, Hard rock
- Years active: 2010–present
- Label: Big Slice Records
- Members: Jonas Tomalty; Steve Nadeau; Francis Fugere; Julien Martre; Gabriel Laprade
- Past members: Domenic Romanelli; Francis Fillion; Jean-Sébastien Bacciu; Martin Lavallée; Ange E. Curcio
- Website: jonasandthemassiveattraction.com

In 2010 Jonas formed Jonas & The Massive Attraction and released the album "Big Slice" The first single "Big Slice" was released to radio across Canada and Europe. The band toured Canada and Europe several times over the next 3 years.

The 2013 album release Live Out Loud (co-written and produced by Marti Frederiksen) was a success, with "Respire" reaching #2 on the Quebec Francophone charts. The second Francophone adaptation "Je Crie Ton Nom" (co-written by Simon Wilcox, Nelson Minville and Mark Holman) became Jonas' first SOCAN #1 single. Jonas subsequently collaborated with producer Fred St-Gelais and singer with Marie-Mai on the single "Jamais Trop Tard", which reached #1 on the charts. The trio subsequently collaborated on the single "Christmas Calling", written by Tomalty.

In 2014, they released Album X as Jonas & The Massive Attraction. The album included seven original songs, such as "Lifeline" (co-written by Raine Maida of Our Lady Peace), and 3 re-recordings of past successes such as "Bows & Arrows", "Daddy" and "Burn the House Down". The band toured this album for the next few years and cut a live version of the show for the release of Live & Electric in 2017.

In April 2022 he released the album "Jonas Tomalty Undivided" with a new band and adding his family name to the project.

== Discography ==
=== As Jonas ===
- 2004: Jonas
- 2006: Suite Life
- 2007: Promised Land (compilation album of Jonas and Suite Life)

=== As Jonas and the Massive Attraction ===
- 2010: Big Slice
- 2011: Big Slice Unplugged EP
- 2011: Big Slice: Deluxe Edition (re-release of Big Slice that includes the EP)
- 2012: Unplugged
- 2013: Live Out Loud
- 2014: X (tenth-anniversary album including seven new songs and three remixes)
- 2017: Live & Electric (live album)

== Videography ==
- 2005: Jonas Live ...As We Roll! (DVD)
- 2007: La Quête
- 2009: Live at the Bell Centre (DVD)
- 2012: Big Slice Tour 2012 / Live in Germany at Rockpalast
