= Little Songs (David Usher album) =

Studio album by David Usher
- Released: March 17, 1998
- Genre: Pop, rock
- Length: 33:03
- Label: EMI Music Canada 7243 8 23115 2 2
- Producer: Paul Northfield, David Ka Lik Wong, Paul Wong

David Usher chronology
Little Songs (1998)	Morning Orbit (2001)

Professional ratings
Review scores
Source	Rating
AllMusic	3/5 stars

Little Songs is the debut solo album by Canadian rock band, Moist's, frontman David Usher. It was released on March 17, 1998 via EMI Music Canada label. Three singles, "Forestfire", "Jesus Was My Girl", and "St Lawrence River" were also released off the record.

== Track listing ==
All tracks are written by David Usher

No.	Title	Length
1.	"Trickster"	3:24
2.	"St. Lawrence River"	4:13
3.	"Jesus Was My Girl"	3:17
4.	"Unholy, Dirty and Beautiful"	3:44
5.	"Forestfire"	3:38
6.	"Baby Skin Tattoo"	3:34
7.	"F Train"	2:26
8.	"Million"	2:51
9.	"Final Thoughts and the Last Day on Earth"	3:00
10.	"Mood Song"	2:56
Total length:		33:03
