= Karim Ouellet =

Canadian pop singer-songwriter (1984–2022)

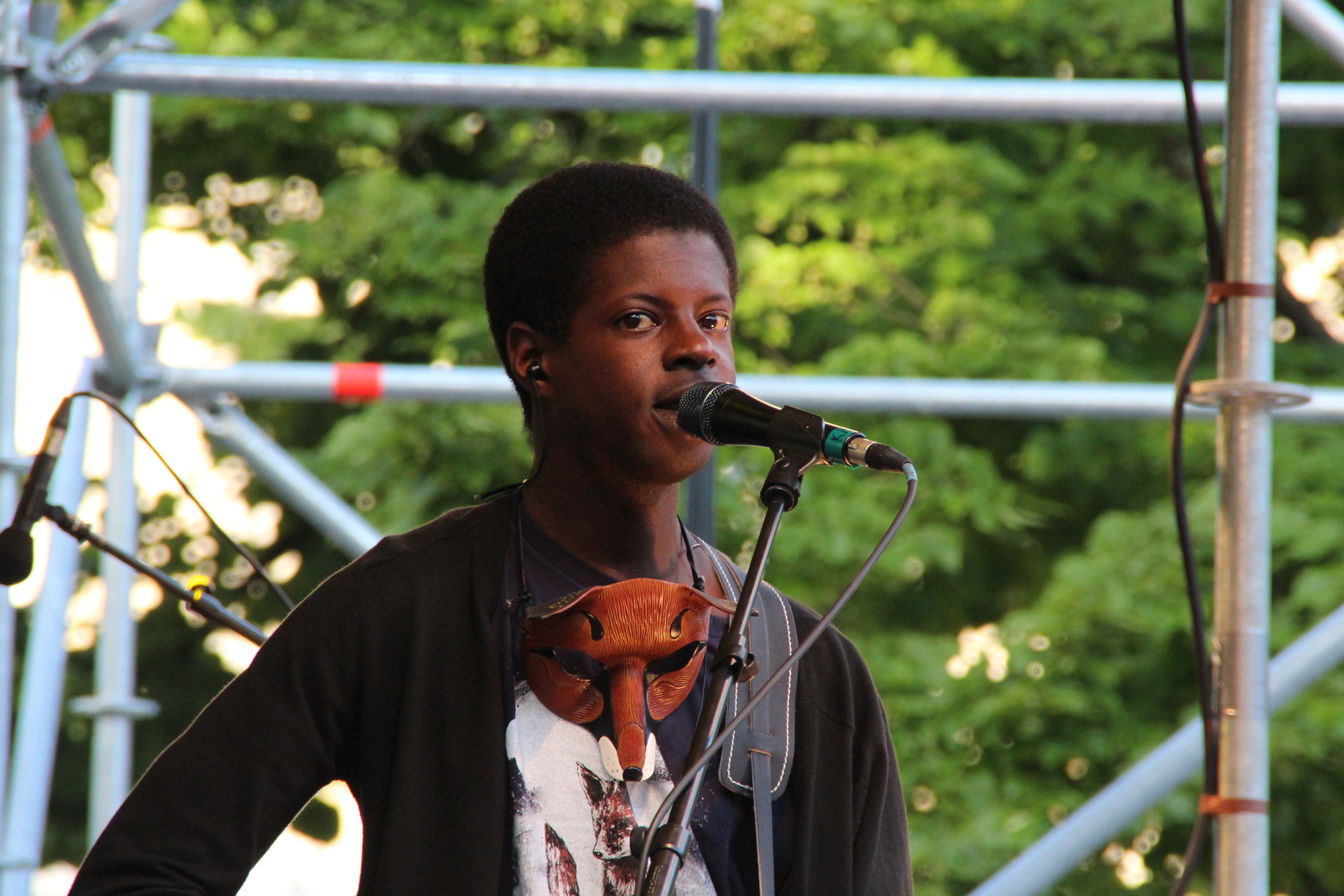
- Ouellet in 2013

Background information
- Born: December 8, 1984; Dakar, Senegal
- Origin: Canada
- Died: November 15, 2021 (aged 36) Quebec City, Quebec, Canada
- Genres: Folk, pop, hip hop
- Occupations: Musician, singer-songwriter
- Instruments: Vocals, guitar
- Years active: 2011–2021
- Website: https://web.archive.org/web/20160220003832/http://karimouellet.ca/

Karim Ouellet (December 8, 1984 – November 15, 2021) was a Senegalese-born Canadian pop singer-songwriter. He released three albums between 2011 and 2016; his second album, Fox, won a Juno Award in 2014.

== Early life ==
Ouellet was born in Dakar, Senegal, on December 8, 1984. He was adopted by Canadian diplomats at the age of one. He lived in France, Rwanda and Tunisia, before his family returned to live in Quebec City when he was 15. Ouellet learned to play the piano, percussion, and guitar as a child, and recounted composing his first song when he was seven. He took up the electric guitar as a teenager, and began playing with local bands. He met Claude Bégin in around 2005; Bégin co-wrote the lyrics and music for Ouellet's first three albums.

== Career ==
Ouellet released his debut album, Plume, in 2011, and was the second-place finisher in that year's Francouvertes competition. He toured extensively, including appearances at the Francofolies de La Rochelle, Osheaga, and SXSW festivals.

He followed up with Fox in November 2012. He received three nominations at the Félix Awards in 2013, including Best Male Singer, Best Single for "L'Amour" and Pop Album of the Year. He was also designated as best new artist by Radio-Canada that year. Fox won the Francophone Album of the Year at the Juno Awards of 2014.

His third album, Trente, was released in March 2016. He followed up later the same year with Aikido, a downloadable free mini-album.

Ouellet's music followed a folk-pop style with some reggae and African music influences. He was also a frequent collaborator with several hip hop groups, including CEA and Movèzerbe.

On June 20th, 2023, the Quebec City municipal council adopted a proposition renaming the Lucien-Borne park to the Karim Ouellet park. 80% of the 200 people surveyed in the council voted for the change while 10% of those were opposed. The park, located in the Montcalm sector of Quebec City, has a mural paying tribute to 15 influential Afro-Quebecers, among whom is Karim Ouellet.

== Death ==
One month after what would have been his 37th birthday, Ouellet was found dead on the evening of January 17, 2022, at L'Unisson studio in Quebec City's Saint-Roch neighbourhood. While foul play was ruled out by local police, his death prompted an investigation by the municipal coroner’s office. He was reportedly working on his fourth album at the time. The coroner's report indicated that Ouellet had died two full months before his body was found, on November 15, 2021, and ruled that his cause of death was diabetic ketoacidosis. The coroner also noted that Ouellet suffered from substance abuse disorder since 2019 and that methamphetamine was found in his blood and cocaine was found in the studio where he died. His substance abuse disorder contributed to Ouellet not properly managing his type 1 diabetes and being treated for diabetic ketoacidosis several times.

== Personal life ==
Ouellet's sister, Sarahmée, is also a musician. He served as the French-language spokesman for Black History Month in Canada in 2018.

In 2023, Sarahmée and the Grand Théâtre de Québec announced a new award for emerging musicians from the Quebec City region in Ouellet's memory. The prize will award $7,500, and a full-length show at the Grand Théâtre, to the winner.

== Discography ==
- Leçons d'amour étrange EP (2009)
- Plume (2011)
- Fox (2012)
- Trente (2016)
- Aikido EP (2016)
