= Monogrenade =

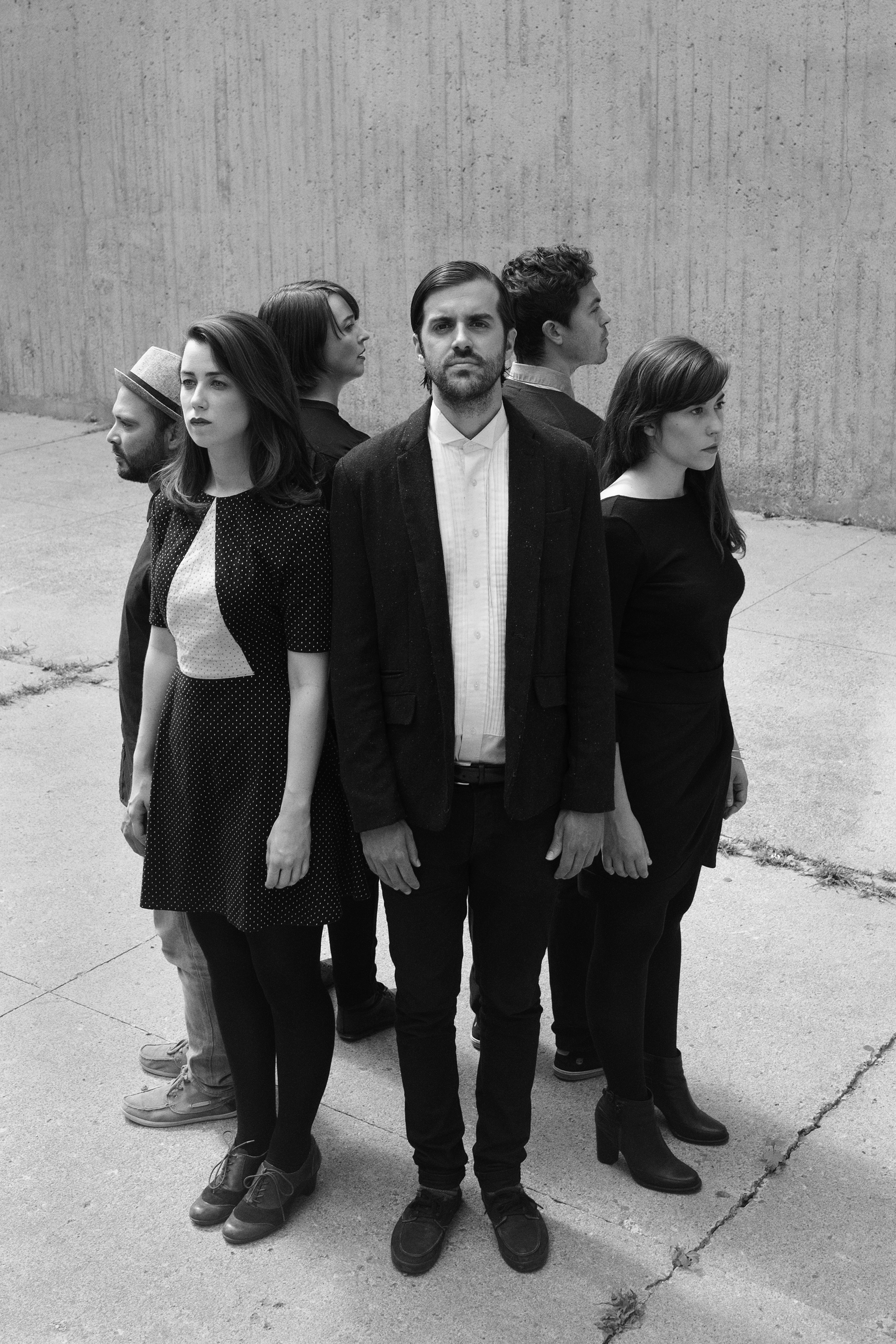

Background information
- Origin: Montreal, Quebec, Canada
- Genre: Indie pop
- Years active: 2008 - present
- Label: Bonsound Records
- Members: Jean-Michel Pigeon; François Lessard; Marianne Houle; Mathieu Collette
- Website: www.monogrenade.com

Monogrenade is a francophone band based in Montreal, Quebec, Canada.

== History ==
After releasing their first EP in 2009, entitled La saveur des fruits on Paper Bag Records, they came in second place at the 2010 edition of Les Francouvertes.

The band gained attention when the video for their song Ce soir was featured on Mashable's list of Top 10 Stop-Motion Videos on Youtube.

In 2011, they released their first full-length album Tantale on Bonsound Records. Their second album, Composite, followed in 2014.

== Band members ==
- Jean-Michel Pigeon (lyrics, vocals, guitar and keyboards)
- François Lessard (bass, guitar)
- Marianne Houle (cello)
- Mathieu Collette (drums)

== Discography ==
- La saveur des fruits (2009, Paper Bag Records)
- Tantale (2011, Bonsound Records)
- Composite (2014)
