= Byron Wong =

Canadian record producer

- Birth name: Byron Kent Wong
- Born: Vancouver, British Columbia, Canada
- Occupation(s): Music producer, music director, musician

Byron Kent Wong (born in Vancouver, British Columbia) is a Toronto and Los Angeles–based producer, musician, director and entrepreneur.

He founded Random Media Core Inc, in 1993, a Canadian company dedicated to music, design, marketing, and new media.

He hosted and co-produced Citytv's The NewMusic from 1997 to 1999. The New Music was one of the longest running music journalism TV programs in the world and pioneered both in-depth and irreverent interviews and presentations of music, culture, celebrity and technology.

In 1999 he co-founded Blue Spark, with entrepreneur, Kevin Bartus. Bluespark became one Canada's premiere web and e-commerce development companies. In 2004 it was acquired by OnX Enterprise Solutions, which in 2006 re-branded as Momentum. Clients included Bell, Rogers, CHUM, Purolator, The National Ballet, TIFF, and dozens of Fortune 500 Companies from across North America.

2011 saw the launch of zero11zero, a company dedicated to the convergence of motion media, new media, music, artist development, publishing and creative strategy. Recent projects and clients include the Toronto Blue Jays, Maclaren McCann/Nuit Blanche, +tongtong, the Toronto Symphony Orchestra and IMAX

Byron also serves as Managing Director for nVoid Art Tech Ltd, who have developed interactive processes and controls for projects with Nike, Google, Under Armour, and Kanye West.

As a music and TV/media producer, he has worked with The Crystal Method, The Eurythmics, David Usher, Delerium, David Bowie, Beck, Ben Harper, and many others. Other work includes albums with Montreal's Hexes and Ohs, Winhara, Tyler Yarema, Roger Mooking, and remixes with and for Glenn Morrison, Craig Armstrong, Lange, Mendo, Blank & Jones, and New Order's Bernard Sumner. Recent work includes mixes for The Sheepdogs, City and Colour, Yukon Blonde, Kendrick Lamar, Frankie Whyte and collaborations with Duncan Coutts of Our Lady Peace and Dave Hamelin of the Stills and Eight and a Half.

Byron was nominated for a Genie for his work scoring Lie With Me. He was co-nominated for another Genie for Best Original Song for the film, Poor Boy's Game. He scored the feature film, Off World, written and directed by Mateo Guez and served as co-producer.

He produced the 2013 ProMax Sports Media Award nominated documentary, "4 Days in April" about Canadian golfer, Mike Weir.

Currently in production is: "Meza", a fictional action-based feature, directed by James Mark and "Ill Intentions", a documentary based in the Yukon, Canada - marking Byron's directorial debut.

== Awards and recognition ==
- The music composer for over 50 Promax/BDA award-winning broadcast spots produced by Cuppa Coffee Animation, Astral Media and Project10
- 2006: 26th Genie Awards, nominee in Original Score category for the film Lie With Me, of which the song "Saviour" by Annelise Noronha has gained notoriety on the Internet Movie Database among curious fans longing to learn more about the enigmatic artist and her music. The song, which played only during the closing credits, is not credited in the film's soundtrack listing as it was added after the titles had been completed. Byron has been quoted as saying "Saviour" is one of his all-time favorite Canadian Songs.
- 2008: Genie Nominee – Best Original Song, "Breathe", for the film 'Poor Boy's Game'
- 2008: ReelWorld Trailblazer Award
- 2010 Best Feature Film Award, ReelWorld 2010
- 2013 ProMax Sports Media Award Nominated Documentary, "4 Days in April"
- 2016 Emmy Nominated Short Sports Documentary, "Jason Day: Never Say Die"
