= Rob Wells =

Canadian musician, producer (b. 1972)

- Born: 1971 or 1972 (age 54–55)
- Origin: Peterborough, Ontario, Canada
- Genres: Pop, pop rock, hip hop, electronica
- Occupations: Record producer, songwriter & musician
- Instruments: Piano, keyboards, programming, Drums
- Years active: 2003–present
- Website: wearethefourthfloor.com

Rob Wells (born 1971/1972) is a Canadian producer and songwriter, and is one half of music production team "The Fourth Floor" with award-winning singer/songwriter/recording artist Shobha.

Artists that Wells has worked with includes Ariana Grande, Selena Gomez, Justin Bieber, Alex Aiono, Adam Lambert, Nick Lachey, Backstreet Boys, Mika, Kai, Paloma Faith, Katharine McPhee, Corey Hart, Nelly Furtado, The Struts, Big Time Rush, Cyndi Lauper, Boyzone, Pixie Lott, Maxi Priest, Eva Avila, David Archuleta, Victoria Duffield, Keshia Chanté, Olivia Newton-John, Miranda Cosgrove, Daisy Dares You, Ria Mae, Bobby Bazini, Shiloh, Divine Brown, Tyler Shaw, RyanDan and Ry X.

His work has been featured on So You Think You Can Dance, Dancing with the Stars, One Tree Hill, The View, Late Show with David Letterman, Laguna Beach, House of Carters, Degrassi: The Next Generation, Instant Star, The Smurfs 2, One for the Money, StreetDance 3D and Flicka.

In 2005, Wells and fellow Canadian Christopher Ward placed first in the International Songwriting Competition's Top40/Pop Category with their song "There's Us", which was later recorded by Alexz Johnson, Backstreet Boys and Jennifer Ewbank.

Wells, along with Fred St-Gelais and Marie-Mai, received a SOCAN #1 award for Marie-Mai's "Comme Avant", which remained at #1 for 11 weeks in a row in 2011. He also received a SOCAN #1 award for Matt Dusk's "All About Me", having reached the top of the Canadian AC Radio Charts in August 2006, and a SOCAN #1 award for Marc Dupré's "Un coup sur mon cœur".

Wells appeared on an episode of House of Carters as a music producer. He has also appeared on 4 seasons of YTV's The Next Star as a music producer.

In 2013, Wells was named by a The Mississauga News online poll as the 8th most influential person living in Mississauga, Canada, and received a star on the Mississauga Music Walk of Fame in 2015.
