= David Usher =

Canadian musician (born 1966)

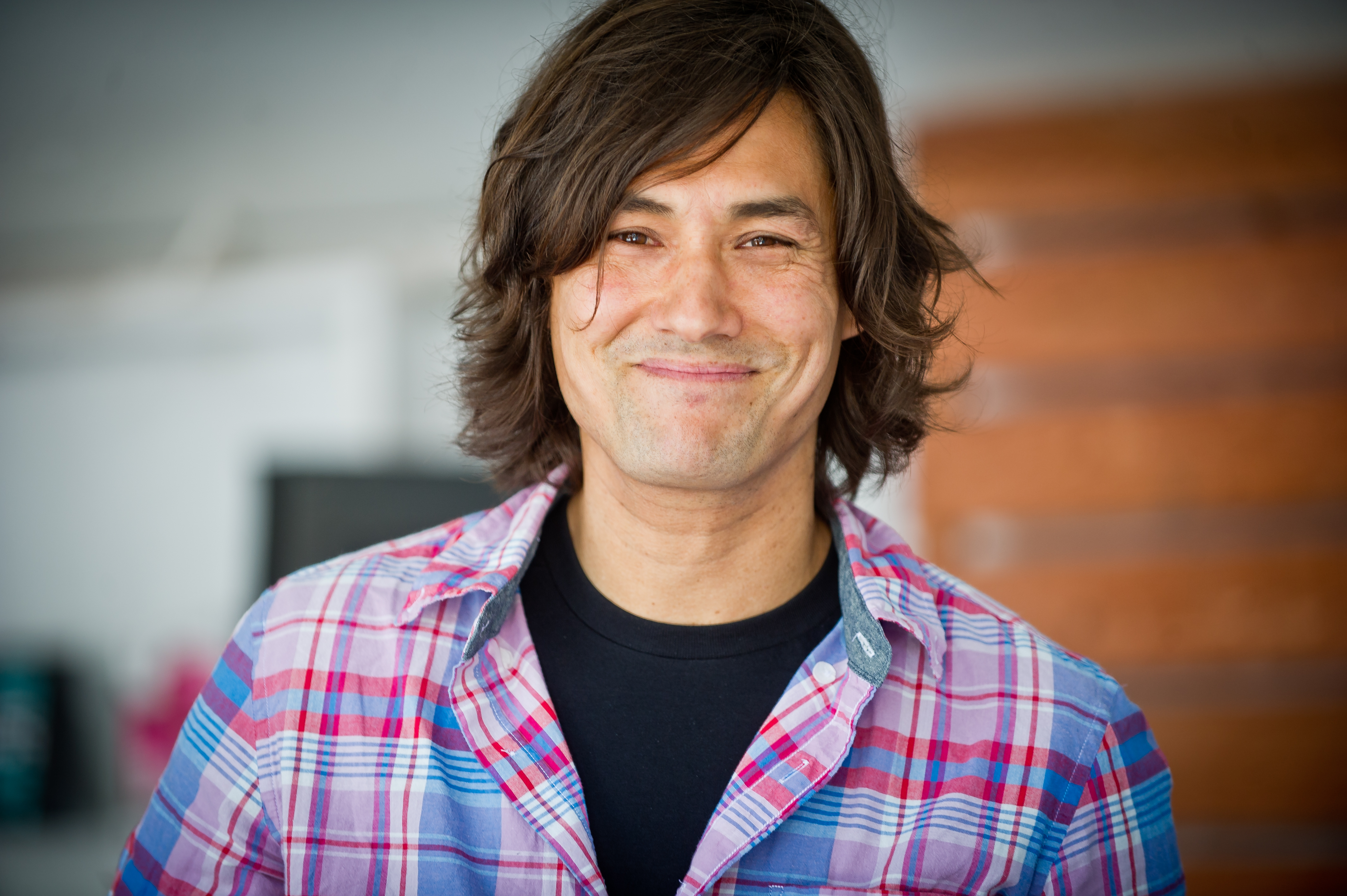
- Usher in 2012

Background information
- Born: April 24, 1966 (age 60); Oxford, England
- Genres: Rock; pop; alternative rock
- Occupations: musician; author; speaker
- Instruments: vocals; guitar; keyboards
- Years active: 1992–present
- Labels: Universal Music; Capitol; Maple
- Member of: Moist
- Website: davidusher.com

David Usher (born April 24, 1966) is a Canadian musician, best-selling author, and activist best known as the frontman for the band Moist. He has also released a number of solo albums. He is the founder of Reimagine AI, an artificial intelligence creative studio.

== Early life ==
David Usher was born in Oxford, England to Thai Buddhist artist Samphan Usher and Queen's University economics professor Dan Usher. He has lived in various places such as Malaysia, New York City, California and Thailand since early childhood, before his family settled in Kingston, Ontario. He attended high school at Kingston Collegiate and Vocational Institute at the same time that Gord Downie of The Tragically Hip and Hugh Dillon of the Headstones attended the school. Usher attended Queen's University for one semester before transferring to Simon Fraser University in Burnaby, British Columbia, majoring in political science.

== Career ==
While studying in Vancouver, Usher helped form the band Moist, composed of Usher on vocals, Mark Makoway on guitars, Jeff Pearce on bass, Kevin Young, who, like Usher, had moved to Vancouver from Kingston, on keyboards, and Paul Wilcox on drums. Usher became the principal songwriter for the band.

Moist's debut album Silver was released in 1994 and went on to achieve quadruple-platinum status, selling 400,000 copies in Canada. Their sophomore album, titled Creature, was released in 1996 and reached triple-platinum status, selling over 300,000 copies.

In 1998, Usher took a year to work on his own recordings. He released his first solo album, Little Songs. Most of the album was recorded in the kitchen of David's apartment. The album contains a track titled "Baby Skin Tattoo", which bears no relation to the song of the same name on the Moist album Creature.

In 1999, Moist released their third album, titled Mercedes 5 and Dime, once again achieving multi-platinum status. They followed this with a compilation album and DVD in 2001, titled Machine Punch Through: The Singles Collection, and thereafter entered a hiatus period that would last twelve years.

Usher continued with his solo career, releasing his second solo album, Morning Orbit, which sold 90,000 copies. The song "Alone in the Universe" was released as the first single, and the album featured collaborations with some members of Moist and with several figures of the Canadian music scene including Jagori Tanna and Bruce Gordon of I Mother Earth, Gord Sinclair of The Tragically Hip, and the rapper Snow. The album also included a cover of the Tracy Chapman song "Fast Car". A Thai version of the record was released, and included Usher singing in Thai on two of the tracks.

Usher's third solo album, Hallucinations, came out in 2003, and includes a cover of the Manic Street Preachers song "If You Tolerate This Your Children Will Be Next".

Hallucinations was followed by If God Had Curves, which includes collaborations with Tegan Quin of Tegan and Sara, and Bruce Cockburn.

Usher continued to release solo albums throughout the first decade of the 2000s, with Strange Birds (2007) and Wake Up and Say Goodbye (2008). Strange Birds contains themes inspired by New York City, where Usher had moved with his family. It also includes extensive collaborations with other members of Moist. Wake Up and Say Goodbye includes a bonus track featuring Quebec-based singer Marie-Mai, and the album was nominated for a Juno Award.

In the early 2010s, David Usher released two more solo albums before reforming the band Moist. The Mile End Sessions came out in 2010, and Songs from the Last Day on Earth in 2012. The Mile End Sessions is composed mostly of previously released songs re-recorded in acoustic arrangements, is produced by Moist member Jonathan Gallivan, contains Usher's first French-language recording, and features contributions from Marie-Mai and Cœur de pirate. Songs from the Last Day on Earth is also produced by Jonathan Gallivan.

In 2013, Moist returned from a twelve-year hiatus and recorded their fourth studio album, Glory Under Dangerous Skies, the following year.

In 2016, Usher released his ninth solo studio album, titled Let It Play. The album features English translations of French-Canadian songs, re-recorded originals from Usher's repertoire, as well as high-profile collaborations with artists such as Marie-Mai, Alex Nevsky, Monogrenade, Karim Ouellet, Dumas, Ingrid St-Pierre, Caracol, Daniel Lavoie, Dominique A, and Baden Baden.

Throughout his musical career, Usher has sold more than 1.4 million albums, won four Juno Awards and had several #1 singles singing in English, French, and Thai.

Usher is also the founder of Reimagine AI, an artificial intelligence creative studio based out of Montreal. Reimagine AI integrates interactive and AI technology to build virtual beings.

Usher is the co-creator (with Damon Matthews) of the Climate Clock. Climateclock.net

In 2012 Usher made a presentation about the creative process at the Mesh Marketing conference in Toronto. In 2015 he published a book on creativity and the creative process, titled Let the Elephants Run • Unlock Your Creativity and Change Everything.

== Personal life ==
He is featured in the 2001 MuchMusic special Musicians in the WarZone, a humanitarian documentary directed by filmmaker Liz Marshall, in which he journeys to the northern border of Thailand to visit a large Burmese refugee community.

As of 2018, he lives in Montreal, Quebec, with his family.

== Discography ==
=== Studio albums ===
Title	Details	Peak chart positions
Title	Details	CAN
Little Songs	Release date: March 17, 1998; Label: EMI	19
Morning Orbit	Release date: July 31, 2001; Label: EMI	9
Hallucinations	Release date: September 9, 2003; Label: EMI	6
If God Had Curves	Release date: April 26, 2005; Label: EMI	12
Strange Birds	Release date: March 20, 2007; Label: Maple Music	10
Wake Up and Say Goodbye	Release date: September 23, 2008; Label: Maple Music	12
The Mile End Sessions	Release date: September 14, 2010; Label: Maple Music	18
Songs from the Last Day on Earth	Release date: October 2, 2012; Label: Maple Music	
Let It Play	Release date: November 4, 2016; Label: Evil Empire Inc.	
"—" denotes releases that did not chart

=== EPs ===
Title	Details
iTunes Live from Montreal	Release date: January 13, 2009; Label: Evil Empire Inc.

=== Singles ===
Year	Title	Peak Chart Position				Album
Year	Title	CAN	GER	NED	SWI	Album
1998	"Forestfire"	27	—	—	—	Little Songs
1998	"Jesus Was My Girl"	—	—	—	—	Little Songs
1998	"St. Lawrence River"	—	—	—	—	Little Songs
2001	"Alone in the Universe"	7	—	—	—	Morning Orbit
2001	"Black Black Heart"	3	82	87	45	Morning Orbit
2001	"A Day in the Life"	24	—	—	—	Morning Orbit
2002	"My Way Out"	44	—	—	—	Morning Orbit
2003	"Time of Our Lives"	16	—	—	—	Hallucinations
2003	"Surfacing"	—	—	—	—	Hallucinations
2004	"Galaxy"	—	—	—	—	non-album single
2005	"Love Will Save the Day"	—	—	—	—	If God Had Curves
2007	"The Music"	17	—	—	—	Strange Birds
2007	"Ugly is Beautiful"	—	—	—	—	Strange Birds
2008	"Kill the Lights" (featuring Marie-Mai)	—	—	—	—	Wake Up and Say Goodbye
2010	"Je repars" (featuring Marie-Mai)	—	—	—	—	The Mile End Sessions
2010	"I'm Coming Down" (Acoustic)	—	—	—	—	The Mile End Sessions
2024	"Run to the Sea"	—	—	—	—	non-album single

=== with Moist ===
Title	Year
Silver	1994
Creature	1996
Mercedes 5 and Dime	1999
Machine Punch Through: The Singles Collection	2001
Glory Under Dangerous Skies	2014
End of the Ocean	2022

=== Other appearances ===
- "Watching the Wheels" (John Lennon cover) (Instant Karma: The Amnesty International Campaign to Save Darfur, 2007)

=== DVDs ===
- walk.don't.run (2005)
