= Fred St-Gelais =

- Born: Frédéric St-Gelais, September 2, 1974 (age 51); Chibougamau, Quebec, Canada
- Origin: Quebec, Canada
- Genres: Pop, rock, blues
- Occupations: Musician, conductor, producer, arranger, composer, singer, songwriter, instrumentalist
- Instruments: Guitar, bass, keyboard, vocals, drums
- Years active: 1980s – present
- Labels: Sony BMG, Musicor, Maple Music, Orange Record Label
- Website: Official Fred St-Gelais Website

Fred St-Gelais (born Frédéric St-Gelais, on September 2, 1974 in Chibougamau, Quebec) is a Canadian songwriter, television music composer, record producer and multi-instrumentalist, currently living in Montreal, Quebec.

== Biography ==
=== Early work ===
Fred St-Gelais has been immersed in the music industry since he was a teenager. After studying music for several years, both privately where he grew up in the Saguenay/Lac-St-Jean region of the Quebec province, and at the Lionel-Groulx College in the Montreal region, he began his career playing guitar, bass and keyboards, as well as singing in clubs around Quebec in the late 1980s and early 1990s with various local Top 40, rock and blues acts. He decided to build his own studio, where he could work on and fine-tune his production, arranging, and songwriting skills. During this time, he also produced independent albums with local artists, such as Damien Tremblay. During the same time frame, St-Gelais began to receive more and more calls from various jingle and production music producers requesting his services as a studio musician, vocalist and programmer.

=== Move to Montreal and later work ===
St-Gelais moved to Montreal in February 1999. Since then, he has worked with Marie-Mai, Celine Dion, David Usher, Roch Voisine, Randy Bachman, Melissa O'Neil, Rex Goudie, the Canadian Idol television series, Gabrielle Destroismaisons, Andrée Watters, Alain Dumas, Les Mecs Comiques, Annie Villeneuve, Lindsay Robins, Crampe en masse, Réal Béland, and the band Hépatite B, in which he is also the lead singer and guitarist.

=== Music composed for television shows ===
In addition to his work with Canadian Idol, St-Gelais has composed music for the following TV shows:

Ramdam, Kif-Kif, the interstitial program R-Force, Fan Club, Star Academie, Stan et ses Stars, Instant Star, Le club des doigts croisés, Sam Chicotte, and Degrassi: The Next Generation (Season 7, Episode 7 "We Got the Beat").

=== Notable accomplishments, nominations and awards ===
He performed with Sheryl Crow, Sarah McLachlan and Jarah Jane, in addition to serving as Jarah Jane's musical director during the Detroit leg of the 1999 Lilith Fair.

He has twice been featured in Recording magazine.

The band, Hépatite B, in which St-Gelais is the lead singer and guitarist, had their self-titled album nominated for the 2002 best rock album of the year at ADISQ. Three of the album's songs became top 20 hits: "Ton Amour est trop lourd", "Mélanie est partie" and "Je sais, je sais".

St-Gelais, Lindsay Robins and Christopher Ward's song "Time Bomb," was named a finalist in the 2005 International Songwriting Competition (ISC). The ISC received nearly 15,000 entries for the competition, and fewer than 2% of the entries were selected as finalists. Their song was submitted in the "Rock" category.

Along with Marie-Mai, St-Gelais was showcased at the Canadian Songwriters Hall of Fame 3rd Annual Gala, which was held February 5, 2006.

At the ADISQ 30th Annual Gala in 2008, Marie-Mai won a best rock album of the year Felix Award for her album Dangereuse Attraction (Dangerous Attraction in English), which launched in August 2007. St-Gelais cowrote and produced the album, which also became certified gold in August 2008, one year after it debuted.

St-Gelais and Marie-Mai were featured on the cover and in a feature article in the spring 2009 issue of SOCAN's Paroles et Musique magazine. In addition to their music ties, the pair was engaged in 2006 and married in Hawaii in September 2011.

He was nominated for a Juno in 2010 for "Record Producer Of The Year."

In September 2023, he married professional dancer Kim Gingras.

== See also ==
- Marie-Mai's discography
