= Marie-Mai =

Canadian singer

Marie Mai
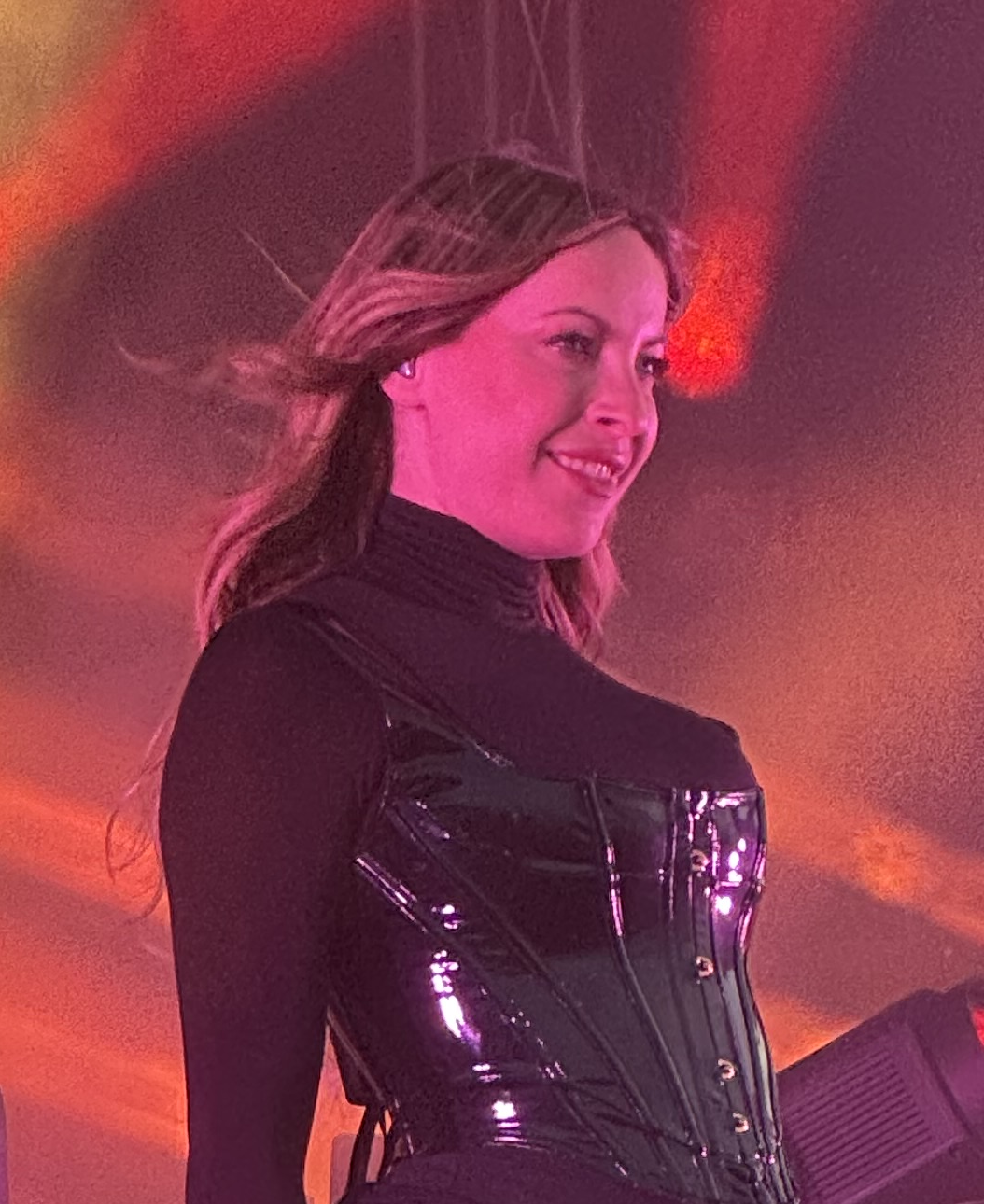
- Marie-Mai performing in July 2025.

Background information
- Also known as: Marie-Mai
- Born: Marie-Mai Bouchard; July 7, 1984 (age 42); Varennes, Quebec, Canada
- Genres: Pop, rock, jazz
- Years active: 2003-present
- Labels: Musicor (2003-2018), Warner Music France, Spectra Musique (2018-present)

Marie-Mai Bouchard (born July 7, 1984) is a Canadian singer from Montreal. She was initially known as one of the finalists of the first season of the Quebec reality show Star Académie.

== Background ==
Marie-Mai was born to an actor father. Marie-Mai began her interest in music in her early years when practicing piano lessons and also participated in musical theatre. Shortly, she began singing and her grandmother noticed her talent. In the following years, she would help Marie-Mai improve her singing abilities even further. At that time, her grandmother suggested to her that she audition for a new competition, Star Académie. Prior to this, in 2001, she would start to perform in shows at Montreal's Théâtre Musical in the Passion intense show.

She became a finalist in the 2003 edition, in which she was immediately noticed by her pop-rock style. She finished third behind Marie-Elaine Thibert, the runner-up of the competition, and Wilfred Le Bouthillier, the eventual winner.

After the Star Académie tour ended in 2004, she was part of the Montreal cast of Jonathan Larson's rock-opera musical Rent, performed at the Olympia Theatre.

In September 2011, she married her producer, Fred St-Gelais, in Hawaii. The couple were engaged since 2006. The pair ended the relationship in early 2016, and later divorced.

In December 2011, Marie-Mai participated in the anti-bullying campaign Ça finit là ("It ends here"), and made a video where she revealed that she had experienced bullying because of her ADHD.

Marie-Mai has been in a relationship with La Voix musical director David Laflèche since 2016, and she gave birth to their daughter on February 15, 2017.

== Career ==
=== Inoxydable (2004-2005) ===
Her debut album Inoxydable, produced by Fred St-Gelais, was released on September 28, 2004. Over 120,000 albums were sold in Quebec (platinum certification) alone while the album was released in France in 2006. Several singles climbed high in the Quebec charts, including the songs "Il faut que tu t'en ailles" and "Encore une Nuit", which reached the top of the Radio Énergie charts. In 2005, she won the prize for best Francophone music video at the MuchMusic Video Awards with "Il faut que tu t'en ailles". In support of her album, Marie-Mai played 87 shows and released a DVD of her concert, La Tournée Inoxydable.

=== Dangereuse attraction (2007-2009) ===
Her second album, Dangereuse attraction, was released on August 28, 2007. In August 2008, Marie-Mai was awarded gold certification for selling over 50,000 copies of this album in Canada. The record was eventually certified platinum.

On June 24, 2009, Marie-Mai featured for the first time in the Quebec National Holiday celebrations in Montreal, simulcast on the Radio-Canada Television and radio. She performed her hits "Mentir" and "Emmène-moi", a cover of the song "Lady Marmalade", and an excerpt of the unofficial national anthem of Quebec, "Gens du pays" by Gilles Vigneault.

On July 1, 2009, during the festivities of Canada Day in Ottawa broadcast on the Radio-Canada and CBC networks, Marie Mai was invited to sing three songs. Originally, the English-language channel broadcast did not include her first song, "Mentir". CBC eventually reversed its decision following the rehearsals and instead decided to broadcast all three songs.

=== Version 3.0 (2009-2011) ===
On September 26, 2009, she released her third album, Version 3.0. She received a third gold record on December 7, 2009, for having sold 40,000 copies of this album. Among her compositions present on the album are "Rebatir notre histoire" and "C'est moi".

On February 28, 2010, she sang "Emmène-moi" at the 2010 Winter Olympics closing ceremony in Vancouver. In the same year, she featured in David Usher's "Je repars". The song stayed in the best positions of the Top 100 Nielsen Broadcast Data Systems chart for over a month.

In 2010 she contributed the song "Your Favourite Killer" to the soundtrack for Yves Simoneau's comedy film The Bait (L'Appât).

In 2011, her album Version 3.0 was certified platinum, with 80,000 copies sold. She also recorded a duet in the same year with Simple Plan for the song "Jet Lag". Later in the same year, she signed with European label and distributor Warner Music France.

=== Miroir (2012-2014) ===
Prior to her fourth album release, on February 22, 2012, she released the song "Sans cri ni haine", a French cover of "Call Your Girlfriend" by Robyn, as a promotional single.

Marie-Mai's official website had undergone major upgrade prior to the album. A countdown to the day of the release of the album was shown. A new logo and the album art of the fourth album were also revealed.

On August 14, 2012, the first official single of the album "C.O.B.R.A." was released to radio stations, along with a 22-second teaser of the music video. As announced by herself on the same date, the new album was to be called "Miroir" and the release date was set to be September 17.

"Miroir" managed to sell 22,000 units during its first week. On October 17, 2012, only a month after the album was released, a press conference was held at the Olympia Theatre in Montreal to announce that the album was certified gold for selling 40,000 copies. This press conference was also used to announce the first 2 dates at the Bell Centre of her brand new tour Tournee Miroir, due to kickoff on January 18, 2013, in Granby, Quebec.

In late 2012, the second single "Jamais ailleurs" was released to Canadian radio stations, while a more acoustic version of the song "Je cours" was chosen as the first single to promote the yet-to-be-released album in France.

Marie-Mai begins 2013 by launching her fourth tour "Tournee Miroir" on January 18 in Granby, QC. The tour will see her perform in front of over 80,000 people across Quebec.

She performed "C.O.B.R.A".", "Jamais ailleurs" and "Heart Attack" during the Canada Day celebrations in Ottawa on July 1, 2013. On July 22, she featured in the benefit concert for the victims of Lac-Mégantic in Lavaltrie, along with 39 other artists.

She began filming a new music video in mid-July. In August 2013, the trailer for the video "Différents" was released, and the full video was available on her YouTube page on September 10, 2013.

She continued her Tournee Miroir tour in September at the Québec Coliseum.

On May 2 and 3, she gave 2 concerts at the Bell Centre and closed her Miroir tour after 100 shows.

=== M (2014-2015) ===
In January 2014, Marie-Mai released "Jamais trop tard", a duet with Jonas, as the first single of her 5th album. The song reached #1 in the radio charts. The recalls of her Bell Centre shows (May 2 and 3) were used to unveil three songs of M: "Conscience", "Tourner", and "À bout portant". On May 12, 2014, M was released with some fireworks around it: 3 new music videos were revealed in the same day: "Conscience", "Tourner", and "Indivisible". Within 2 months, the record received a gold certification for 40,000 copies sold. In July 2014, Marie-Mai's Miroir tour show at the Bell Centre premiered in Quebec cinemas. "Marie-Mai live au Centre Bell : Traverser le Miroir" attracted immediate interest from her fans and was featured in 50 theatres across Quebec. In November 2014, the DVD of the show was launched, and was certified triple platinum for 30,000 copies sold.

=== 2016-present ===
In 2019, Marie-Mai duetted on "The Good Ones" with Canadian country artist Tebey.

In 2023, she participated in an all-star recording of Serena Ryder's single "What I Wouldn't Do", which was released as a charity single to benefit Kids Help Phone's Feel Out Loud campaign for youth mental health. In the same year, she was cast in her first film acting role, in Denys Arcand's forthcoming Testament.

In 2024 she was announced as one of the judges on Quel talent!, the forthcoming Quebec version of the international Got Talent franchise.

In January 2025, Marie-Mai released a new single titled “Pas prévu”, which received radio play in Canada as part of her ongoing musical career..

In May 2025, Marie-Mai’s French version of the song ‘Picture’, performed with Clément Jacques, topped the Canadian francophone radio charts. She was publicly praised by original artist Kid Rock on social media..

In summer 2025, Marie-Mai was a headlining performer at the GibFest music festival in Québec as part of her ongoing live appearances.

== In popular culture ==
- She was the voice actress of Smurfette in the French-Canadian versions of The Smurfs 1 (2011) and 2 (2013).
- During the closing ceremony of the 2010 Vancouver Winter Olympics, she performed Emmène-moi.
- She was a coach on the Quebec version of The Voice (La Voix) alongside Ariane Moffatt, Marc Dupré and Jean-Pierre Ferland.
- In January 2019, Marie-Mai first appeared as a Coach/Mentor on season 2 of Canadian TV network CTV's "The Launch", on the episode that featured Ryan Tedder's song, "Better".
- In 2020, she was announced as the host of the Quebec edition of Big Brother Célebrités, slated to air in 2021 on Noovo.
- In 2021, she appeared in a cellular telephone advertisement, while wearing concert costume and riding a white horse. The punch line was she was breaking up with a customer because his network access was too unreliable.
- In 2024, she guest starred on the Canadian television comedy series Shoresy as a fictionalized version of herself, the owner of a rival hockey team and one of the many Québécois celebrity girlfriends of notorious womanizer character Jean-Jacques François "JJ Frankie JJ" Jacques-Jean.

== Discography ==
- Inoxydable (2004)
- Dangereuse Attraction (2007)
- Version 3.0 (2009)
- Miroir (2012)
- M (2014)
- Elle et moi (2018)
- Sept (2024)

== Dubbing ==
Year	Film	Role	Notes
2011	The Smurfs	Smurfette	French Quebec voice-dub
2013	The Smurfs 2	Smurfette	French Quebec voice-dub

== Awards and nominations ==
Félix Award

- 2008 Rock Album of the Year
- 2010 Rock Album of the Year
- 2010 Best Female Artist of the Year
- 2011 Best Female Artist of the Year
- 2011 Tour of the Year (Singer-Songwriter)
- 2012 Popular Song of the Year « Sans cri, ni haine »
- 2013 Pop Album of the year
- 2013 Best Female Artist of the Year
- 2014 Best Female Artist of the Year

SOCAN Awards

- 2008 SOCAN award for Pop Song - Composer
