= Distribution Select =

Distribution Select (formerly Distribution Musicor, Distribution GAM and Distribution Trans-Canada) was a Canadian music distribution company based in Montréal, Quebec, originally founded in 1965 as Disques Select. It was owned by Quebecor. On December 1, 2018, Outside Music and Distribution Select merged their sales and distribution services, while maintaining their respective offices. On March 16, 2021, Quebecor announced that Distribution Select would cease operations effective July 2 due to declining physical sales; this took effect on that day.

== History ==
- 1965: Company formed as Disques Select.
- 1971: Company moves to Sainte-Catherine Street.
- 1974: Distribution Musicor opens in Pointe-Claire, Quebec. (Unrelated to an American record label, Musicor Records.)
- 1977: Disques Select changes into Distribution Select.
- 1980: Company acquires Services de Musique Trans-Canada.
- 1985: Distribution Select adopts a new logo.
- 1989: Distribution Musicor and Distribution Trans-Canada set up in Pointe-Claire.
- 1993: Distribution Trans-Canada ceases operations.
- 1996: Distribution Musicor joins with Distribution GAM.
- 2001: Distribution Select ceases the activities of Distribution Musicor and Distribution GAM.
- 2018: Distribution Select merges operations with Outside Music.
- 2021: Quebecor announces that Distribution Select will shut down effective July 2, citing declining physical sales; the shutdown takes effect on that day.

== Labels ==
- Disques Passeport
- Global Video
- Perrin Video
- Disques Musicor
- Guy Cloutier Communications

== See also ==
- List of record labels
