= Americana (disambiguation) =

Americana are artifacts of the culture of the United States.

Americana also commonly refers to:

- Americana music, a genre or style of American music

Americana may also refer to:

== Literature ==
- Americana (novel), a 1971 novel by Don DeLillo
- Americana (Sides book), a 2004 non-fiction book by Hampton Sides
- Americanah, a 2013 novel by Chimamanda Ngozi Adichie
- Encyclopedia Americana, an encyclopedia first published in 1829

== Film, radio and television ==
- Americana (game show), a quiz show that aired on NBC from 1947 to 1949
- Americana (1981 film), an American drama film
- Americana, a female professional wrestler who appeared on Gorgeous Ladies of Wrestling circa 1986-1987
- Americana (1992 TV series), a documentary series presented by Jonathan Ross
- Americana (radio series), a 2009-2011 series on BBC Radio 4, reporting current affairs from the United States
- Americana, a 2012 American drama series written by Michael Seitzman
- Americana (2023 film), an American crime thriller film

== Music ==
=== Albums ===
- Americana (Leon Russell album), 1978
- Americana (Michael Martin Murphey album), 1987
- Americana (Starflyer 59 album), 1997
- Americana (The Offspring album), 1998, and also a song from that album
- Americana, a 1999 album by jazz trumpeter Arturo Sandoval
- Americana (Roch Voisine album), a 2008 album by the Canadian singer Roch Voisine
- Americana II a 2009 album by Roch Voisine
- Americana III, a 2010 album by Roch Voisine
- Americana (Neil Young & Crazy Horse album), 2012
- Americana (Modern Mandolin Quartet album), 2012
- Americana (Diesel album), 2016
- Americana (Ray Davies album), 2017

=== Other ===
- Americana (revue), a 1926 Broadway revue written by J. P. McEvoy
- "Americana" (song), 1988 single by Moe Bandy
- Americana (video), a 1998 video album by The Offspring
- "Americana", a 2023 song by the Jonas Brothers' from The Album

== Places ==
=== Brazil ===
- Americana, São Paulo, a city in Brazil

=== United States ===
- Americana Amusement Park, a former name of the defunct LeSourdesville Lake Amusement Park in Monroe, Ohio
- Americana at Brand, an outdoor mall in Glendale, California
- Americana Hotel, a former name of the Sheraton New York Times Square Hotel in New York City, New York
- Americana Manhasset, a shopping center in Manhasset, New York

== Other ==
- Americana de Aviacion, a former Peruvian airline
- Americana Futebol, a football club based in Americana, São Paulo, Brazil
- Americana series, a series of US definitive postage stamps issued between 1975 and 1981
- Armlock § Top shoulder lock, an armlock in grappling also known as "americana"
- Americana Group, a multinational food company and franchise operator based in Kuwait
- Americana, a fictional TV network on which Daphne Blake's series Coast To Coast with Daphne Blake aired in the direct-to-video animated film Scooby-Doo on Zombie Island

== See also ==
- Miss Americana, 2020 documentary about singer-songwriter Taylor Swift, directed by Lana Wilson
- Americain (disambiguation)
- American (disambiguation)
- Americano (disambiguation)
- Americanum
- Americanus (disambiguation)
- Ameraucana
