= Marc Hamilton =

Canadian singer (1944–2022)

Background information
- Born: 2 February 1944; Matane, Quebec, Canada
- Died: 17 February 2022 (aged 78) Saint-Jérôme, Quebec, Canada
- Genres: Pop
- Occupation: Singer
- Years active: 1963–2022

Marc Hamilton (2 February 1944 – 17 February 2022) was a Canadian singer best known for his 1970 single "Comme j'ai toujours envie d'aimer".

== Beginnings ==
In 1963, at the age of 19, and the height of The Beatles' success of the sixties, and the popularity of the Beatle-inspired francophone bands of the sixties, Hamilton formed the four-member Les Shadols, writing six original songs released on three consecutive singles.

In 1965, he launched his band Les Monstres. As a solo release, he found some success with his single "Je n'apprendrai pas le violon". In 1969, he joined with his Shadol bandmate Normand Bouchard with two singles "Nous avons marché" and "J'irai un jour à Paris".

== Solo career ==
Hamilton is best known for his 1970 single "Comme j'ai toujours envie d'aimer" that was a big hit in Quebec and in France where it reached number 1 on the French Singles Chart on 12 September 1970 staying on top of the French chart for three consecutive weeks. It was also number 1 in Belgium, number 2 in Switzerland and reached number 14 in the Dutch chart. The single was subject to further covers by Jean-François Michaël in 1970, musical covers by Grand orchestre de Paul Mauriat and by Georges Jouvin, and an English-language cover entitled "Time" by Canadian singer Marty Butler. Later covers included notably one by Roch Voisine in 1993 and another by Mitsou in 1994. In 2003, the song was crowned in a list of "Grands Classiques de la chanson québécoise" (Great classics of Quebec songs) by SOCAN. The SODRAC (Société du Droit de Reproduction des Auteurs, Compositeurs et Éditeurs au Canada) considered it as a great song of Quebec. For commemoration of the 50th anniversary of the Quebec flag, it was picked as one of all-time 50 Quebec songs ever. It was also honored by Quebec Culture Minister Line Beauchamp and by la Fondation de la SPAC. On 27 January 2007, it was entered into the Canadian Songwriters Hall of Fame.

As a follow-up on the fame of "Comme j'ai toujours envie d'aimer", Hamilton also released the single "Tapis magique". In the early 1970s, he released three albums, the self-titled Marc Hamilton in 1970, Comme j'ai toujours envie d'aimer also in 1970 containing his famous song as the title track and Au fond des choses in 1972.

In 1973, as a result of an accident, he lost his left eye, but persevered in musical projects notably programming for the activities of Grand salon de Mascouche. In the early 1980s, he had some success with various releases including the single "Peau de femmes". He released three albums in this period, Peau de femmes (1981), J'ai un bon deal (1984) a musical comedy directed on stage by Roger Pilon and J'ai un rendez-vous d'amour (1987)

He also published an autobiography titled La chanson qui m'a tué. As a producer, he has worked with a number of artists and in films. He directed the Orchestre de l'Opéra national de Paris. In the late 1980s, he opened a musical bar Le Soph. In 2003 he released an album of covers titled Marc Hamilton chante Aznavour in tribute of the French singer Charles Aznavour.

In 2007, the trio JohnE-5 made up of Jonathan Gauthier (a.k.a. JohnE) as lead vocals and Yannick Brosseau (a.k.a. Yann So) and Charles Dauphin (a.k.a. Carlito) as musicians released a tribute album to Hamilton interpreting many of his songs under the album title Comment ça va Marc Hamilton. It was inspired by Hamilton's autobiographical book and first presented at the Francouvertes 2007.

== Personal life ==
In 1973, as a result of an accident, Hamilton lost his left eye, but he persevered in musical projects.

In October 2003, he attempted suicide trying to jump through his 11th storey apartment, but was stopped by his wife. The press reported that the singer had alcoholism and dependency on prescription medication and extreme bouts of anxiety and suicidal tendencies. He was transferred to the psychiatric ward of Saint-Luc hospital for recuperation.

He was active in charity, founding Maison Marc Hamilton in Mauricie, Quebec.

=== Death ===
On 1 February 2022, Hamilton fell into a coma after contracting COVID-19. He died at a hospital in Saint-Jérôme on 17 February 2022, at the age of 78 during the COVID-19 pandemic in Quebec.

== Discography ==
=== Albums ===
- Marc Hamilton (1970)
- Comme j'ai toujours envie d'aimer (1970)
- Au fond des choses (1972)
- Peau de femmes (1981)
- J'ai un bon deal (1984)
- J'ai un rendez-vous d'amour (1987)
- Malgré les murs (1996)
- Rétrospective (1996)
- Marc Hamilton chante Aznavour (2003)

=== Singles ===
Year	Song	Peak positions					Album
Year	Song	BEL (Vl)	CAN	FR	NED	SWI	Album
1970	"Comme j'ai toujours envie d'aimer"	1	-	1	14	2	Comme j'ai toujours envie d'aimer
1972	"Dans La Vie"	-	2	-	-	-	Photo Journal Rend Hommage À Mlle Québec
1972	"Viens"	-	6	-	-	-	Disque D'Or

== Publications ==
- La chanson qui m'a tué (2005)
