= Roch Voisine (2001 album) =

Studio album by Roch Voisine
- Released: 2001; In 2 versions Canadian version European version
- Recorded: April–August 2001
- Studio: Le Divan Vert, Montréal; Studio Piccolo, Montréal; Studio Victor, Montréal
- Genre: Pop, rock
- Label: RCA, RV International
- Producer: Christophe Battaglia; J. Kapler; Marc Pérusse; Roch Voisine

Roch Voisine chronology
Christmas Is Calling (2000)	Roch Voisine (2001)	Higher (2002)

Roch Voisine is a 2001 album of Canadian singer Roch Voisine. It is also known as Éponyme (self-titled)

It was released in 2 versions:

- Canadian Version: 1 CD (containing 13 songs)
- European Version: 1 CD (containing 14 songs)

== Track listing ==
=== Canadian Version of Roch Voisine ===
No.	Title	Writer(s)	Producer(s)	Length
1.	"Le cowboy virtuel" (Virtual Cowboys)	Helen Boulding, Ken Rose, Roch Voisine, Luc de Larochellière (French)		4:25
2.	"Dis-lui"	J. Kapler, Frédéric Kocourek	Christophe Battaglia, J. Kapler	3:37
3.	"Elle est ma tendresse"	Jean-Paul Dréau		4:43
4.	"Demande à la poussière"	Élisabeth Anaïs, Daniel Lavoie		4:04
5.	"L’irrésistible" (Closer Than Skin)	Rose, Voisine, Francine Raymond (French)		3:43
6.	"J’attends"	Rose, Voisine, Lambert (French)		4:24
7.	"Un océan de peine"	Kapler	Battaglia, Kapler	3:17
8.	"Un parfum d’éternité"	Patrick Hampartzoumian, Julien Melville		4:15
9.	"Tu t’en iras"	Sam Brewski	Battaglia, Kapler	3:52
10.	"Julia"	Kapler	Battaglia, Kapler	4:02
11.	"Ce soir mon ange"	Yannick Guérin		3:43
12.	"Les baisers faciles"	Ali Thomson, Voisine, Raymond (French)		3:21
13.	"Kibera"	Kapler, Kocourek, Voisine		4:53

=== European Version of Roch Voisine ===
No.	Title	Writer(s)	Producer(s)	Length
1.	"Dis-lui"	J. Kapler, Frédéric Kocourek	Christophe Battaglia, J. Kapler	3:37
2.	"Le cowboy virtuel" (Virtual Cowboys)	Helen Boulding, Ken Rose, Roch Voisine, Luc de Larochellière (French)		4:25
3.	"Elle est ma tendresse"	Jean-Paul Dréau		4:43
4.	"Demande à la poussière"	Élisabeth Anaïs, Daniel Lavoie		4:04
5.	"L’irrésistible" (Closer Than Skin)	Rose, Voisine, Francine Raymond (French)		3:43
6.	"J’attends"	Rose, Voisine, Lambert (French)		4:24
7.	"Ce qu'il me reste" (Undeniable)	Todd Chapman, Robert Ellis Orrall, Shelly Peiken, Yannick Guérin (French)		3:11
8.	"Un océan de peine"	Kapler	Battaglia, Kapler	3:17
9.	"Un parfum d’éternité"	Patrick Hampartzoumian, Julien Melville		4:15
10.	"Tu t’en iras"	Sam Brewski	Battaglia, Kapler	3:52
11.	"Julia"	Kapler	Battaglia, Kapler	4:02
12.	"Ce soir mon ange"	Guérin		3:43
13.	"Les baisers faciles"	Ali Thomson, Voisine, Raymond (French)		3:21
14.	"Kibera"	Kapler, Kocourek, Voisine		4:53
