= Le Noël de Roch Voisine =

Studio album by Roch Voisine
- Released: 9 November 2004
- Recorded: 2004
- Genre: Christmas songs
- Length: 46:35
- Label: RV International

Roch Voisine chronology
Je te serai fidèle (2003)	Le Noël de Roch Voisine (2004)	Sauf si l'amour... (2005)

Le Noël de Roch (CD + DVD)
- Alternative CD + DVD cover

Le Noël de Roch Voisine is a 2004 Christmas album of the Canadian singer Roch Voisine.

The album was released initially as Le Noël de Roch Voisine in November 2004 containing 12 tracks. It was also made available on RV International label on a joint CD and DVD package on 9 November 2004 under the amended title Le Noël de Roch dropping Voisine from the title.

== Track list ==
1. "Joyeux Noël" (3:12)
2. "Marie-Noël" (3:31)
3. "L'enfant au tambour" (4:14)
4. "Au royaume du bonhomme Hiver" (2:26)
5. "Promenade en traîneau" (2:53)
6. "Noël blanc" (3:40)
7. "Petit Papa Noël" (4:15)
8. "Sainte Nuit" (3:54)
9. "Mon beau sapin" (3:43)
10. "Minuit chrétiens" (5:21)
11. "23 décembre" (4:39)
12. "Noël du campeur" (4:47)

== Charts ==
Chart (2004)	Peak position
Belgian Albums (Ultratop Wallonia)	62
French Albums (SNEP)	63
