= Avant de partir (song) =

1990 single by Roch Voisine

Single by Roch Voisine

from the album Hélène
- B-side: "Instrumental"
- Released: 1990
- Recorded: 1989
- Genre: Pop
- Length: 3:08
- Label: Productions Georges Mary
- Songwriters: Germain Gauthier, Yvan Décary
- Producer: Roch Voisine

Roch Voisine singles chronology
"Pourtant" (1990)	"Avant de partir" (1990)	"La Berceuse du petit diable" (1990)

"Avant de partir" is a 1989 pop song recorded by Canadian singer Roch Voisine. It was released in July 1990 as the third and last single from his first studio album Hélène, on which it appears as the fourth track. It became a top ten hit in France.

== Versions ==
"Avant de partir" was performed during Voisine's 1992 tour and thus included on the live albums Europe Tour and Roch Voisine Live, as well as on the compilation Best Of. Voisine recorded a new version of "Avant de partir" first in 2003 on his album Je te serai fidèle, then in 2013 as a duet with Véronic DiCaire, on his album Duophonique. Jonathan Hamard of Charts in France considered this cover version with DiCaire as one of the most well-made duets from Voisine's album.

== Chart performance ==
In France, "Avant de partir" debuted at number 31 on the chart edition of 28 July 1990, had a peak at number seven in its seventh week, and remained for a total of six weeks in the top ten and 21 weeks in the top 50, dropping from the chart straight from number 28. It achieved Silver status, awarded by the Syndicat National de l'Édition Phonographique. On the European Hot 100 Singles, it debuted at number 54 on 18 August 1990, reached a peak of number 34 five weeks later, and fell off the top 100 after 19 weeks of presence.

== Track listings ==
- 12" maxi
1. "Avant de partir" (new version) – 3:08
2. "Là-bas dans l'ombre" – 3:36
3. "Avant de partir" (instrumental) – 3:08
- 7" single
1. "Avant de partir" (new version) – 3:08
2. "Avant de partir" (instrumental) – 3:08
- CD maxi
1. "Avant de partir" (new version) – 3:08
2. "Là-bas dans l'ombre" – 3:36
3. "Avant de partir" (instrumental) – 3:08

== Charts ==
=== Weekly charts ===
Chart (1990)	Peak position
Europe (European Hot 100)	34
France (SNEP)	7
Quebec (ADISQ)	12

=== Certifications ===
Certifications for "Avant de partir"
Region	Certification	Certified units/sales
France (SNEP)	Silver	200,000^{*}
^{*} Sales figures based on certification alone.

== Release history ==
Country	Date	Format	Label
Europe	1990	CD maxi	Productions Georges Mary
Europe	1990	7" single	Productions Georges Mary
Europe	1990	12" maxi	Productions Georges Mary
