= Coup de tête (disambiguation) =

Coup de tête is a 1979 French film by Jean-Jacques Annaud (English title Hothead).

The word generally means headbutt and may also refer to:

- Coup de tête (album), a 1994 album by Roch Voisine
- Coup de tête (sculpture), a sculpture by Adel Abdessemed, which depicts the infamous headbutt by French footballer Zinedine Zidane
