= Europe Tour =

Live album by Roch Voisine
- Released: October 1992
- Recorded: 1992 at : Studio Voyageur 2; Studio Victor
- Genre: Pop; rock

Roch Voisine chronology
Roch Voisine (1990)	Europe Tour (1992)	I'll Always Be There (1993)

Singles from Europe Tour
- 1. "La légende Oochigeas" Released: 1992

Europe Tour is a 1992 album by Canadian singer Roch Voisine containing some of his best live performances in Europe with 22 of his hits, 18 in French and 4 in English. The album was successful on the chart.

In France, the album spawned a sole single : "La légende Oochigeas", which was released in live version and hit number four on the singles chart and remained in the top 50 for 20 weeks.

Europe Tour debuted at #15 on 21 October 1992 on the SNEP Albums Chart and had a peak at number two seven weeks later. It totaled ten weeks in the top ten and 20 weeks in the top 50. In 1993, the album was certified Platinum disc for over 300,000 copies sold.

== Track listing ==
English language songs marked with **

=== Disc 1 ===
1. Ouverture IV" (instrumental) — 2:06
2. Là-bas dans l'ombre" (Voisine, Lefèvre / Katz) — 2:07
3. Fille de pluie" (Voisine, Huet / Voisine) — 1:26
4. Ton blues" (Voisine, Marc Voisine, Lefèvre / Sperenza) — 2:18
5. La promesse" (Lefebvre, Voisine) — 2:41
6. All Wired Up" ** (Voisine) — 4:06
7. Prélude" — 1:19
8. Les Jardins de St-Martin (Princesse)" (Voisine) — 3:19
9. Souviens-toi" (Voisine) — 3:31
10. La légende Oochigeas" (Voisine, Campbell) — 6:16
11. Until Death Do Us Part" ** (Francis Cabrel, Campbell, Voisine) — 3:38
12. Avec tes yeux pretty face" (Voisine) — 3:32
13. L'idole" (Voisine) — 4:19

=== Disc 2 ===
1. "La Berceuse du petit diable" (Decary, Voisine) — 4:34
2. "Waiting" ** (Voisine) — 3:32
3. "Darlin'" (Ciciola, Decary, Izzo, Voisine) — 4:19
4. "Avant de partir" (Décarie / Gauthier) — 2:54
5. "On the Outside" ** (Campbell, Voisine) — 4:44
6. "Pourtant" (Voisine, Lefèvre / Voisine) — 7:21
7. "Hélène" (Voisine, Lessard / Voisine) — 6:24
8. "Tous les soirs c'est Saturday" (Voisine / Voisine, Price) — 6:11
9. "Bye Bye" (Lefebcre, Voisine, Vollant) — 4:55

== Personnel ==
- Paul Vincent - management
- Marc Beaulieu - musical director, vocals
- Peter Barbeau - drums
- Kevin De Souza - bass
- Rejean Lachance - guitar
- Christian Peloquin, James Campbell - guitar, vocals
- Claude Castonguay - keyboards
- Paul Picard - percussion
- Deborah Cox, Luce Duffault, Kim Richardson - vocals
- Michael Delaney - mixing
- René Weis, Luc Pellerin, Jean Massicott, Bill Kinal - mixing assistants
- Nuit de Chine - design
- François Darmigny / Sygma - photos
- Roch Voisine, André Di Cesare - producer
