= Roch Voisine Live =

Live album by Roch Voisine
- Released: 2006
- Recorded: 2006
- Label: RCA Victor Europe

Roch Voisine Live (full title Roch Voisine Live - Intime/Intimate) is a 2006 live bilingual double album, the first in French and the second in English by Canadian singer Roch Voisine. It contains 34 songs of Roch Voisine performed live, including some of his best songs and singles and some favourite album tracks from his repertoire.

== Track listing ==
=== CD 1 ===
1. "Hélène" (ballad)
2. "Laisse-la rêver"
3. "Oochigeas"
4. "La Berceuse du petit diable"
5. "Ce soir mon ange"
6. "Le poème de chair"
7. "My Lady mio segreto"
8. "Pourtant"
9. "Ne m'oublies pas"
10. "Darlin'"
11. "Délivre-moi"
12. "Je l'ai vu"
13. "Jean Johnny Jean"
14. "Avec tes yeux Pretty Face"
15. "Avant de partir"
16. "Tant pis"
17. "Hélène"(rock)

=== CD 2 ===
1. "Kissing Rain"
2. "Oochigeas"
3. "St. Annie Of The Wild Blue Eyes"
4. "Am I Wrong"
5. "Virtual Cowboys"
6. "Wind and Tears"
7. "Tears in My Coffee"
8. "Shout Out Loud"
9. "Pretty Face"
10. "Stay"
11. "Myriam's Song"
12. "Don't Give Up"
13. "Higher"
14. "With These Eyes"
15. "There's No Easy Way"
16. "By Myself"
17. "Deliver Me"
18. "I'll Always Be There"
