= Deep Kiss =

Deep Kiss may refer to:

- French kiss, an expression of affection
- Deep Kiss (manhwa), a Korean manhwa by Hwang Mi Ri
- "Deep Kiss", a song by Mitsou
