= Comme j'ai toujours envie d'aimer =

Song by Marc Hamilton

"Comme j'ai toujours envie d'aimer" is a 1970 French-language single by Canadian singer Marc Hamilton. It reached number 1 on the French Singles Chart on 12 September 1970 staying on top of the chart for three consecutive weeks. It was also number 1 in Belgium and reached number 2 in Switzerland and number 14 in the Dutch chart.

The same year, it was a hit again for French singer Jean-François Michaël in two versions, in French and in an Italian version as "Più di ieri".

== Accolades ==
In 2003, the song was crowned in a list of "Grands Classiques de la chanson québécoise" (Great classics of Quebec songs) by Society of Composers, Authors and Music Publishers of Canada (SOCAN). Société du Droit de Reproduction des Auteurs, Compositeurs et Éditeurs au Canada (SODRAC) considered the song as a great song of Quebec.

For commemoration of the 50th anniversary of the Quebec flag, the song was picked as one of all-time 50 Quebec songs ever. It was also honored by Quebec Culture Minister Line Beauchamp and by la Fondation de la SPAC. On 27 January 2007, it was entered into the Canadian Songwriters Hall of Fame.

== Covers ==
With the huge popularity of the song, French orchestra leader and conductor Paul Mauriat issued an all-musical version of the song in a 1970 album also titled Comme j'ai toujours envie d'aimer credited to Grand orchestre de Paul Mauriat. Another orchestral rendition was made by Georges Jouvin.

The song has been interpreted by dozens of artists and in instrumental versions by renowned orchestras. Notable covers include that of Canadian singer Roch Voisine in the 1993 album Chaque feu.... Although the track didn't appear in the main album releases for 1-CD Canada and European releases, it was included in the 2-CD Special Edition for Canada of the album as one of 6 additional bonus tracks.

In 1994, French Canadian singer Mitsou recorded an up-beat version in a track in her 1994 album Ya Ya that included cover versions of songs popular in Quebec in the 1960s and 1970s. The single release was accompanied by a music video for the song. The music video won MuchMusic Video Award for Best French Video in 1995.

In 2001, the Belgian singers Bart Kaëll and Vanessa Chinitor revived the song with a new version as the duo Bart & Vanessa. The track was included in their 2001 album Costa Romantica.

=== Language versions ===
The song has been translated and interpreted in at least 15 languages. An English-language version was released by Canadian singer Marty Butler as "Time". Ivica Tomović released a Serbo-Croat version under the title "Koliko sam Često Želio da te volim" and it was interpreted in Dutch by Hanny-D titled "Jij leerde mij hoe liefde smaakt".

== In popular culture ==
The song was used in the 1993 film La Florida where it was performed by Michael Sarrazin aka Romeo Laflamme.

== Charts ==
In France in 1970 the original by Marc Hamilton reached number 1 on the singles sales chart compiled by the Centre d'Information et de Documentation du Disque (CIDD).

=== Weekly positions ===
Chart (1970–1971)	Peak position
France (CIDD)	1
Belgium (Ultratop 50 Flanders)	1
Netherlands (Dutch Top 40)	14
Switzerland (Schweizer Hitparade)	2

== See also ==
- List of number-one singles of 1970 (France)
