= Américain =

Américain is the French language word for American.

Americain, Américain, Americaine(s), Americains, or variant, may refer to:

- Americain (racehorse) (2005-2022), the racehorse
- Americaine, brand name for the drug Benzocaine
- Sauce américaine, the sauce
- Café Americain, an American sitcom starring Valerie Bertinelli
- Hotel Americain, in Amsterdam, Netherlands

== See also ==
- Americanum
- Americanus (disambiguation)
- Americana (disambiguation)
- Americano (disambiguation)
- American (disambiguation)
