= Confidences =

Studio album by Roch Voisine
- Released: 2010
- Recorded: 2010
- Genre: Pop rock
- Length: 42:29

Roch Voisine chronology
Americana III (2010)	Confidences (2010)	Duophonique (2013)

Singles from Confidences
- 1. "Décembre" Released: 2010

Confidences is a 2010 French language album by Canadian singer Roch Voisine. It includes the single, "Décembre". It was released in Canada on September 4, 2012 with re-ordered track list, some song substitutions, and alternate versions of "D'Amérique" (new musical arrangements and lyrics adapted for Canadians) and "Libre" (new musical arrangements).

A Special Edition was also released in Canada on the same day, restoring 2 of the dropped tracks from the European edition ("Ma blonde" and "Danser sous la lune") and adding a radio version of "Le Chemin" (previously released on the European "Best Of" album) and the new track "Chuis pas un rocker".

== Track listing ==
European edition
No.	Title	Writer(s)	Length
1.	"D'Amérique"	Daniel Barbe, Roch Voisine, Jeff Smallwood, Denis Richard	4:19
2.	"Le Grand Pommier"	Jean-François Breau, Denis Richard	4:10
3.	"Décembre"	Roch Voisine, Jean-François Breau, Nelson Minville	3:54
4.	"Belle comme un rêve"	Roch Voisine, Jean-François Breau, Nelson Minville	3:23
5.	"Libre"	Roch Voisine, Christopher Ward, Denis Richard	3:32
6.	"Les P'tits Loups"	Roch Voisine, Jean-François Breau	4:26
7.	"Prends ton temps"	Roch Voisine, Bill Ghiglione, Léa Ivanne	3:57
8.	"Ma blonde"	Xavier Druot, Roch Voisine, Léa Ivanne	3:24
9.	"Danser sous la lune"	Roch Voisine, Christopher Ward, John Barlow Jarvis, Steve Marin	3:38
10.	"J'écrirai tout"	Roch Voisine, Jean-François Breau, Nelson Minville	3:49
11.	"Attends toi au meilleur"	Anika Paris, Dean Landon, Léa Ivanne	4:00

Canadian edition
No.	Title	Writer(s)	Length
1.	"D'Amérique"	Daniel Barbe, Roch Voisine, Jeff Smallwood, Denis Richard	4:21
2.	"Montréal-Québec"	Daniel Barbe, Roch Voisine, Jeff Smallwood, Denis Richard	4:01
3.	"Belle comme un rêve"	Roch Voisine, Jean-François Breau, Nelson Minville	3:23
4.	"Décembre"	Roch Voisine, Jean-François Breau, Nelson Minville	3:54
5.	"Les P'tits Loups"	Roch Voisine, Jean-François Breau	4:26
6.	"Libre"	Roch Voisine, Christopher Ward, Denis Richard	3:41
7.	"Prends ton temps"	Roch Voisine, Bill Ghiglione, Léa Ivanne	3:57
8.	"Le Grand Pommier"	Jean-François Breau, Denis Richard	4:10
9.	"J'écrirai tout"	Roch Voisine, Jean-François Breau, Nelson Minville	3:49
10.	"Le Chemin"	Roch Voisine, Claude Pineault, Éric Maheu	14:09

Canadian Special edition
No.	Title	Writer(s)	Length
1.	"D'Amérique"	Daniel Barbe, Roch Voisine, Jeff Smallwood, Denis Richard	4:21
2.	"Montréal-Québec"	Daniel Barbe, Roch Voisine, Jeff Smallwood, Denis Richard	4:01
3.	"Belle comme un rêve"	Roch Voisine, Jean-François Breau, Nelson Minville	3:23
4.	"Décembre"	Roch Voisine, Jean-François Breau, Nelson Minville	3:54
5.	"Les P'tits Loups"	Roch Voisine, Jean-François Breau	4:26
6.	"Libre"	Roch Voisine, Christopher Ward, Denis Richard	3:41
7.	"Prends ton temps"	Roch Voisine, Bill Ghiglione, Léa Ivanne	3:57
8.	"Le Grand Pommier"	Jean-François Breau, Denis Richard	4:10
9.	"J'écrirai tout"	Roch Voisine, Jean-François Breau, Nelson Minville	3:49
10.	"Le Chemin"	Roch Voisine, Claude Pineault, Éric Maheu	14:09
11.	"Ma blonde (bonus)"	Xavier Druot, Roch Voisine, Léa Ivanne	3:24
12.	"Danser sous la lune (bonus)"	Roch Voisine, Christopher Ward, John Barlow Jarvis, Steve Marin	3:38
13.	"Le Chemin (version radio - bonus)"	Roch Voisine, Claude Pineault, Éric Maheu	4:26
14.	"Chuis pas un rocker (bonus)"	Roch Voisine, Claude Pineault, Éric Maheu	5:47

== Chart performance ==
Chart (2012)	Peak position
Canadian Albums Chart	3
