= Duophonique =

Compilation album by Roch Voisine with Various Artists
- Released: 25 February 2013
- Recorded: 2012
- Genre: Pop rock
- Label: Jive Epic (Europe); RV International (Canada)

Roch Voisine chronology
Confidences (2010)	Duophonique (2013)

Singles from Duophonique
- 1. "Hélène" Released: February 2012

Duophonique is a compilation album of famous songs by Canadian singer Roch Voisine in French performed as duos with other artists with all new, and often symphonic orchestra arrangements. It was released on 25 February 2013 containing 13 tracks, 11 of which are duo interpretations of well-known Roch Voisine songs, and one original song called "Montréal-Québec" done in two versions, one as a duo with Marilou and another as a solo pop version. The pop version was previously released on the Canadian edition of Confidences.

The Canadian edition was released on 29 October 2013 containing 12 tracks. Some of the tracks are as performed on the European edition, while others are performed with different artists. The order of tracks differs from the European edition, and track 12 ("Pourtant") was not featured on the European edition.

== Track listing ==
European edition
No.	Title	Length
1.	"Hélène (with Cœur de pirate)"	3:24
2.	"Et si... (with Elisa Tovati)"	3:39
3.	"La Berceuse du petit diable (with Isabelle Boulay)"	4:06
4.	"Je resterai là (with Patrick Fiori)"	3:36
5.	"L'Idole (solo)"	4:08
6.	"Avant de partir (with Véronic DiCaire)"	3:48
7.	"Montréal-Québec (with Marilou)"	4:52
8.	"Tant pis (with Patricia Kaas)"	3:54
9.	"La Légende Oochigeas (with Lynda Lemay)"	5:49
10.	"Laisse-la rêver (with Julie Zenatti)"	3:08
11.	"Je te serai fidèle (with Chimène Badi)"	4:21
12.	"Darlin' (with Montreal All-Star Choir)"	4:41
13.	"Montréal-Québec (pop version)"	4:06

Canadian edition
No.	Title	Length
1.	"Je resterai là (with Jean-François Breau and Boom Desjardins)"	3:35
2.	"Et si... (with Maurane)"	3:39
3.	"Hélène (with Cœur de pirate)"	3:25
4.	"La Berceuse du petit diable (with Isabelle Boulay)"	4:04
5.	"La Légende Oochigeas (with Lynda Lemay)"	5:49
6.	"L'Idole (with Patrick Norman)"	4:09
7.	"Darlin' (with Montreal All-Star Choir)"	4:39
8.	"Laisse-la rêver (with Florence K)"	3:08
9.	"Avant de partir (with Véronic DiCaire)"	3:48
10.	"Je te serai fidèle (with Chimène Badi)"	4:21
11.	"Tant pis (with Patricia Kaas)"	3:55
12.	"Pourtant (with Robert Marien)"	5:03

== Charts ==
Chart (2013)	Peak position
Canadian Albums (Billboard)	12
Ultratop 40 Belgian Albums Charts (Wallonia)	6
SNEP French Albums Chart	9
