= D. americana =

D. americana may refer to:

- Dasyatis americana, the southern stingray, a stingray species found in tropical and subtropical waters of the southern Atlantic Ocean, Caribbean Sea and Gulf of Mexico
- Diarrhena americana, the American beak grass or American beakgrain, a native, perennial grass species of North America

== See also ==
- Americana (disambiguation)
