= B. americanus =

B. americanus may refer to:

- Berthellina americanus, a snail species
- Bos americanus, a mammal species
- Bufo americanus, a toad species

== See also ==
- Americanus (disambiguation)
