= Pourtant =

1990 single by Roch Voisine

Single by Roch Voisine

from the album Hélène
- B-side: "Instrumental"
- Released: 1990
- Recorded: 1989
- Genre: Ballad, pop
- Length: 5:40
- Label: Productions Georges Mary
- Songwriters: Roch Voisine, Marcel Lefèvre
- Producer: Roch Voisine

Roch Voisine singles chronology
"Hélène" (1989)	"Pourtant" (1990)	"Avant de partir" (1990)

"Pourtant" is a 1989 pop-ballad song recorded by Canadian singer Roch Voisine. It was released in March 1990 as the second single from his first studio album Hélène, on which it appears as the third track. It became a top three hit in France.

== Versions ==
"Pourtant" was performed during Voisine's 1992 tour and thus included on the live albums Europe Tour and Roch Voisine Live, as well as on the compilation Best Of. Voisine recorded a new version of "Pourtant" first in 2003 on his album Je te serai fidèle, then in 2013 as a duet with Robert Marien, on the Canadian edition of his album Duophonique.

== Chart performance ==
In France, "Pourtant" debuted at number 17 on the chart edition of 7 April 1991, then entered the top ten two weeks later, had a peak at number three in its sixth week, and remained for a total of eight weeks in the top ten and 14 weeks in the top 50. It achieved Silver status, awarded by the Syndicat National de l'Édition Phonographique. On the European Hot 100 Singles, it debuted at number 61 on 21 April 1991, reached a peak of number 13 in the sixth week, and fell off the top 100 after 13 weeks of presence.

== Track listings ==
- 12" maxi
1. "Pourtant" – 5:40
2. "Hélène" (English version) – 3:45
3. "Pour une victoire" – 3:02
- 7" single
1. "Pourtant" – 5:40
2. "Pourtant" (instrumental) – 4:22
- CD maxi
1. "Pourtant" – 5:40
2. "Pour une victoire" – 3:02
3. "Pourtant" (instrumental) – 4:22

== Charts ==
=== Weekly charts ===
Chart (1990)	Peak position
Europe (European Hot 100)	13
France (SNEP)	3
Quebec (ADISQ)	27

=== Year-end charts ===
Chart (1990)	Position
Europe (Eurochart Hot 100)	98

=== Certifications ===
Certifications for "Pourtant"
Region	Certification	Certified units/sales
France (SNEP)	Silver	200,000^{*}
^{*} Sales figures based on certification alone.

== Release history ==
Country	Date	Format	Label
Europe	1990	CD maxi	Productions Georges Mary
Europe	1990	7" single	Productions Georges Mary
Europe	1990	12" maxi	Productions Georges Mary
