= La Berceuse du petit diable =

1990 single by Roch Voisine

Single by Roch Voisine

from the album Double
- B-side: "Instrumental"
- Released: November 1990
- Recorded: 1990
- Genre: Ballad, pop
- Length: 4:04
- Label: Productions Georges Mary
- Songwriters: Roch Voisine, Yvan Décary
- Producers: Roch Voisine, André Di Cesare

Roch Voisine singles chronology
"Avant de partir" (1990)	"La Berceuse du petit diable" (1990)	"Darlin'" (1991)

"La Berceuse du petit diable'" is a 1990 pop-ballad song recorded by Canadian singer Roch Voisine. It was released in November 1990 as the lead single from his second studio album Double, on which it appears as the tenth track. It became a top ten hit in France and Belgium (Wallonia).

== Versions ==
"La Berceuse du petit diable" was performed during Voisine's 1992 tour and thus included on the live albums Europe Tour and Roch Voisine Live, as well as on the compilation Best Of. Voisine recorded a new version of "La Berceuse du petit diable" first in 2003 on his album Je te serai fidèle, then in 2013 as a duet with Isabelle Boulay, on his album Duophonique. Jonathan Hamard of Charts in France considered this cover version as one of the two duets from Voisine's album that one would gladly listen again, as both singers' voices go very well together.

== Chart performance ==
In France, "La Berceuse du petit diable" debuted at number 49 on the chart edition of 17 November 1990, then performed the biggest jump of the week, gaining 29 positions to reach number 20, entered the top ten in its fourth week and reached its highest position, number three, in its ninth week, then dropped and fell off the top 50 straight from number 30, after spending nine weeks in the top ten and 18 on the chart. It achieved Silver status, awarded by the Syndicat National de l'Édition Phonographique. In Belgium (Wallonia), it featured for four weeks in the top ten, with a peak at number six on 19 and 26 January 1991. On the European Hot 100 Singles, it debuted at number 82 on 8 December 1990, reached a peak of number 13 in the seventh week, and fell off the top 100 after 15 weeks of presence.

== Track listings ==
- CD maxi
1. "La Berceuse du petit diable" – 4:04
2. "La Berceuse du petit diable" (instrumental) – 4:04
3. "Hélène" – 3:45
- 12" maxi
1. "La Berceuse du petit diable" – 4:04
2. "La Berceuse du petit diable" (instrumental) – 4:04
3. "Hélène" – 3:45
- 7" single – Europe
1. "La Berceuse du petit diable" – 4:04
2. "La Berceuse du petit diable" (instrumental) – 4:04
- 7" single – Canada
1. "La Berceuse du petit diable" – 4:05

== Charts ==
=== Weekly charts ===
Chart (1990–1991)	Peak position
Belgium (Ultratop 50 Wallonia)	6
Europe (European Airplay Top 50)	48
Europe (European Hot 100)	13
France (SNEP)	3
Quebec (ADISQ)	6

=== Certifications ===
Certifications for "La Berceuse du petit diable"
Region	Certification	Certified units/sales
France (SNEP)	Silver	125,000^{*}
^{*} Sales figures based on certification alone.

== Release history ==
Country	Date	Format	Label
Europe	1990	CD maxi	Productions Georges Mary
Europe	1990	12" maxi	Productions Georges Mary
Europe	1990	7" single	Productions Georges Mary
Canada	1990	7" single	Star Records
