= Tant pis =

Single by Roch Voisine

from the album Je te serai fidèle
- B-side: "My Lady Mio Segreto"
- Released: February 2004
- Recorded: 2003
- Genre: Pop
- Length: 3:52
- Label: BMG
- Songwriters: Claudio Guidetti, Léa Ivanne

Roch Voisine singles chronology
"Julia" (2002)	"Tant pis" (2004)	"Je l'ai vu" (2004)

"Tant pis" is a song recorded by Canadian singer Roch Voisine. Written by Claudio Guidetti, Léa Ivanne, it was the lead single from his album Je te serai fidèle (2003), and was released first as CD maxi in February 2004, then as CD single in July of the same year. The song was successful in France where it became a top ten hit. In the subsequent years, Voisine recorded new versions of the song.

== Chart performance ==
"Tant pis" marked the singer's return in the top ten hit of the French Singles Chart since his 1992 single "La légende Oochigeas". Then released as a CD maxi, it debuted at number 12 on the chart edition of 15 February 2004, climbed in the top ten the next week, peaked at number eight in the fourth week, then regularly dropped until felling off the top 100 after 19 weeks. However, it reentered the chart after the release of the CD single in July 2004, reaching again the top 20, and eventually spent a total of 38 weeks on the chart, which remained the singer's longest single chart trajectory in France. On 8 December 2004, it earned a Silver disc for selling over 125,000 units. In Belgium (Wallonia), it entered the Ultratop 50 on 6 March 2004 at number 39, reached number 33 and left the chart after tree weeks. In Switzerland, it entered at a peak of number 75 on 14 March 2004 and remained for nine weeks in the top 100.

== Cover versions ==
In 2005, Voisine performed the song on the show Star Academy 4 with contestant and future winner Grégory Lemarchal. In February 2006, a version recorded with 500 choristers was released as B-side of Voisine's first single from his then new album Sauf si l'amour.... Later, the original version of the song was included on Voisine's best of Roch, released in May 2007, on which it appears as the 16th track. In 2013, Voisine released an acoustic version of the song, a duet with Patricia Kaas and the Prague Philharmonic Orchestra, which features on his album Duophonique. About the album, Jonathan Hamard of Charts in France said that he was "less enthusiastic" when listening "Tant pis" although he noticed that the song is quite different since "new arrangements [...] convey a lot of emotions".

== Track listings ==
- CD single
1. "Tant pis" — 3:49
2. "My Lady Mio Segreto" — 4:20
- CD maxi
1. "Tant pis" — 3:49
2. "Hélène" — 3:46
3. "Darlin'" — 4:31
- Digital download
1. "Tant pis" — 3:49
2. "Tant pis" (duet with Patricia Kaas) — 3:54
3. "Tant pis" (with 500 choristers) — 4:01

== Charts ==
=== Weekly charts ===
Chart (2004)	Peak position
Belgium (Ultratop 50 Wallonia)	33
France (SNEP)	8
Switzerland (Schweizer Hitparade)	75

=== Year-end charts ===
Chart (2004)	Position
French Singles Chart	25

=== Sales ===
Country	Certification	Sales
France	Silver	125,000
