= Laurence Nerbonne =

Canadian pop singer from Quebec

- Laurence Nerbonne 2026

Background information
- Born: 24 March 1985 (age 41); Gatineau, Quebec, Canada
- Genres: Pop, electropop musique francophone
- Occupations: Singer, singer-songwriter, composer, producer, visual artist
- Label: Musicor
- Website: http://www.laurencenerbonne.com

Laurence Nerbonne (born 24 March 1985) is a Canadian pop singer and artist from Quebec based in Montreal.

== Life and career ==
Originally from Gatineau, Quebec, Nerbonne performed with the band Hôtel Morphée before releasing XO, her debut album, in 2016.

She won the Juno Award for Francophone Album of the Year at the Juno Awards of 2017 for her album XO.

In addition to her Juno Award win, she won the 2016 SOCAN Songwriting Prize in the French-language division for the song "Rêves d’été".

In 2022, her music was used in the theatrical film Niagara.

In 2023, Nerbonne collaborated with Mitsou on "Cowgirl", a song which contained lyrical allusions to Mitsou's 1988 hit "Bye Bye Mon Cowboy".

Nerbonne as an artist, uses acrylics and primarily focusing on the human face. Nerbonne states "the face carries the mark of the soul that it hides."

She began painting at the age of sixteen and has since developed a distinctive visual language combining figurative portraiture, fashion imagery and symbols of popular culture. Through bold compositions and highly detailed surfaces, her work examines the pressure to consume, perform and conform while portraying women who resist these expectations with confidence, irony and vulnerability.

Over the course of her career, Nerbonne has built an international collector base, with works held in private collections around the world. Her work has been exhibited in Montreal and Toronto and is currently represented by Thompson Landry Gallery in Toronto. Based in Montreal, she continues to develop her practice while expanding her work internationally.
