= Adieu jolie Candy =

French song written by Alain Boublil and Michel Hursel

- 1969 French maxi single cover

Single by Jean-François Michaël

from the album Adieu jolie Candy
- Language: French
- B-side: "Francine (Les Newstars)"
- Released: August 1969
- Length: 2:52
- Label: Disques Vogue
- Songwriters: Alain Boublil, Michel Hursel, Raymond Jeannot

"Adieu jolie Candy" is a French song written by Alain Boublil and Michel Hursel (the latter a pseudonym of Michel Berger, and music was composed by Raymond Jeannot. It became a successful single for Jean-François Michael (stage name of singer Yves Rose) in 1969 and was released on the Barclay Records label.

It was a hit in France and internationally for Jean-François Michael topping both the French and the Belgian singles charts. The song was the title track of the similarly titled Michael album Adieu jolie Candy.

== Track listing ==
1. "Adieu jolie Candy" (2:52)
2. "Francine (Les Newstars)" (3:10)

== Covers ==
Besides the main French-language version, Jean-François Michael released alternative language versions under various titles as "Adiós, linda Candy" in Spanish, "Adios querida luna" also in Spanish, "Fiori bianchi per te" in Italian and "Adieu süsse Candy" in German.

=== "Fiori bianchi per te" ===
An Italian language version of the song titled Fiori bianchi per te (White flowers for you) became a hit for the Combos in 1970 (Combo Record – HP 8070) and Milords, contained in 1987 album Amore, ti ricordi... 3 (Love, do you remember ... 3) (Andros Music, MC 3310).

=== "If That's All I Can" ===
An English language version of the song titled "If That's All I Can" became a minor hit in 1974 for Bobby Vinton in the Benelux reaching number 29 on the Belgian Ultratop 30 and number 18 on the Dutch Top 40.
