= Americana (Roch Voisine album) =

Studio album by Roch Voisine
- Released: 2008
- Recorded: 2008
- Genre: Rock; pop; country
- Label: RCA Victor Europe

Roch Voisine chronology
Best Of (2007)	Americana (2008)	AmerIIcana (2009)

Americana is a 2008 album by Canadian singer Roch Voisine. Many of the tracks were recorded in Nashville, Tennessee.

He followed that in 2009 with the album AmerIIcana.

== Track listing ==
Bonus bilingual English / French version tracks marked with [*]

1. "City of New Orleans"
2. "Ring of Fire"
3. "Let It Be Me"
4. "Lay Lady Lay"
5. "Crazy"
6. "Suspicious Minds"
7. "You Never Can Tell"
8. "And I Love You So"
9. "Always on My Mind"
10. "Ode to Billy Joe"
11. "I Will Always Love You"
12. "City of New Orleans" / Salut les amoureux [*]
13. "Let It Be Me" / Je t'appartiens [*]
14. "Ode to Billy Joe" / La Marie-Jeanne [*]

== Charts ==
=== Weekly charts ===
Chart (2008–2010)	Peak position
Belgian Albums (Ultratop Wallonia)	9
Canadian Albums (Billboard)	1
French Albums (SNEP)	3
Swiss Albums (Schweizer Hitparade)	22

=== Year-end charts ===
Chart (2008)	Position
Belgian Albums (Ultratop Wallonia)	97
French Albums (SNEP)	69

Chart (2009)	Position
French Albums (SNEP)	182

Chart (2010)	Position
Canadian Albums (Billboard)	33

== See also ==
- Americana II
- Americana III
