= Double (Roch Voisine album) =

Studio album by Roch Voisine
- Released: 1990
- Recorded: 1990, Recording : at Studio Intersession and Studio Victor, Montréal, and Studio Palais des Congrès, Paris; Mixing at Le Studio Palais des Congrès, Paris
- Genre: Pop
- Label: BMG Ariola

Roch Voisine chronology
Hélène (1989)	Double (1990)	Roch Voisine (1990)

Singles from Double
- 1. "La Berceuse du petit diable" Released: 1990; 2. "Darlin'" Released: 1991; 3. "La promesse" Released: 1992; 4. "Avec tes yeux (Pretty Face)" Released: 1992

Double is a 1990 bilingual French / English double album by Canadian singer Roch Voisine as a follow-up to the album Hélène. The first CD is all in French, the second all in English. The English tracks were also released as a separate album entitled Roch Voisine.

== Album information ==
The album was recorded in Canada and France, and was mixed in France. Famous singer-songwriter and guitarist Francis Cabrel participated in one of the tracks of the second album.

In France, the album spawned three top three singles : "La berceuse du petit diable" (#3), "Darlin'" (#2), and later "La promesse" (#3) and "Avec tes yeux (Pretty Face)" (#3). The last two singles were released to support Voisine's live album Europe tour, but originally appears on this album.

Double debuted at #4 on 6 December 1990 on the SNEP Albums Chart and had a peak at number two for two weeks. It totaled 26 weeks in the top ten and 73 weeks in the top 50. In 1992, the album earned a 2 x Platinum disc for over 600,000 copies sold.

== Track listing ==
=== Disc 1 : French ===
1. "Prélude" (Beaulieu) — 1:51
2. "Les Jardins de St-Martin (Princesse)" (Voisine) — 3:07
3. "La promesse" (Lefebvre, Voisine) — 2:28
4. "Elle a peur des hirondelles" (Campbell, Lefebvre, Lessard, Voisine) — 3:48
5. "Tu ne sauras jamais" (Lefebvre, Voisine) — 3:59
6. "Darlin'" (Ciciola, Decary, Izzo, Voisine) — 4:15
7. "Au bout de l'île" (Lefebvre, Voisine) — 2:59
8. "Pour toi" (Albert, Bourquin, Gasté) — 5:03
9. "Blue Love Sue" (Decary, Voisine) — 3:02
10. "La Berceuse du petit diable" (Little Devil's Lullaby) (Decary, Voisine) — 4:03
11. "Bye-Bye" (Lefebvre, Voisine, Vollant) — 4:06

=== Disc 2 : English ===
1. "On the Outside" (Campbell, Voisine) — 4:03
2. "Waiting" (Voisine) — 3:28
3. "Mountain Girl" (Lessard, Voisine) — 3:37
4. "A Fishing Day" (Voisine) — 4:09
5. "My Fairy Tale" (Campbell, Voisine) — 2:58
6. "She Had a Dream" (Voisine) — 3:32
7. "Until Death Do Us Part" (Francis Cabrel, Campbell, Voisine) — 3:17
8. "Jamie's Girl" (Campbell, Voisine) — 2:25
9. "Pretty Face" (Voisine) — 3:16
10. "Helen" (English version) (Lessard, Voisine) — 3:43
11. "All Wired Up" (Voisine) — 4:00

== Personnel ==
Musicians

- Backing vocals - Adessa, Sembele Assitan, Bobby Helms, Bruce L. Johnson, Carole Frédericks, Elise Duguay (tracks: 2.02), Georges Costa, James Campbell, Janiece Jamison, Kat Dyson, Kathleen Dyson, Kim Richardson, Norman Groulx, Richard Groulx, Roch Voisine
- Bass - Allan B. Abrahams, Bernard Paganotti, Denis Labrosse, Pierre Duchesne, Sylvain Bolduc
- Cello - Alain Aubut
- Drums - Denis Toupin, Dominique Messier, Peter Barbeau, Richard Provençal
- Guitar - Christian Leroux, Carl Katz, Christian Péloquin, Denis Forcier, Denis Lable, Francis Cabrel, James Campbell, Jean-Marie Benoit, Michael Pucci, Patrice Tison, Rick Haworth, Roch Voisine, Réjean Bouchard, Réjean Lachance
- Keyboards - Aldo Nova, Luc Gilbert, Marc Beaulieu
- Percussion - Denis Benarrosh, Denis Toupin, Marc Chantereau, Paul Picard
- Piano - Marc Beaulieu, Scott Price
- Strings - Bernard Paganotti, Bertrand Lajudie, Marc Beaulieu, La Philharmonie de Paris, Le Quatuor de la Philharmonie de Paris
- Viola - Gérard Daigle
- Violin - Christian Prévost, Stéphane Allard

Recording and photo

- Engineer - Philippe Laffont (strings, vocals and background vocals recording), Claude Pons (vocals and background vocals recording)
- Mixing - Manuel "Manu" Guiot, Serge "Bum-Bum" Pauchard
- Mixing assistant - Bruno Sourice
- Recording - Gaétan Pilon, Michael Delaney
- Recording assistant - Christophe Jauseau, Luc Pellerin, Stanislas BC
- Arranged by Aldo Nova, Bernard Paganotti, Francis Cabrel, Jean-Marie Benoit, Luc Gilbert, Marc Beaulieu, Roch Voisine, Scott Price
- Photo - Tony Frank
- Producer - André Di Cesare, Roch Voisine
