= Americano =

Americano may refer to:

== Drinks ==
- Caffè americano, a style of coffee prepared by adding hot water to espresso
- Americano (apéritif), a variety of apéritif
- Americano (cocktail), a cocktail composed of Campari, sweet vermouth, and club soda

== Arts and entertainment ==
=== Films ===
- The Americano (1916 film), directed byJohn Emerson
- The Americano (1955 film), directed by William Castle
- Americano (2005 film)
- Americano (2011 film)
- El Americano: The Movie, a 2016 film

=== Music ===
- "Americano" (song), a 2011 song by Lady Gaga
- "The Americano", instrumental single by Xavier Cugat, 1954
- "Americano", a cover of the Renato Carosone song "Tu vuò fà l'americano" by The Brian Setzer Orchestra from the album Vavoom!
- ¡Americano!, a 2004 album by Roger Clyne and the Peacemakers
- "Americanos" (song), a 1989 song by Holly Johnson

=== Theatre ===
- ¡Americano! (musical), a 2020 musical

== Places ==
- Americano Creek, a river in Sonoma County, California, US
- Rancho Estero Americano, a Mexican land grant in Sonoma County, California, US

== Sports ==
- Americano Futebol Clube, a Brazilian football (soccer) club from Campos dos Goytacazes, Rio de Janeiro
- Americano Futebol Clube (MA), a Brazilian football club in Bacabal, Maranhão.
- Sport Club Americano, a defunct Brazilian football (soccer) club from Santos, São Paulo
- Sport Club Americano (Porto Alegre), a defunct Brazilian football (soccer) club from Porto Alegre, Rio Grande do Sul

== See also ==
- Fútbol Americano, marketing name used for the first National Football League (NFL) regular season game held outside the US
- Americanum
- Americanus (disambiguation)
- Americana (disambiguation)
- Americain (disambiguation)
- American (disambiguation)
