= Roch Voisine (1990 album) =

Studio album by Roch Voisine
- Released: 1990
- Recorded: 1990
- Genre: Pop
- Label: BMG Ariola
- Producer: André Di Cesare, Roch Voisine

Roch Voisine chronology
Hélène (1990)	Roch Voisine (1990)	Europe Tour (1992)

Singles from Roch Voisine
- 1. "On the Outside" Released: 1991; 2. "Waiting" Released: 1991

Roch Voisine (also known as On the Outside as per the first track on the album) is a 1990 album by Canadian singer Roch Voisine. It has the same content as the English tracks of his bilingual French / English double album entitled Double released the same year. It provided two singles in France, which achieved moderate success in comparison with the singer's previous singles : "On the Outside" (#10) and "Waiting" (#16).

Its chart performances and certifications were probably merged to the singer's previous album, Double, as its content is partially the same as that of the double album. Therefore, the album debuted at #4 on 6 December 1990 on the SNEP Albums Chart and had a peak at number two for two weeks. It totaled 26 weeks in the top ten and 73 weeks in the top 50. In 1992, the album earned a 2 x Platinum disc for over 600,000 copies sold.

== Track listing ==
1. "On the Outside" (Campbell, Voisine) — 4:03
2. "Waiting" (Voisine) — 3:28
3. "Mountain Girl" (Lessard, Voisine) — 3:37
4. "A Fishing Day" (Voisine) — 4:09
5. "My Fairy Tale" (Campbell, Voisine) — 2:58
6. "She Had a Dream" (Voisine) — 3:32
7. "Until Death Do Us Part" (Francis Cabrel, Campbell, Voisine) — 3:17
8. "Jamie's Girl" (Campbell, Voisine) — 2:25
9. "Pretty Face" (Voisine) — 3:16
10. "Helen" (English version) (Lessard, Voisine) — 3:43
11. "All Wired Up" (Voisine) — 4:00

== Personnel ==
- Pastelle - artwork
- Manuel "Manu" Guiot, Serge "Bum-Bum" Pauchard - mixing
- Bruno Sourice - assistant mixing
- Paul Vincent - management
- Tony Frank - photo
- André Di Cesare, Roch Voisine - producer
- Michael Delaney - recording
- Christophe Jauseau, Luc Pellerin, Stanislas BC - assistant recording
- Philippe Laffont - strings recording
- Claude Pons, Philippe Laffont - vocals and backing vocals recording
