= Coupable (song) =

1973 song by Jean-François Michael

"Coupable" (French for 'Guilty') is a 1973 song and hit single by French singer Jean-François Michael, composed by the Rahbani brothers with lyrics by Yves Dessca. It is the French-language version of a Levantine Arabic song originally recorded by Lebanese artist Fairuz in 1970, titled "Habbaytak Bessayf" (حبيتك بالصيف, 'I Loved You in the Summer').

In 2024, during her blind audition on La Voix au Québec, Jana Salameh performed the song in both languages, highlighting the connection between the original Levantine Arabic version and its French adaptation.
