= Bye Bye Mon Cowboy =

Single by Mitsou

from the album El Mundo
- Released: 1988
- Recorded: 1988
- Genre: Pop
- Label: ISBA
- Songwriter: J.P. Isaac
- Producers: Pierre Gendron and J.P. Isaac

Mitsou singles chronology
| "Bye Bye Mon Cowboy" (1988) | "Les Chinois" (1989) |

"Bye Bye Mon Cowboy" was the debut single from French-speaking Canadian pop star Mitsou in 1988 from her first album El Mundo.

While the lyrics were in French, it did contain several English words or words that could be easily understood by both an anglophone and a francophone audience: "bye bye", "cowboy", "gigolo", "rodeo".

The song's theme concerns a woman ending her relationship with her "cowboy" even though he makes love like a god when she wants it. ("Tu fais l'amour comme un dieu et tu le fais quand je le veux".) She gets hot when he approaches her but she can tell by his look there are other women in his life. ("Quand tu m'approches je deviens chaude mais! /Ton regard il y'en a d'autres o-o".) This makes her angry and she tells him she is tired of playing games—it's better to leave now than never . ("Rien ne va plus les jeux sont faits c'est le temps d'mettre un arrêt / C'est difficile de te quitter mais vaut mieux maintenant que jamais é-é.") The singer ends the song with the refrain: "Bye bye mon cowboy, bye bye mon rodéo / C'est si dur de tomber si bas quand t'as été si haut." ("Bye bye my cowboy, bye bye my rodeo / It's hard to fall so low when you've been so high".)

== Chart performance ==
Unusually for a French language song, "Bye Bye Mon Cowboy" was a significant breakout hit in English Canada as well as Quebec; it gained airplay on English-language radio in 1989, and peaked at #63 in the RPM100 in July.

== Remixes ==
The song was later given a house music remix by Shep Pettibone and re-released in 1989 and for the US market in 1990 with a new video. The new video featured higher production values and included shots of Mitsou, dressed in a tight black dress, running about a city with shopping bags. These scenes were interspersed with scenes shot on a studio set made to look like a barn. Several muscular cowboys danced about her as she sang the song.

The song was subsequently re-recorded and remixed in 2002 for her club-oriented EP Vibe. It was released again as a single and received airplay in Québec.

Men Without Hats performed the song live with Mitsou on 7 September 1990, on the first show of their Sideways tour.

== Follow-up ==
Mitsou followed up the cowboy and western theme with the country-tinged ballad "Lettre à un cowboy" (1991) (on which she sings to a cowboy "je t'ai dit bye bye", which translates as "I said bye bye to you") as well as the EP and title track Heading West (1992).

In 2023, she collaborated with Laurence Nerbonne on "Cowgirl", a new song which again alluded to "Bye Bye Mon Cowboy" with a lyric asserting that "bye bye, j'ai pas besoin d'un cowboy" ("bye bye, I don't need a cowboy").
