= L'album de Noël =

Studio album by Roch Voisine
- Released: 2000 in two versions: Canadian and European
- Recorded: 2000

L'album de Noël is a 2000 French language Christmas album by Canadian singer Roch Voisine. He simultaneously released an English language Christmas album entitled Christmas Is Calling.

The album was released in two versions:

- Canadian version - contains 14 songs (all in French)
- European version - contains 14 songs (3 in English)

== Track listing ==
=== Canadian version of L'Album de Noël ===
1. Joyeux Noël
2. Marie-Noël
3. L'enfant au tambour
4. Au royaume du Bonhomme Hiver
5. Promenade en traineau
6. Noël blanc
7. Petit Papa Noël
8. Sainte nuit
9. Mon beau sapin
10. Minuit Chrétiens
11. 23 décembre
12. Noël du campeur - 25 juillet

=== European version of L'Album de Noël ===
1. Joyeux Noël
2. Marie-Noël
3. L’enfant au tambour
4. Au royaume du Bonhomme hiver
5. Happy Christmas
6. Promenade en traîneau
7. Noël blanc
8. Petit Papa Noël
9. Christmas Is Calling
10. Sainte Nuit
11. Mon beau sapin
12. Minuit Chrétiens
13. I'll Be Home For Christmas
14. Un simple gars
