= Hélène (album) =

Studio album by Roch Voisine
- Released: November 1989
- Recorded: 1989, at studio Victor
- Genre: Pop
- Label: Les Disques Star

Roch Voisine chronology
Roch Voisine (1987)	Hélène (1989)	Double (1990)

Singles from Hélène
- 1. "Hélène" Released: 1989; 2. "Pourtant" Released: 1990; 3. "Avant de partir" Released: 1990

Hélène is a 1989 album by Canadian singer Roch Voisine. The title track "Hélène" is his best selling international single, reaching number one for nine weeks on the French Singles Chart. Other successful singles from the album include "Pourtant" (#3) and "Avant de partir" (#7), released in 1990 summer.

Two songs were both written and composed by the singer himself. Marc Voisine, his brother, participated in the writing of the last track. The recording and mixing were made at the Victor studio, except for the song "Hélène" (at Intercession studio).

The album debuted at number 14 on 3 December 1989 on the SNEP Albums Chart and had a peak at number one for two weeks almost eleven months after. It totaled 40 weeks in the top ten and 113 weeks in the top 50. In 1991, the album achieved Diamond status for over one million copies sold. In Norway, the album entered the albums chart in February 1990 and stayed for six weeks in the top 20, with a peak at number nine. In Canada, the album achieved double platinum in 1989 and triple platinum in 1992.

== Track listing ==
1. "Hélène" (Voisine, Lessard / Voisine) — 3:42
2. "Là-bas dans l'ombre" (Voisine, Lefèvre / Katz) — 4:19
3. "Pourtant" (Voisine, Lefèvre / Voisine) — 5:47
4. "Avant de partir" (Décarie / Gauthier) — 3:08
5. "L'Idole" (Voisine) — 4:11
6. "Fille de pluie" (My Calgary Flirt) (Voisine, Huet / Voisine) — 3:37
7. "Souviens-toi" (Voisine) — 4:53
8. "Pour une victoire" (Voisine, Lefèvre / Voisine) — 2:53
9. "Tous les soirs, c'est Saturday" (Voisine / Voisine, Price) — 3:33
10. "Ton blues" (Voisine, Marc Voisine, Lefèvre / Sperenza) — 3:27

== Personnel ==
- André Di Cesare – artistic direction
- Luc Gilbert – production, arrangements, keyboards, drum programming (track 1)
- Scott Price – arrangements (except tracks 1–3), synthesizers, piano, synthesizers programming
- Carl Katz – guitars (track 1)
- Michael Pucci, Robert (Bob) Stanley – guitars
- Sylvain Bolduc – bass
- Richard Provençal – drums
- Louise Lemire, Élise Duguay, Estelle Esse, Richard Groulx – backup vocals
- Andy Scott, Michel Delaney – engineers
- Jean Blais (front cover), Lyne Charlebois, Michel Tremblay (back cover) – photos
- Steeve Daviault – hair, make-up
- Bill Kinal, Josée Simard – assistants

== Charts ==
1990 chart performance for Hélène
Chart (1990)	Peak position
French Albums (SNEP)	1
Norwegian Albums (VG-lista)	9

2024 chart performance for Hélène
Chart (2024)	Peak position
Belgian Albums (Ultratop Wallonia)	26
