= Chaque feu... =

Chaque feu

Compilation album by Roch Voisine
- Released: In 1999 in 3 versions Canadian version European version Special Edition – Canada
- Genre: Pop, rock

Chaque feu is a 1999 album of Canadian singer Roch Voisine.

It was released in 3 versions:

- Canadian Version: 1 CD (containing 14 songs)
- European Version: 1 CD (containing 14 songs)
- Special Edition for Canada: 2 CD's (containing 14 songs and 6 bonus songs)

== Track listing ==
=== Canadian Version of Chaque feu... ===
1. Je resterai là
2. Au bout de la piste
3. Juste pour soi
4. Doucement
5. La seconde chance
6. J'ai l'espoir
7. Un simple gars
8. Juste un peu de temps
9. Obia
10. Mourir les sirènes
11. Les lys blancs
12. Avant vous
13. Chaque feu
14. Et si...

=== European Version of Chaque feu... ===
1. Comme...
2. Je resterai là
3. Au bout de la piste
4. Juste pour soi
5. Doucement
6. La seconde chance
7. J'ai l'espoir
8. Un simple gars
9. Mourir les sirènes (new version)
10. Les lys blancs
11. Avant vous
12. Chaque feu
13. Obia
14. Et si...

=== Special Edition – Canada of Chaque feu... ===
1. Je resterai là
2. Au bout de la piste
3. Juste pour soi
4. Doucement
5. La seconde chance
6. J'ai l'espoir
7. Un simple gars
8. Juste un peu de temps
9. Obia
10. Mourir les sirènes
11. Les lys blancs
12. Avant vous
13. Chaque feu
14. Et si...

Bonus:

1. Comme
2. Par cœur
3. S'aimer sans lumière
4. Les amants
5. S'aimer
6. Comme j'ai toujours envie d'aimer
