= Mitsou =

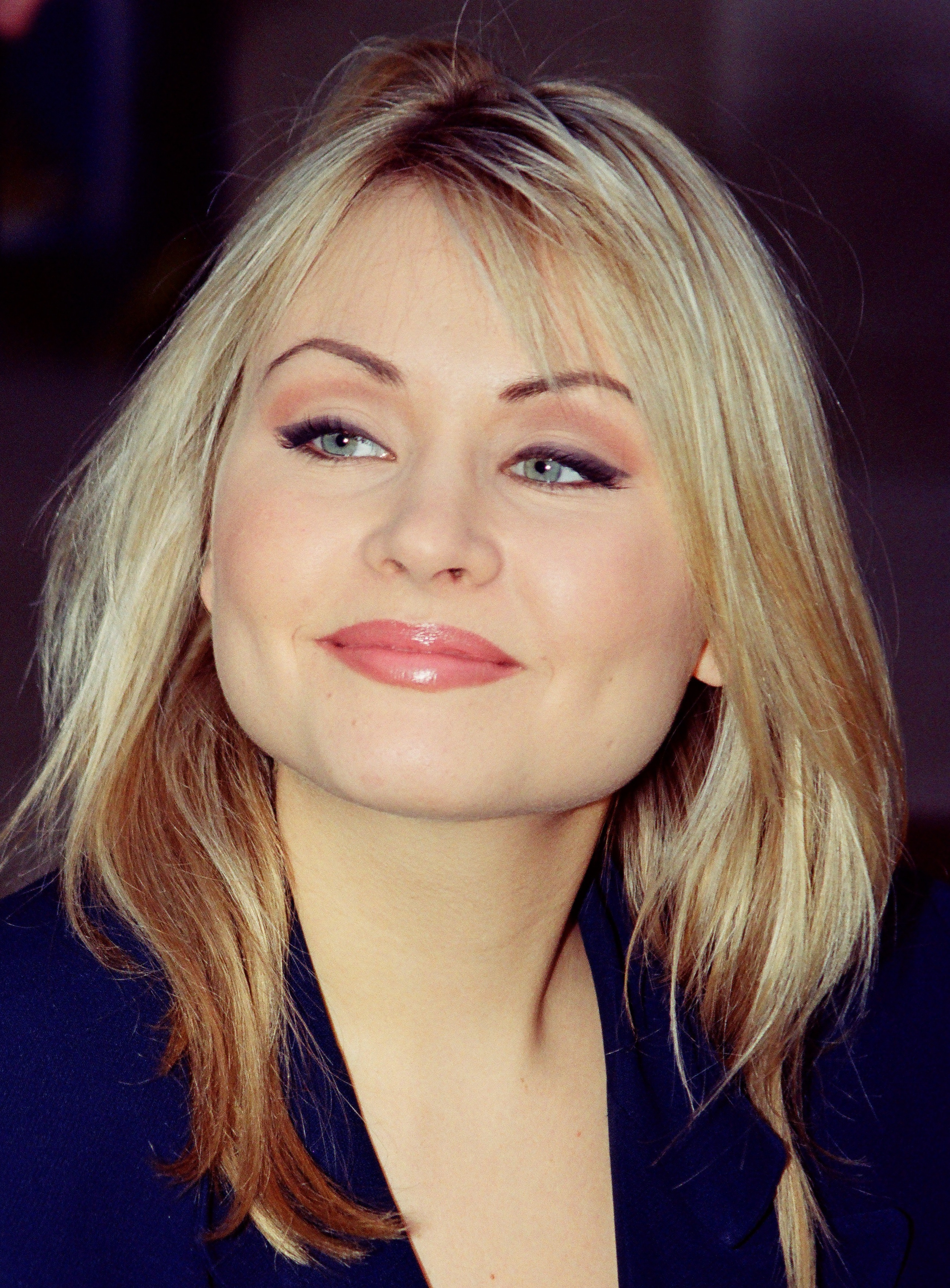
- Mitsou in December 1993

Background information
- Born: Mitsou Annie Marie Gélinas; September 1, 1970 (age 55); Loretteville, Quebec, Canada
- Genres: Synth-Pop, House, New Wave, Rock
- Occupations: Singer, actress, businesswoman, television and radio presenter
- Years active: 1988–present
- Labels: Isba, Sony BMG
- Website: / mitsoumagazine.com

Mitsou Annie Marie Gélinas (born September 1, 1970, in Loretteville, Quebec) is a Canadian pop singer, businesswoman, television and radio host, and actress. She is credited as Mitsou Gélinas when acting, but records simply as Mitsou.

== Background ==
Born in Loretteville, Quebec, Mitsou is the granddaughter of Quebec actor and playwright Gratien Gélinas. Her younger sister, Abeille Gélinas, has also been an actress and television host.

She got involved in acting and modelling as a child, notably in the French-Canadian soap opera Terre humaine, but also began to pursue singing in her teenage years.

== Career ==
=== Early career ===
In 1988, she signed with Canadian independent Isba Records and released her first single, "Bye Bye Mon Cowboy" (composed and produced by Jean-Pierre Isaac), which became a pop hit across Canada, an extremely rare feat for a francophone song, in 1989. Later that year, she followed with her debut, multicultural-themed album, El Mundo which also spawned the singles "La Corrida" and "Les Chinois".

She received her first Juno Award nomination, for Most Promising Female Vocalist, at the Juno Awards of 1990.

=== Terre des hommes and "Dis-moi, dis-moi" ===
Later in 1990, she released her follow-up album, Terre des hommes. Ivan Doroschuk of Men Without Hats wrote the title track, in addition to her first English-language song "A Funny Place (The World Is)". The first single, "Mademoiselle Anne", featured Mitsou dressed as a man in the video. In 1991, the second single, "Dis-moi, dis-moi", put Mitsou back in the spotlight with a controversial video that showed her and several male and female models nude in a shower room, as well as a scene where she kissed her own reflection in a mirror.

The video, which was released only a few months after Madonna's "Justify My Love", was banned from regular rotation by MuchMusic as the Madonna video had been – technically, the video was not fully banned from the network, as the programming committee ruled that the late-night program City Limits was allowed to play it, but as a mainstream pop song incompatible with the show's alternative rock format, the program refused to do so.

Notably, the video for "Dis-moi, dis-moi" was not banned on Much's French-language sister station MusiquePlus, but in fact was placed in heavy rotation; Mitsou's manager Pierre Gendron attributed the difference to English Canada being more prudish than French Canada. Ottawa Citizen journalist Jay Stone additionally highlighted the absurdity of the situation by noting that since MusiquePlus was carried in the parts of the city served by Skyline Cable, but not in the parts served by Maclean-Hunter, that meant that a viewer's ability to see the video on television in Ottawa depended solely on whether they lived east or west of Bank Street.

Having banned two high-profile pop videos within a few months of each other, MuchMusic created a new occasional late-night series, Too Much 4 Much, on which they would play banned videos along with forum and panel discussions on the controversies these videos raised. Due to the controversy, Mitsou's single again garnered radio airplay across Canada despite being in French.

In fall 1991, Mitsou faced some controversy when she declined to attend that year's Félix Award ceremonies, despite receiving a nomination for Best Pop-Rock Show, due to Gendron's opposition to ADISQ's $640 annual membership fee. Roch Voisine also later refused to attend the ceremony, claiming that the organization didn't serve the interests of Quebec musicians.

At the Juno Awards of 1992, Mitsou was nominated for Best Female Vocalist, and Alain DesRochers was nominated for Best Music Video for "Dis-moi, dis-moi".

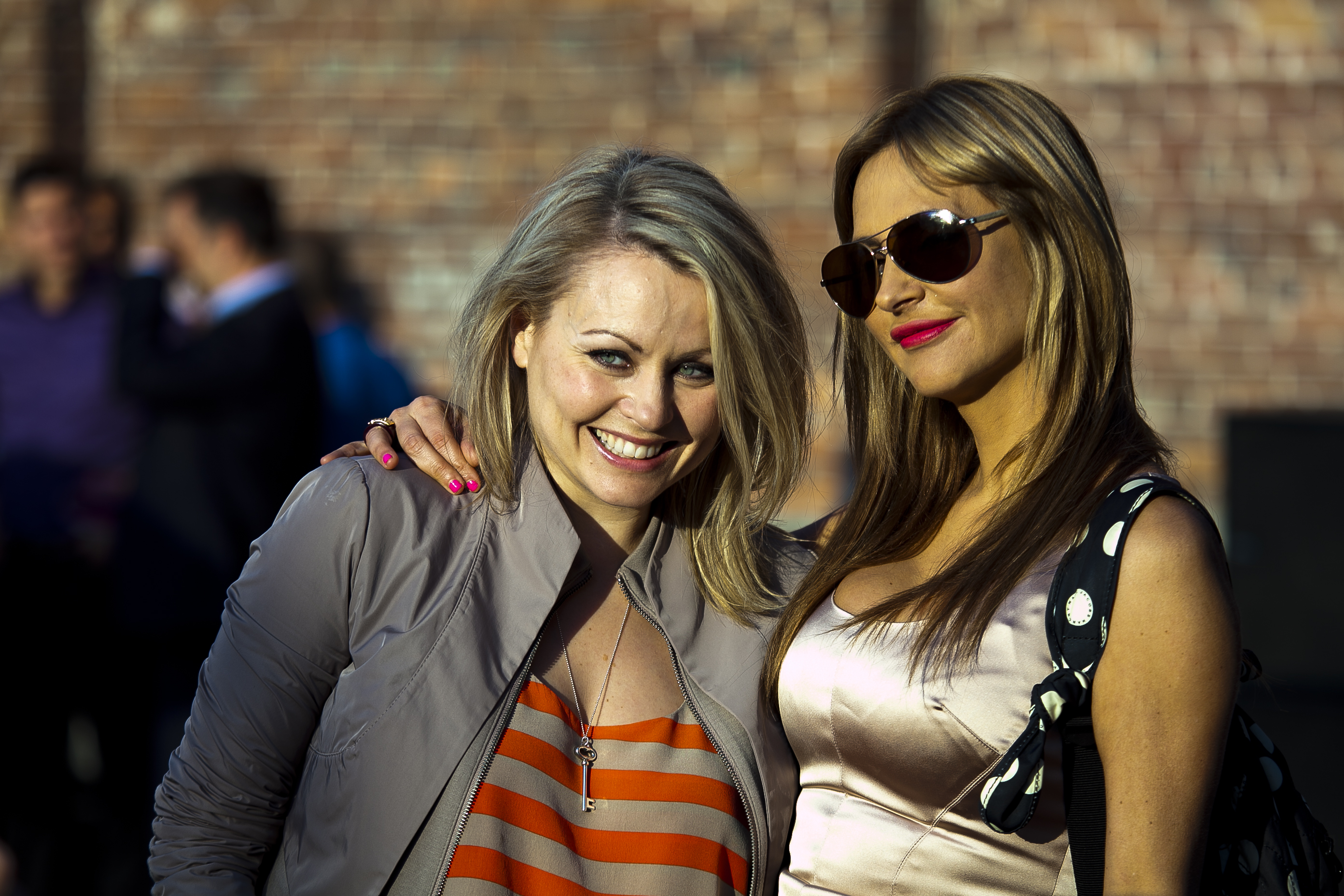
Mitsou (left) with Anne-Marie Losique in 2012.

=== Heading West ===
In 1992 she released the followup EP Heading West, which featured several of her earlier singles alongside the new single "Deep Kiss", and covers of Cyndi Lauper's "Heading West" and Janis Joplin's "Mercedes Benz". The album initially received a Juno nomination for Francophone Album of the Year at the Juno Awards of 1993, sparking some controversy when the Juno Awards subsequently rescinded the nomination on the grounds that the album didn't meet the criteria of being at least 80 per cent francophone. The award committee claimed that the album's failure to qualify in the category had "slipped through the cracks" due to a last-minute submission, but Mitsou herself dismissed the controversy as an unimportant "tempest in a thimble".

In 1992 she also made her film acting debut with appearances in Danièle J. Suissa's television film Prince Lazure and Richard Ciupka's romantic comedy-drama film Coyote.

=== Tempted ===
In 1993, she followed it up with her first full-English album Tempted.

The lead single "Everybody Say Love" was written by RuPaul, who offered it to her after they met while she was working with RuPaul's production and songwriting collaborator Jimmy Harry.

=== Return to French-language music ===
She returned to recording primarily French-language material for her 1994 album Ya Ya, which included cover versions of songs popular in Quebec in the '60s and '70s, such as Joël Denis's French-language version of the Lee Dorsey song "Ya Ya", and Marc Hamilton's "Comme j'ai toujours envie d'aimer".

She followed up in 1996 with a Christmas album entitled Noël.

Her next album, Mitsou (Éponyme), was released in 1999, featuring hip-hop-influenced beats and a street-oriented rock sound. She also co-wrote and co-produced all the tracks. The club-oriented EP MitsouVibe, comprising new remixes of past singles, followed in 2002.

=== Media and acting ===
Following MitsouVibe, she began turning to other creative and business activities as she entered her 30s, including serving as editor of a fashion magazine for young women, Clin d'Œil, and acting in the films Alice's Odyssey (L'Odyssée d'Alice Tremblay) and The Barbarian Invasions (Les invasions barbares).

In 2000, she joined C't’encore drôle, the morning show on Énergie 94.3 FM in Montreal. She remained with the station until 2012, when she left to join rival CFGL-FM as afternoon co-host with Sébastien Benoît until 2021.

In 2005, she debuted as host of Au Courant, an English-language program that focuses on French Canadian culture, for CBC Newsworld. The announcement faced some controversy, with Nathalie Petrowski of La Presse claiming that hiring Mitsou as an authority on Quebec culture was like hiring Pamela Anderson to moderate an election debate; she claimed to be a fan of Mitsou, but insisted that she was much more of an authority on matters of fashion and style than of serious arts and culture. At the end of the year, Brendan Kelly of the Montreal Gazette summed up the controversy by stating that "what everyone missed is that Mitsou, besides being gorgeous and telegenic, is actually one bright, articulate person." In 2006, the show was nominated for a Gemini Award in the Best Talk Series category.

In February 2009, it was announced that Mitsou would become the "beauty ambassador" for Lise Watier, a Canadian-based cosmetics and skincare product line, and would subsequently appear in the company's advertising campaigns.

In the late 2000s and early 2010s she hosted television programs including the cooking show Kampaï! À votre santé, for Radio-Canada, the cultural magazine show La liste for ARTV, and the documentary series Comment va ta famille? for V.

She also had another acting role in The Child Prodigy (L'Enfant prodige), a movie about pianist André Mathieu, in which she played Vivianne Jobin, one of Mathieu's mistresses.

In August 2010, Mitsou married her partner of 15 years, Iohann Martin, in a "surprise wedding" that he had organized without her knowledge for her 40th birthday. They are the parents of two daughters. They separated in 2023 but remain business partners.

In 2011 she collaborated with Creature on the song "On vole", her first new music since the MitsouVibe EP.

In 2017, she hosted Canada Day in Ottawa with actress Sandra Oh, attended by Justin Trudeau, Prince Charles and Camilla Parker Bowles, as well as Bono and The Edge.

=== Mitsou Magazine ===
In 2018 she launched Mitsou Magazine, a web publication devoted to health, beauty and lifestyle information for women. She later expanded this with the launch of Mitsou Cuisine, featuring healthy and nutritious recipes.

In 2019, she debuted as cohost with Léa Clermont-Dion of the TVA documentary series Mitsou et Léa, which profiled strong and remarkable women.

In 2021 she appeared as a guest judge in a second season episode of Canada's Drag Race. Her 1993 single "Everybody Say Love", originally written by RuPaul, was used as the Lip Sync for Your Life number.

In 2022, Mitsou and her sisters, Abeille and Noémie, published the book Bien-être inspiré - Trouver l'harmonie Corps, Coeur, Esprit, a guide to healthy living.

A year later, she returned to music, collaborating with singer Laurence Nerbonne on "Cowgirl", a song which alludes to "Bye Bye Mon Cowboy" and sees Nerbonne directly praising Mitsou as Quebec's original "girlboss". In the same year, Pierre Lapointe invited her to take part in his Chansons hivernales tour of Christmas shows across Quebec, alongside other guest artists.

In June 2024, she took part in the Saint-Jean-Baptiste show on the Plains of Abraham.

In March 2025, the docureality series Trois sœurs et un chalet premiered on Canal Vie and Crave, in which Mitsou and her sisters renovate the chalet bequeathed to them by their father Alain.

== Discography ==
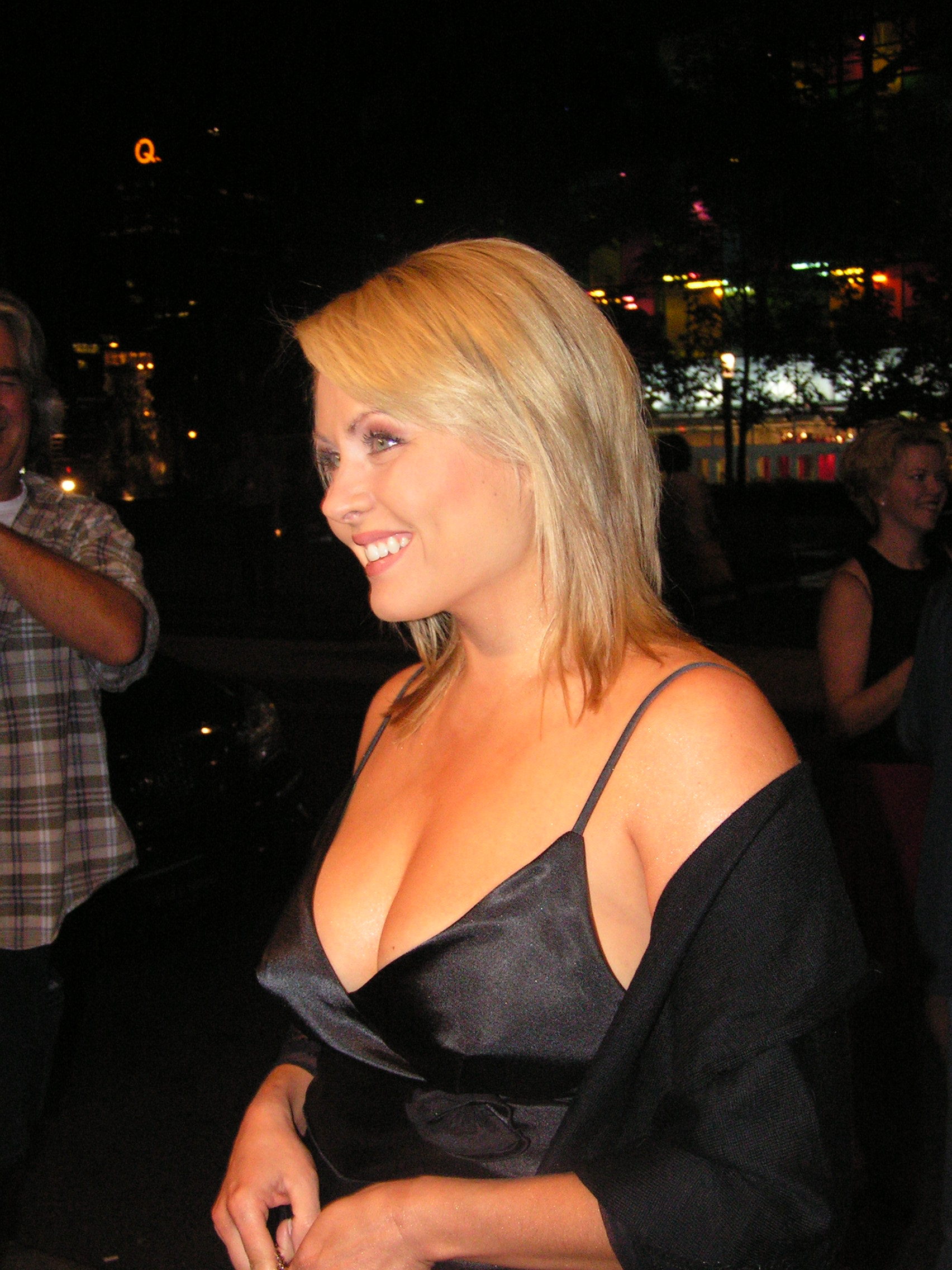
Mitsou in 2004

=== Albums ===
- El Mundo (Isba) 1988 (Platinum)
- Terre des Hommes (Isba) 1990 (Gold)
- Heading West (Isba) 1992
- Mitsou (Hollywood Records) 1992 (U.S. compilation)
- Tempted (TOX) 1993
- Ya Ya (TOX) 1994
- Noël (TOX) 1995
- La Collection (Unidisc) 1997 (compilation)
- Mitsou (Dazmo) 1999
- Vibe EP (Dazmo) 2002

=== Singles ===
- "Bye Bye Mon Cowboy" (Isba) (1988) Canada No. 63 / Québec No. 1 (6 weeks)
- "Les Chinois" (Isba) (1989) Québec No. 2
- "La Corrida" (Isba) (1989)
- "Mademoiselle Anne" (Isba) (1990)
- "Dis-moi, dis-moi" (Isba) (1991) Canada No. 63
- "Lettre à un Cowboy" (Isba) (1991) Québec No. 1
- "A Funny Place (The World Is)" (Isba) (1991)
- "Deep Kiss" (Isba) (1992)
- "Heading West" (Isba) (1992)
- "Everybody Say Love" (1993)
- "Le Yaya" (1994)
- "Comme j'ai toujours envie d'aimer" (1994)
- "Ouvre-moi" (1999)
- "Si tu m'aimes encore" (1999)
- "Les Ronces" (1999)
- "La Vie Sera" (1999)
- "A Toi (You and I)" (2002)
- "Bye Bye Mon Cowboy (vibe mix)" (2002)
- "Mon Roi" (2002)
- "On vole" (2011)
- "Cowgirl" (2023, with Laurence Nerbonne)

== See also ==
- List of Quebec musicians
- Music of Quebec
- Culture of Quebec
