= Jean-François Michael =

French singer

- Born: Yves Roze; 16 April 1946
- Origin: France
- Genres: Pop
- Occupations: Singer
- Instruments: Vocals
- Years active: 1963 – present
- Label: Vogue Schallplatten

Yves Roze, better known as Jean-François Michael (born 16 April 1946) is a French singer. Between 1963 and 1968, he sang under his birth name Yves Roze. In 1968, Michel Berger (under his real name Michel Hamburger) wrote "Adieu jolie Candy" that was a hit for Jean-François Michael. It sold over one million copies, and was awarded a gold disc.

Under the new name Jean-François Michael, sometimes written with a diaeresis on the "e" in Michael, as in Jean-François Michaël, he released three albums between 1968 and 1972, and a number of singles, but struck by a grave illness, he abandoned his musical career. He came back in 1975, but as a music director and record producer.

== Discography ==
=== Albums ===
- Adieu jolie Candy
- Jean-François Michael
- Le Retour
- Adieu jolie Candy (de 1969 à 2007) (compilation)

=== Singles ===
As Yves Roze

- 1967: "Sylvie"
- 1967: "Notre amour et puis c’est tout"
- 1967: "Plus fort que le vent"

As Jean-François Michael

- 1969: "Adieu jolie Candy"
- 1970: "Du fond du cœur"
- 1970: "Je pense à toi"
- 1970: "Adios quérida luna"
- 1970: "Più di ieri (Comme j'ai toujours envie d'aimer)"
- 1970: "La vie continue"
- 1970: "Les filles de Paris"
- 1971: "Je pense à toi"
- 1971: "Je veux vivre auprès de toi"
- 1971: "Un an déjà"
- 1971: "L’espion de l'empereur" (Soundtrack to the television series "Schulmeister")
- 1972: "Pour quoi faire?"
- 1972: "Ladybelle"
- 1973: "Coupable"
- 1973: "Comme elle"
- 1975: "Sans amour après l'amour"
- 1976: "Baby blue, I love you"
- 1976: "Fais un mariage d'amour"
- 1977: "Ne me regarde pas comme ça"
- 1979: "Sentiments"
- 1980: "Comme j’ai toujours envie d’aimer"
- 1981: "Elle et moi"
- 1982: "L'amour"
- 1983: "Pars pas"
- 1984: "Rappelle-toi Candy"
