= Je te serai fidèle =

Studio album by Roch Voisine
- Released: November 17th 2003
- Genres: Pop, rock

Je te serai fidèle is a 2003 French language album by Canadian singer Roch Voisine. It includes six new songs and nine entirely revamped hits.

== Track listing ==
1. "Ne m’oublie pas"
2. "Tant pis"
3. "Darlin'"
4. "La Berceuse du petit diable" (Little Devil's Lullaby)
5. "On mentira"
6. "Je l'ai vu"
7. "Laisse-là rêver" (She Had A Dream)
8. "My lady mio segreto" (Ma Lady, Mon Secret)
9. "Délivre-moi" (Deliver Me)
10. "Ouvre les yeux"
11. "Pourtant"
12. "Avant de partir"
13. "On a tous une étoile"
14. "Je te serai fidèle" ("I'll Always Be There")
15. "Hélène"

== Charts ==
Chart (2003)	Peak position
Belgian Albums (Ultratop Wallonia)	11
French Albums (SNEP)	5
Swiss Albums (Schweizer Hitparade)	42
