= Christmas Is Calling =

Christmas is Calling

Studio album by Roch Voisine
- Released: 2000
- Recorded: 2000

L'album de Noël is a 2000 English language Christmas album by Canadian singer Roch Voisine. He simultaneously released a French language Christmas album titled L'album de Noël.

== Track listing ==
1. Silent Night
2. White Christmas
3. Winter Wonderland
4. Joy To The World
5. Sleigh Ride
6. Little Drummer Boy
7. I'll Be Home For Christmas
8. O Christmas Tree
9. Happy Christmas
10. The Christmas Song
11. What Child Is This
12. Silver Bells
13. Blue Christmas
14. Christmas Is Calling
15. O Holy Night
