= Coup de tête (album) =

Studio album by Roch Voisine
- Released: 1994
- Recorded: 1994
- Genre: Pop, rock, folk

Roch Voisine chronology
I'll Always Be There (1993)	Coup de tête (1994)	Kissing Rain (1996)

Coup de tête is a 1994 French language album by Canadian singer Roch Voisine. It includes the hit singles "Laisse-la rêver" and "Jean Johnny Jean".

== Track listing ==
1. "Coup de tête"
2. "J'entends frapper"
3. "Jean Johnny Jean"
4. "Laisse-la rêver (She Had a Dream)"
5. "Ma lady mon secret"
6. "Miss Caprice"
7. "Seine et St-Laurent"
8. "Le Vagabond"
9. "Celui-là"
10. "Dites-moi"
11. "L'Homme du Nord"
12. "Lettre au chanteur"
13. "Ma mère chantait toujours"
