= Americana (video) =

Video by The Offspring
- Released: December 8, 1998 (VHS); December 14, 1999 (DVD)
- Recorded: 1983–1998
- Genre: Punk rock
- Length: 60:00
- Label: Nitro, Columbia

The Offspring chronology
| Americana (1998) | Huck It (2000) |

Professional ratings
Review scores
| Source | Rating |
|---|---|
| AllMusic | 1.5/5 stars |

Americana is a video album (released in VHS and DVD formats) by the American punk rock band The Offspring. It contains videos of the band performing stunts along with other extreme sport professionals, and also several music performances by the band. Homemade music videos for the songs "Mota" and "Burn It Up" are also featured. It also features four shoplifting attempts by the band and friends (these attempts are probably staged, however). The video album shares the same title as the band's 1998 studio album, but contains no videos and very little from it. AllMusic called it "low quality" and "no way near as well filmed" as the following video album Huck It.

== Track listing ==
1. "Welcome to the Dollhouse"
2. "Garage Days"
3. "Cool to Hate"
4. "The Meaning of Life"
5. "Smash and Grab Part 1"
6. "All I Want"
7. "Mota"
8. "Smash and Grab Part 2"
9. "Gotta Get Away"
10. "Nitro"
11. "Take It Like a Man"
12. "Burn It Up"
13. "Bad Habit"
14. "Smash and Grab Part 3"
15. "Nothing from Something"
16. "Gone Away"
17. "Crossroads"
18. "Smash and Grab Part 4"
19. "Built for Speed"
20. "Self Esteem"
21. "The Final Battle"
