= Americana de Aviación =

IATA	ICAO	Call sign
8E	ANE	Americana
- Founded: 1990
- Commenced operations: 1991
- Ceased operations: 1997
- Fleet size: See Fleet details below
- Destinations: See Destinations served below
- Key people: Juan Manuel Pereira Medina (President - Founder); Victor D. Ortiz de Villate (General Manager)

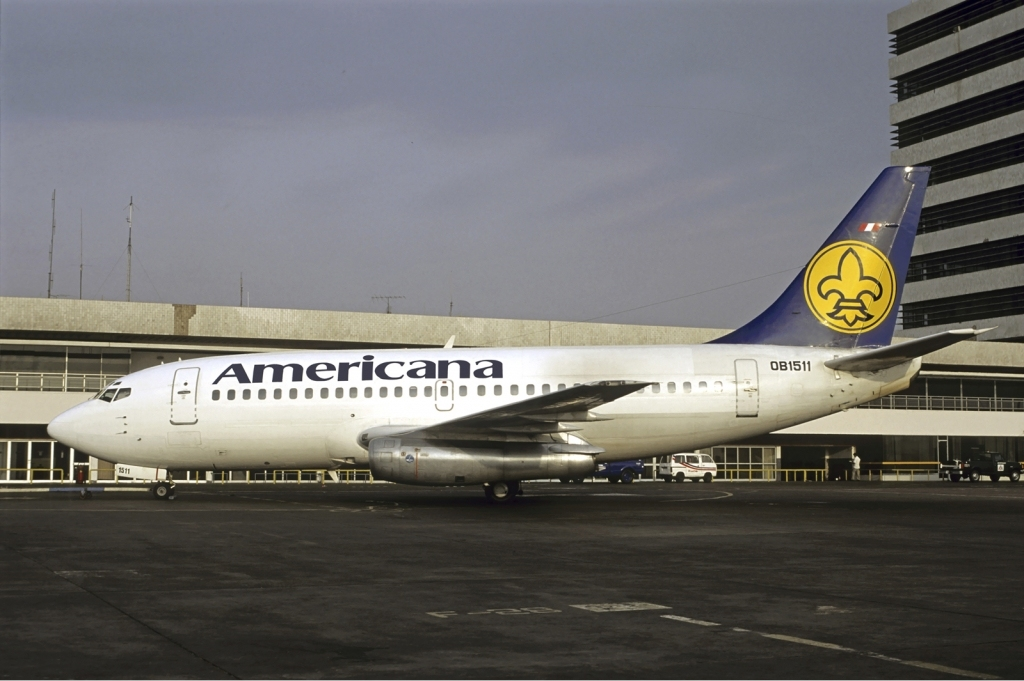
Americana de Aviación Boeing 737-200, Lima, 1994

Americana de Aviación was a private airline based in Perú.

== Company history ==
Americana de Aviación was founded in 1990 and began operations in 1991 using a Boeing 727-077 with regional routes within Peru. Its founders were Juan Manuel Pereira Medina (President-Founder) and Victor D. Ortiz de Villate (General Manager). In 1996, they sold their majority stock participation to Luis Chan Lay who named his partner, Leandro Chiok Chang (new Executive President), as his front man.

At one point, it was Peru's largest domestic airline. In mid-1997, the Peruvian government grounded all B727 and by early 1998, it was only allowed to fly charters but not under its own name. Soon, the 727s were replaced with Boeing 737-200s, but poor management by the new owners and a weak financial picture in South America forced Americana to cease operations.

== Destinations ==
- Lima
- Arequipa
- Ayacucho
- Chiclayo
- Cuzco
- Juliaca
- Piura
- Pucallpa
- Puerto Maldonado
- Tacna
- Trujillo
- Tumbes
- Iquitos
- Mendoza (Argentina)
- Cordova (Argentina)
- Salta (Argentina)
- Rio Branco (Brasil)
- Manaos (Brasil)
- Cali (Colombia)
- Santo Domingo (República Dominicana)

== Fleet details ==
- 1 - Boeing 727-023
- 3 - Boeing 727-027
- 1 - Boeing 727-41
- 2 - Boeing 727-077
- 1 - Boeing 727-162
- 1 - Boeing 727-230
- 1 - Boeing 737-205
- 1 - Boeing 737-281
- 1 - Boeing 737-293
- 1 - Fokker F28 Fellowship (leased from Peruvian Air Force in 1993 and 1996)
