= AmerIIcana =

Americana II

Studio album by Roch Voisine
- Released: 2009
- Recorded: 2009
- Genre: Rock; pop; country
- Label: RCA Victor Europe

Roch Voisine chronology
Americana (2008)	Americana II (2009)	Americana III (2010)

Professional ratings
Review scores
Source	Rating
allmusic	2.5/5 stars

AmerIIcana or alternatively Americana II is a 2009 album by Canadian singer Roch Voisine. It was a follow-up of his successful Americana album in 2008. Many of the tracks were recorded in Nashville, Tennessee.

== Track listing ==
Bonus bilingual English / French version tracks marked with [*]

1. "That's How I Got to Memphis"
2. "Don't Think Twice, It's All Right"
3. "Take It Easy"
4. "If I Were a Carpenter"
5. "I'm Sorry"
6. "Take Me Home, Country Roads"
7. "Song Sung Blue"
8. "Sundown"
9. "Johnny B. Goode"
10. "Pretty Woman"
11. "Heart of Gold"
12. "Bon Vivant"
13. "That's How I Got to Memphis" / Sur la route de Memphis [*]
14. "If I Were a Carpenter" / Si j'étais un charpentier [*]
15. "Song Sung Blue" / Chanson bleue [*]
16. "Sundown" / L'amour c'est comme l'été [*]
17. "Bon Vivant" [*]

== Charts ==
=== Weekly charts ===
Chart (2009–2011)	Peak position
Belgian Albums (Ultratop Wallonia)	5
Canadian Albums (Billboard)	3
French Albums (SNEP)	9
Swiss Albums (Schweizer Hitparade)	46

=== Year-end charts ===
Chart (2009)	Position
French Albums (SNEP)	112
Chart (2011)	Position
Canadian Albums (Billboard)	44

== Certifications ==
Region	Certification	Certified units/sales
Canada (Music Canada)	Gold	40,000^{^}
^{^} Shipments figures based on certification alone.

== See also ==
- Americana (Roch Voisine album)
- Americana III
