= Sauf si l'amour... =

Studio album by Roch Voisine
- Released: 31 October 2005
- Studios: Studio Piccolo, Montreal; The Fridge, Montreal
- Genres: Pop music, Rock, Chanson
- Length: 46:38
- Labels: RCA, Sony BMG
- Producers: Roch Voisine, RV International

Sauf si l'amour... is a 2005 French language album by Canadian singer Roch Voisine. It was released on 31 October 2005 in Europe. The album includes 12 songs, written by a team of outside songwriters rather than by Voisine himself.

== Background and release ==
Following the release of his best of album of 2003, Je te serai fidèle, he began to work on a new French-language studio album Sauf si l'amour...which was released on 31 October 2005,giving Voisine his ninth French language album and his thirteenth studio album. Voisine explained in an interview: "He "let his sailor friends to borrow the pen and write him words and notes". He took the decision to sing others' songs because they were "the most beautiful".

The album was recorded at Studio Piccolo and The Fridge in Montreal, Canada. It was produced by Voisine under his RV International label and distributed by RCA / Sony BMG. The 2006 re-issue features a new recorded solo version in French of the final song "Redonne-moi ta confiance" replacing the original collaboration with italian singer Giorgia.

== Composition and style ==
Musically, the album is based on French variété and pop rock, with the guitars and pianos, as well as a set of modern synthesisers. The majority of the songs were written by Léa Ivanne (lyrics) and Bill Ghiglione (music), who contributed to six of the twelve tracks. Voisine wrote some songs as well, including French-language reissues of two of his previous English-language songs: "Ne viens pas" (from "With These Eyes") and "Ici ou ailleurs" (from "Higher").

The opening track, "Une femme (parle avec son cœur)", was the first single of the album. he lyrics talk about love, aging and relationships from the point of view of a more experienced narrator. Voisine said of the overall mood of the album: "the love of aging usually falls apart" ("l'amour se casse la gueule, le plus souvent") thus enabling him to relate to his audience by analyzing the stories as an observer rather than an author.

== Critical reception ==
The first review for the album was mixed or good. Avenue du Rock (Zicline) was more cautious and considered that the album was "faithful to himself, in an always impeccable style, without real surprise," and to note that the album was a little bit leaning to French variété. They also added that "It may lack a little punch, but all the same Voisine will make some hearts flutter with his ballads.

Meanwhile Le Matin focused on the fact that the songs were written by the singers together, explaining that Voisine "loaned his pen to his sailor friends to write words and notes to him" and that his album would resonate with his hardcore audience. La Dernière Heure later called the album "a nice success" and "a good barometer of the crooner's evolution."

== Commercial performance ==
Sauf si l'amour... became a commercial hit in France and Belgium but not as successful as some of his other records.

In France, the album entered the SNEP Albums Chart at number 6 on 24 October 2005. It remained on the chart for a total of 63 weeks. It was certified Gold just two weeks after its release. Le Progrès confirmed its Gold status in a 2007 article, noting it followed the Platinum certification of his previous album. By contrast, Le Parisien later observed that the album "did not meet the same commercial echo" as his previous successes, despite his concerts remaining popular.

In Switzerland, the album entered the Hitparade on 13 November 2005 and peaked at number 32 during a four-week run.

== Track listing ==
Standard edition
No.	Title	Writer(s)	Length
1.	"Une femme (parle avec son cœur)"	Léa Ivanne, Bill Ghiglione	4:18
2.	"Sauve-moi"	Léa Ivanne, Bill Ghiglione	3:33
3.	"Même si"	Christophe Bardy, Christophe Balency	3:26
4.	"Ne viens pas (With These Eyes)"	Dean Landon, Donna Pacifici, Lillian Di Zazzo, Roch Voisine; adapted by Léa Ivanne	3:44
5.	"Ici ou ailleurs (Higher)"	Ali Thomson, Peter John Vettese, Roch Voisine; adapted by Léa Ivanne	3:31
6.	"Ne plus aimer"	Mathieu Dulac, Rodrigue Janois, William Rousseau	3:22
7.	"T'aimer vraiment"	Léa Ivanne, Bill Ghiglione	3:55
8.	"Quelque part"	Léa Ivanne, Bill Ghiglione	3:24
9.	"Un frère, un ami"	Francis Basset, Roch Voisine, Romano Musumarra, Salvatore Campanile	3:57
10.	"Apothéose"	Léa Ivanne, Bill Ghiglione	4:58
11.	"Sauf si l'amour s'évapore"	Xavier Druot	4:05
12.	"Redonne-moi ta confiance" (duet with Giorgia)	Léa Ivanne, Bill Ghiglione	4:23

2006 re-issue bonus track
No.	Title	Writer(s)	Length
12.	"Redonne-moi ta confiance" (solo version, entirely in French)	Léa Ivanne, Bill Ghiglione	4:23

== Release history ==
Region	Date	Label	Format	Catalog
Europe	31 October 2005	RCA / Sony BMG	CD, digital	82876 740 182
Europe (re-issue)	2006	RCA / Sony BMG	CD	82876 892 992
