= Americana III =

Studio album by Roch Voisine
- Released: 2010
- Recorded: 2010
- Genres: Rock; pop; country
- Label: RCA Victor Europe

Roch Voisine chronology
AmerIIcana (2009)	Americana III (2010)	Confidences (2010)

Professional ratings
Review scores
Source	Rating
AllMusic	2.5/5 stars

Americana III or alternatively California Americana III is a 2010 album by Canadian singer Roch Voisine. It was a follow-up of his successful Americana album in 2008 and Americana II album in 2009. The album was also known as the California album in contrast to the first two that were recorded mostly in Nashville, Tennessee.

== Track listing ==
Bonus bilingual English / French version tracks marked with [*]

1. "Turn! Turn! Turn! (To Everything There is a Season)" (3:44)
2. "San Francisco" (3:15)
3. "California Dreamin'" (2:43)
4. "Mrs. Robinson" (3:59)
5. "God Only Knows" (2:46)
6. "A Horse with No Name" (4:04)
7. "Southern Cross" (4:39)
8. "I'm a Believer" (2:55)
9. "Both Sides Now" (4:09)
10. "California Dreamin'" / La terre promise (2:44) [*]
11. "San Francisco" (3:13) [*]

== Chart performance ==
Chart (2011)	Peak position
Canadian Albums Chart	15
