= Sauce américaine =

Recipe from classic French cookery

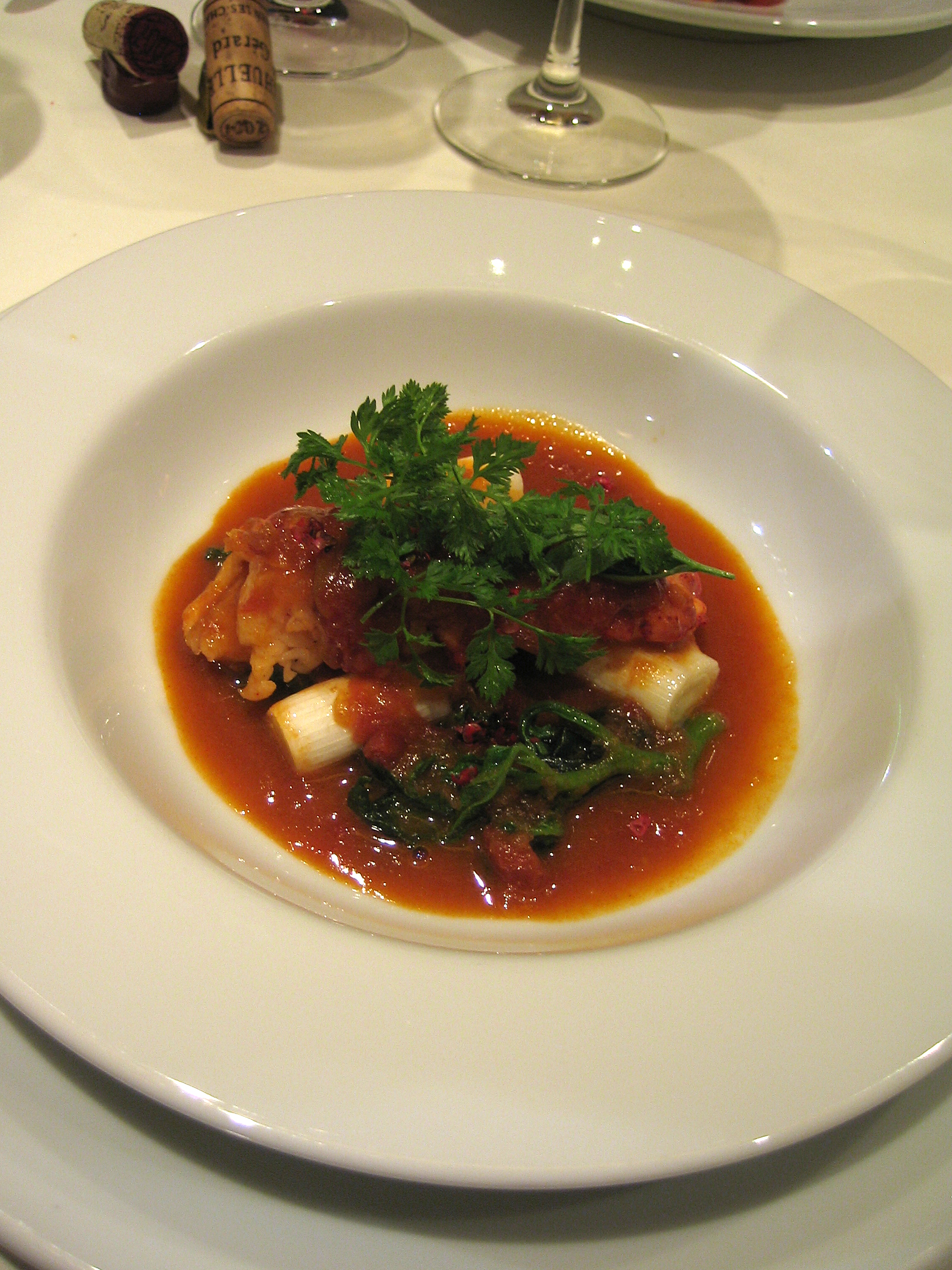
Lobster with sauce américaine

Sauce américaine (pronounced [sos ameʁikɛn]; French for 'American sauce') is a recipe from classic French cookery containing chopped onions, tomatoes, white wine, brandy, salt, cayenne pepper, butter and fish stock. It is sometimes incorrectly referred to as sauce armoricaine (pronounced [sos aʁmɔʁikɛn]), but in fact the sauce was invented by a cook from Sète, Hérault, who had worked in the United States.

== Recipe ==
Louis Saulnier gives the following recipe:

Américaine - Treat as for Lobster Américaine. Pound shells and meat in the mortar and incorporate equal quantity of fish velouté, add butter.

As with many other classic dishes the original recipe has been adapted over time and almost every chef will prepare the sauce in a slightly different way. Modern recipes usually include tarragon and use lobster stock rather than pounded lobster, and often replace cayenne pepper with paprika.
