= Best Of (Roch Voisine album) =

Best of

Greatest hits album by Roch Voisine
- Released: In 2 versions Canadian on 18 September 2007; European on 26 November 2007
- Genres: Pop; rock
- Label: RCA Victor Europe

Best of is a 2007 album of Canadian singer Roch Voisine. It is a double album containing a collection of his best hits (in French and English) from the start of his career until 2007. It was released in 2 versions:

- Canadian Version: 2 CDs (containing 2 new releases) and 2 Bonus songs
- European Version: 2 CDs (containing 2 new releases) and 2 Bonus songs

== Track listings ==
=== Canadian version ===

CD 1:

1. "Garder le feu" (new version)
2. "Hélène"
3. "Pourtant"
4. "Avant de partir"
5. "L'Idole"
6. "La Promesse"
7. "Darlin'"
8. "La Berceuse du petit diable"
9. "Bye Bye"
10. "Avec tes yeux Pretty Face"
11. "Laisse-la rêver"
12. "Miss caprice"
13. "Un Simple Gars"
14. "J'attends"
15. "Tant pis"
16. "Je te serai fidèle"
17. "Obia"
18. "Ne me laisse jamais partir" (new)

CD 2:

1. "La légende Oochigeas"
2. "Délivre-moi"
3. "Jean Johnny Jean"
4. "Hélène" (rock)
5. "Kissing Rain"
6. "Wind & Tears"
7. "Shout Out Loud"
8. "With These Eyes"
9. "By Myself"
10. "I'll Always Be There"

Bonus:

1. "Quelque part" (new version)
2. Video: Exclusive interview with Roch Voisine about his career

=== European version ===
CD 1:

1. "Garder le feu" (new)
2. "Hélène"
3. "Pourtant"
4. "Avant de partir"
5. "L'Idole"
6. "La Promesse"
7. "Darlin'"
8. "La Berceuse du petit diable"
9. "Bye bye"
10. "Avec tes yeux Pretty face"
11. "Laisse-la rêver"
12. "Miss caprice"
13. "Un simple gars"
14. "Et si"
15. "J'attends"
16. "Tant pis"
17. "Je te serai fidèle"
18. "Le chemin" (New)

CD 2:

1. "La légende Oochigeas"
2. "Darlin'"
3. "Délivre-moi"
4. "Jean Johnny Jean"
5. "Hélène" (rock)
6. "Kissing Rain"
7. "Wind & Tears"
8. "Shout Out Loud"
9. "Pretty Face"
10. "With These Eyes"
11. "By Myself"
12. "I'll Always Be There"

Bonus:

1. "Obia"
2. "Je ne suis pas un héros"
