= Darlin' (Roch Voisine song) =

1991 single by Roch Voisine

Single by Roch Voisine

from the album Double
- B-side: "Instrumental"
- Released: February 1991
- Recorded: 1990
- Genre: Soft rock, pop
- Length: 4:15
- Label: Productions Georges Mary
- Songwriters: Roch Voisine, Tino Izzo, Yvan Décary, Rosanna Ciciola
- Producers: Roch Voisine, André Di Cesare

Roch Voisine singles chronology
"La Berceuse du petit diable" (1990)	"Darlin'" (1991)	"On the Outside" (1991)

"Darlin'" is a 1990 soft rock and pop song recorded by Canadian singer Roch Voisine. It was released in January 1991 as the second single from his second studio album Double, on which it appears as the sixth track. It became a top five hit in France and Belgium (Wallonia); in addition, it was nominated for the Félix Award given in Quebec by the ADISQ in the category "Popular song of the year".

== Versions ==
"Darlin'" was performed during Voisine's 1992 tour and thus included on the live albums Europe Tour and Roch Voisine Live, as well as on the compilation Best Of. Voisine recorded a new version of "Darlin'" first in 2003 on his album Je te serai fidèle, then in 2013 as a duet with the Montreal All-Star Choir, on his album Duophonique.

== Chart performance ==
In France, "Darlin'" debuted at number 37 on the chart edition of 2 March 1991, then performed the biggest jump of the week, gaining 20 positions, entered the top ten in its fourth week and reached its highest position, number two, for non-consecutive three weeks, being blocked by Scorpions's international hit "Wind of Change", and by Mylène Farmer's "Désenchantée" which successively topped the chart. It remained for a total of 12 weeks in the top ten and 19 weeks in the top 50. It achieved Silver status, awarded by the Syndicat National de l'Édition Phonographique. In Belgium (Wallonia), it featured for four weeks in the top ten, with a peak at number five on 11 May 1991. On the European Hot 100 Singles, it debuted at number 74 on 23 March 1991, reached a peak of number 12 in the ninth week, and fell off the top 100 after 16 weeks of presence, eight of them spent in the top 20.

== Track listings ==
- CD maxi
1. "Darlin'" – 4:15
2. "Darlin'" (instrumental) – 4:15
3. "Elle a peur des hirondelles" – 3:48
- 7" single – France, Germany
1. "Darlin'" – 4:15
2. "Darlin'" (instrumental) – 4:15
- 7" single – Canada
1. "Darlin'" – 4:15
2. "La Berceuse du petit diable" – 4:03

== Charts ==
=== Weekly charts ===
Chart (1991)	Peak position
Belgium (Ultratop 50 Wallonia)	5
Europe (European Hot 100)	12
France (SNEP)	2
Quebec (ADISQ)	4

=== Year-end charts ===
Chart (1991)	Position
Europe (European Hot 100)	67

== Certifications ==
Certifications for "Darlin'"
Region	Certification	Certified units/sales
France (SNEP)	Silver	125,000^{*}
^{*} Sales figures based on certification alone.

== Release history ==
Country	Date	Format	Label
France	1990	CD maxi	Productions Georges Mary
France	1990	7" single	Productions Georges Mary
Germany	1990	7" single	Productions Georges Mary
Canada	1990	7" single	Star Records
