= Higher (Roch Voisine album) =

Studio album by Roch Voisine
- Released: 2002
- Genre: Pop, rock

Higher is a 2002 English language album by Canadian singer Roch Voisine.

== Track listing ==
1. Higher
2. Don't Give Up
3. Life's a Beach
4. By Myself
5. That's More Like It
6. I Believe
7. Since You Left
8. Closer Than Skin
9. All About Us
10. Virtual Cowboys
11. Tears In My Coffee
12. The Antidote
13. Never
14. Myriam's Song (Will You Be My Wife)
