= Americanus =

Americanus, a Latin adjective meaning American, may refer to:

- Carl Linnaeus#Four races
- A pen name used by Benjamin Franklin
- A pseudonym used by John J. Beckley in newspapers
- "Junius Americanus", a pen name used by Arthur Lee (1740–1792), American diplomat and author
- Draco americanus, a legendary dragon species

== See also ==
- Americana (disambiguation), a Latin adjective with the same meaning
- Americanum
- Americano (disambiguation)
- Americain (disambiguation)
- American (disambiguation)
