= Robert Marien =

Canadian actor, singer, and songwriter (born 1955)

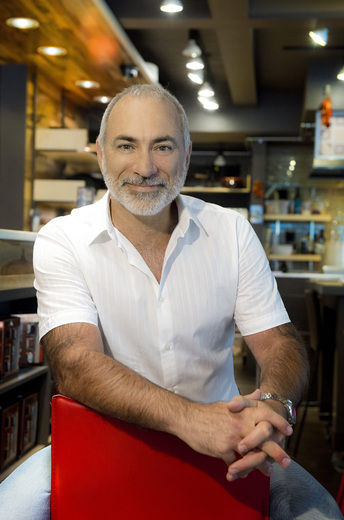

Background information
- Birth name: Robert Marien
- Born: May 5, 1955 (age 69)
- Occupation(s): Actor, singer, and songwriter

Robert Marien (born May 5, 1955) is a Canadian (Québécois) actor, singer, and songwriter who has performed in the musical Les Misérables in Montreal, Paris, New York City and London, as well as Notre Dame de Paris in both Korea and Japan. He has played the role of Jean Valjean in both English and in French, and has also appeared in numerous films and television shows such as Lance et Compte (1986-2010), and, most recently, Mensonges (2015).

Marien represented France in the international lineup of Valjeans in the encore of the 10th anniversary concert of Les Misérables, and has played the role of Jean Valjean in the Original Montréal cast, as well as the Paris revival cast in 1990. He has reprised this role in the West End and on Broadway, before he recorded his album Broadway-Montréal. He has been a prominent figure in the Francophone Broadway scene since his debut as Jean Valjean.

In 2005 the cast of Notre Dame de Paris performed a Korean and Japanese tour, of which Marien was a part, playing the role of Claude Frollo. In late 2014 this tour was revived in English, and ran until February 2015. It then came back to Korea in October 2015, this time in French, and ran until early 2016. In 2019 and 2021, he played Pontius Pilate in Jesus Christ Superstar in Tokyo, Japan.
