= Hélène (Roch Voisine song) =

Single by Roch Voisine

from the album Hélène
- B-side: "Ton Blues"
- Released: November 1989
- Length: 3:42
- Label: Ariola
- Songwriters: Stéphane Lessard; Roch Voisine
- Producer: Georges Mary

Roch Voisine singles chronology
"Hélène" (1989)	"Pourtant" (1990)

"Hélène" is a song by Canadian singer Roch Voisine. Written and composed by Voisine and Stéphane Lessard, with guitars played by Carl Katz and keyboards by Luc Gilbert, it was the first single from Voisine's debut studio album, Hélène, and was released in November 1989. The song is mainly in French but contains the English line "Hélène things you do / Make me crazy about you". The cover for the CD maxi used the same photograph as that of the album, Voisine's face with a black background. "Hélène" was successful in France, where it topped the singles chart for nine weeks, thus allowing Voisine to launch his international career.

== Music video ==
The music video features the singer and an air hostess who are in love, but who are forced to separate because of professional reasons. She may be French because when, in the video, she writes her name on a mirror with her lipstick, she does end it with an 'e' ('Helene'), as on the single cover. The model who plays the role of Hélène is Ariane Cordeau.

== Versions ==
"Hélène" is available on the Roch collection (2007), also known as Best of.Voisine also recorded the song wholly in English as "Helen" and included this version on the English portion of his bilingual album Double in 1990 (which was in turn released separately as a full-length English album titled Roch Voisine the same year). "Hélène" was also recorded in an acoustic version on his 2003 album Je te serai fidèle, which appeared as the second track on CD maxi for "Tant pis", released in February 2004. In 2013, he recorded a duet version with Cœur de pirate, which features on his album Duophonique.

== Critical reception ==
Music & Media considered "Hélène" as "a strong ballad, reminiscent of Elton John's early material", which is "vital for your play list".

== Chart performance ==
In France, the French version of "Hélène" started at number 27 on the chart edition of 11 November 1989, topped the chart for non consecutive nine weeks, in alternance with François Feldman's hit "Les Valses de Vienne", and remained in the top 50 for 27 weeks, 20 of them spent in the top ten. It was certified Platinum disc by the Syndicat National de l'Édition Phonographique for 800,000 units. Voisine thus became the first Canadian to reach number one on the French Singles Chart, followed by Bryan Adams, Céline Dion and Garou a few years later. The French version also peaked at number three in Norway, while the English version performed moderately well on RPM magazine's all-Anglophone singles charts, peaking at number 57 on the top 100 and number nine on the Adult Contemporary chart in very early 1990. It also achieved a moderate success in the Netherlands, peaking at number 53 two years after its original release.

== Track listings ==
- CD maxi
1. "Hélène" (new English version) — 3:42
2. "Hélène" (French version) — 3:42
3. "Hélène" (instrumental) — 3:42
- 7" single
1. "Hélène" — 3:42
2. "Ton Blues" — 3:35
- CD single
1. "Hélène" — 3:42
2. "Ton Blues" — 3:35

== Charts ==
=== Weekly charts ===
Weekly chart performance for "Hélène"
Chart (1989–1991)	Peak position
Belgium (Ultratop 50 Flanders)	9
Belgium (Ultratop 50 Wallonia)	3
Canada Top Singles (RPM) English version	57
Canada Adult Contemporary (RPM) English version	9
Europe (Eurochart Hot 100)	5
France (SNEP)	1
Netherlands (Single Top 100)	53
Norway (VG-lista)	3
Quebec (ADISQ)	1

Weekly chart performance for duet version of "Hélène" with Cœur de Pirate
Chart (2013)	Peak position
Belgium (Ultratip Bubbling Under Wallonia)	16
France (SNEP)	72

=== Year-end charts ===
Year-end chart performance for "Hélène"
Chart (1990)	Position
Belgium (Ultratop 50 Flanders)	34
Europe (Eurochart Hot 100)	26

== Certifications ==
Certifications for "Hélène"
Region	Certification	Certified units/sales
France (SNEP)	Platinum	800,000^{*}
^{*} Sales figures based on certification alone.

== See also ==
- List of number-one singles of 1989 (France)
- List of number-one singles of 1990 (France)
