= Roch Voisine =

Canadian singer-songwriter

Roch Voisine OC CQ ONB
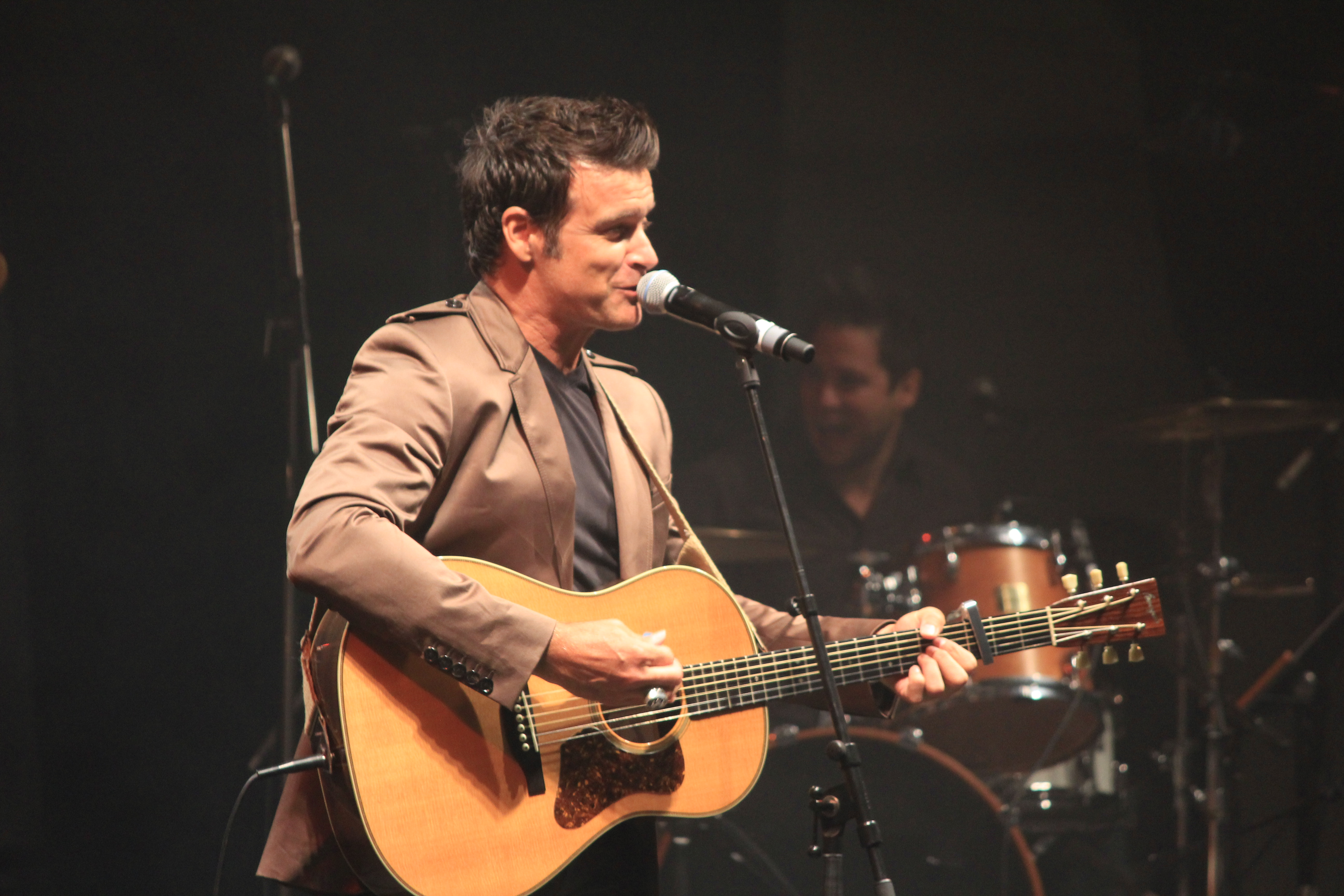
- Roch Voisine, 2012

Background information
- Born: Joseph Armand Roch Voisine; 26 March 1963 (age 63); Edmundston, New Brunswick, Canada
- Origin: Notre-Dame-du-Lac, Quebec, Canada
- Genres: Pop
- Occupations: Singer, actor, television host
- Instruments: vocals, guitar
- Years active: 1986–present
- Website: rochvoisine.com

Joseph Armand Roch Voisine, OC CQ ONB (born 26 March 1963) is a Canadian singer-songwriter, actor, and radio and television host who lives in Montreal and Paris. He writes and performs material in both English and French. He won the Juno Award for Male Vocalist of the Year in 1994. In 1997, he was made an Officer of the Order of Canada.

== Beginnings ==
Born in Edmundston, New Brunswick, Canada, he grew up in Saint-Basile, New Brunswick and later moved to Notre-Dame-du-Lac, Quebec when he was 12.

Voisine studied at École technique des métiers de Lauzon in Lévis (today Guillaume-Couture Secondary School) and at Polyvalente de Lévis (today École Pointe-Lévy). Then he continued for four years at Cégep Limoilou. He attended the University of Ottawa where he graduated in 1985 with a degree in physiotherapy and played four seasons with the uOttawa Gee-Gees men's hockey team.

Voisine aspired to be a professional ice hockey player. He had to set his plans aside when he was severely injured while playing baseball in 1981.

== Career ==
In the summer of 1986, he had his music debut when he sang on Canada Day (1 July) in front of 50,000 people at la Ronde amusement park in Montreal. He also worked as presenter of music videos on Top Jeunesse on the TQS (Télévision Quatre-Saisons) private French Quebec channel. In 1989, he appeared as Dany Ross in the CBC Television series Lance et Compte (He Shoots, He Scores).

Voisine's musical breakthrough came with his 1989 album Hélène which sold three million copies and became a major hit not only in Quebec but also in France, Belgium and Switzerland. In 1990, Hélène was awarded the Best Album prize at the Victoires de la Musique. He capitalized on his big success by releasing a bilingual French/English album Double with one CD containing all-French songs, the other all-English songs trying to position himself in both francophone and anglophone markets.

After a highly successful European Tour in 1991, he was awarded France's Chevalier de l'Ordre des Arts et des Lettres, becoming the youngest artist to receive it at age 28. His second European tour culminated on 17 April 1992 at Champ-de-Mars in Paris where he sang in front of 75,000 people. The show was broadcast live on TF1 and reached 14 million viewers.

In 1993, Voisine had his biggest English-language hit to date with the single and album both entitled I'll Always Be There, on which he worked with David Foster. The single reached number four on the Canadian music charts while the album reached number seven. Also in 1993, his wax statue was launched in Musée Grévin in Paris. In 2004, he had a huge success with the traditional song "Jean Johnny Jean" written by Gildas Arzel. The song appeared in Voisine's album Coup de tête.

Over the years, he has continued alternating between recording both French and English-language albums. His French language work and concert tours have continued to enjoy success in Europe (especially France) and Quebec, while his English-language recordings are a frequent mainstay of Canadian adult contemporary radio. He also enjoys huge success internationally.

In 2006, he took part alongside other musicians in L'Or de nos vies in a formation named Fight Aids singing a song composed by Kyo. Revenues went to Fight Aids Monaco.

Université de Moncton, New Brunswick, Canada gave him an honorary doctorate in music in May 2007.

In the years 2008 to 2010, he launched his Americana series recorded in Nashville, Tennessee in tribute to American popular and country music. The third in the Americana series was dedicated to California music. In 2010 he also released the album Confidences in two separate European and Canadian editions. He was also one of the commentators for the men's hockey tournament for French television at the 2010 Winter Olympics in Vancouver. In 2013 he came back with an album of duos called Duophonique. In 2015, he released the single "Cap Enragé" as a duo with Natasha St-Pier.

He was inducted as a Chevalier de l'Ordre des Arts et des Lettres by France in 1992 and was made an Officer of the Order of Canada in 1995. He was made a Member of the Order of New Brunswick in 2014. He was made a Knight of the National Order of Quebec in 2025.

In 2026, he was inducted into the Canadian Songwriters Hall of Fame.

== Personal life ==
Roch Voisine was born in Edmundston, New Brunswick, Canada to Réal Voisine, former mayor of Notre-Dame-du-Lac, Quebec and a former English teacher, and to Zélande Robichaud, a former nurse. He grew up in Saint-Basile, New Brunswick. He is the oldest of three children. His brother Marc was born in 1965, and his sister, Janice, in 1966.

When Roch was four years old, Voisine's parents divorced and he moved to live with his paternal grandparents, Maurille and Dorina Racine Voisine, until he was eight, when he went to live with his father again. Roch considered his grandparents very influential on him, even as an adult. Roch moved to Notre-Dame-du-Lac when he was 12.

Voisine married Myriam Saint-Jean on 21 December 2002. The couple have two sons. On 15 October 2007, Voisine's website announced his and Myriam's separation. Later on, he had a short-lived relationship with Narimane Doumandji, a public relations specialist. He had been with Myriam Chantal since 2012 and the couple had a baby girl, Lily-Dorina, born July 1, 2020. According to Myriam Chantal's Facebook, Myriam and Roch split up in 2022.

== Discography ==
=== Albums ===
(Lack of positions prior to 1999 in Belgium, France and Switzerland does not mean necessarily that the albums did not chart. They may have charted, but lescharts.com lacks archives for albums for the period prior to 1999)

Year	Album	Peak positions					CRIA certification	SNEP certification
Year	Album	CAN	BEL (Fl)	BEL (Wa)	FRA	SWI	CRIA certification	SNEP certification
1986	Sweet Songs	—	—	—	—	—	—	—
1987	Roch Voisine	—	—	—	—	—	—	—
1989	Hélène	—	—	26	1	—	3× Platinum	Diamond
1990	Double	—	—	—	2	—	2× Platinum	2× Platinum
1990	Roch Voisine	49	—	—	—	—	3× Platinum	—
1992	Europe Tour	—	—	—	2	—	Gold	Platinum
1993	I'll Always Be There	7	—	—	7	—	4× Platinum	2× Gold
1994	Coup de tête	—	—	—	6	—	Platinum	2× Gold
1996	Kissing Rain	13	—	50	—	—	Platinum	—
1999	Chaque feu...^{A}	—	—	13	9	—	Gold	Gold
2000	L'album de Noël^{A}	—	—	29	24	—	—	Gold
2000	Christmas Is Calling	—	—	—	—	—	—	—
2001	Roch Voisine^{A}	96	—	24	10	54	—	Gold
2002	Higher	41	—	—	—	—	—	—
2003	Je te serai fidèle	39	—	11	5	42	—	2× Gold
2004	Le Noël de Roch	—	—	62	63	—	—	
2005	Sauf si l'amour...	—	—	11	6	32	—	Gold
2006	Roch Voisine Live	—	—	—	—	—	—	—
2007	Best Of^{A}	68	—	18	—	—	—	—
2008	Americana	1	—	9	3	22	Platinum	Gold
2009	AmerIIcana (aka Americana II)	3	—	5	9	46	Gold	Gold
2010	Americana III	15	—	18	18	98	—	—
2010	Confidences^{A}	3	—	37	30	72	—	Gold
2013	Duophonique^{A}	12	85	6	9	32	—	—
2017	Devant nous	45	71	12	16	27	—	—

- ^{A}Albums with separate Canadian and European editions.

=== Singles (English Language / Canada) ===
Year	Single	Chart Positions			Album
Year	Single	CAN AC	CAN	CAN Country	Album
1989	"Hélène"	9	57	—	Hélène
1990	"A Fishing Day"	—	53	19	Roch Voisine
1991	"On the Outside"	5	52	32	Roch Voisine
1991	"Waiting"	23	74	—	Roch Voisine
1993	"Oochigeas (Indian Song)"	4	54	—	I'll Always Be There
1993	"I'll Always Be There"	3	4	—	I'll Always Be There
1994	"There's No Easy Way"	2	43	—	I'll Always Be There
1994	"Lost Without You"	—	13	—	I'll Always Be There
1994	"Shout Out Loud"	1	15	—	I'll Always Be There
1994	"Am I Wrong"	10	45	—	I'll Always Be There
1994	"She Picked on Me"	3	21	—	I'll Always Be There
1995	"For Adam's Sake"	10	50	—	I'll Always Be There
1995	"Heaven or Hell"	20	88	—	I'll Always Be There
1996	"Kissing Rain"	3	13	—	Kissing Rain
1997	"Deliver Me"	1	28	45	Kissing Rain
1997	"Shed a Light"	8	32	—	Kissing Rain
1997	"With These Eyes"	10	72	—	Kissing Rain
1998	"Love Never Dies"	24	—	—	Kissing Rain
1998	"St. Anne of the Wild Blue Eyes"	40	—	—	Kissing Rain

=== Singles (Europe / French Canada) ===
Year	Single	Chart positions						Album
Year	Single	BEL (Wa) Ultratop	BEL (Wa) Ultratip	FRA	NED	NOR	SWI	Album
1989	"Hélène"	9	—	1	53	3	—	Hélène
1990	"Pourtant"	—	—	3	—	—	—	Hélène
1990	"Avant de partir"	—	—	7	—	—	—	Hélène
1990	"La Berceuse du petit diable"	6	—	3	—	—	—	Double
1991	"Darlin'"	5	—	2	—	—	—	Double
1991	"On the Outside"	38	—	10	21	—	—	Double
1991	"Waiting"	—	—	16	—	—	—	Double
1992	"La promesse"	—	—	3	—	—	—	Double
1992	"Avec tes yeux Pretty Face"	—	—	3	—	—	—	Europe Tour
1992	"La légende Oochigeas"	—	—	4	—	—	—	Europe Tour
1993	"I'll Always Be There"	2	—	20	—	—	—	I'll Always Be There
1994	"There's No Easy Way"	17	—	48	—	—	—	I'll Always Be There
1995	"Laisse-la rêver"	—	—	47	—	—	—	Coup de tête
1996	"Chaque jour de ta vie" (with Richard Marx)	—	—	—	—	—	—	Kissing Rain
1999	"Je resterai là"	—	—	69	—	—	—	Chaque feu...
2000	"Comme..."	—	—	47	—	—	—	European edition of Chaque feu...
2000	"Petit Papa Noël"	—	—	49	—	—	—	L'album de Noël
2002	"Dis-lui"	20	—	26	—	—	—	Roch Voisine
2002	"Julia"	—	—	74	—	—	—	Roch Voisine
2004	"Tant pis"	33	—	8	—	—	75	Je te serai fidèle
2004	"Je l'ai vu"	—	13	16	—	—	73	Je te serai fidèle
2006	"Une femme"	—	—	24	—	—	64	Sauf si l'amour...
2008	"City of New Orleans"	—	11	—	—	—	—	Americana
2010	"California Dreamin'"	—	19	—	—	—	—	Americana III
2010	"Décembre"	—	16	—	—	—	—	Confidences
2013	"Hélène" (with Cœur de pirate)	—	16	72	—	—	—	Duophonique
2017	"Tout me ramène à toi"	—	9	118	—	—	—	Devant Nous

== Filmography ==
- 1989: Lance et Compte (He Shoots, He Scores) as Dany Ross (CBC Television series). It was broadcast also on TV5 with French subtitles as Cogne et Gagne
- 1992: Armen and Bullik as police detective Tom Bullik (TV film)
- 2004: Cyberchase - Coach (Penguin tears), Doctor (A Change of Art), Octionier, vender, additional voices (The Snelfu Snafu), additional voices
