= Festival (Canadian TV series) season 5 =

Festival
- Season 5
- No. of episodes: 27

Release
- Original network: CBC
- Original release: 7 October 1964 – 30 June 1965

Season chronology
- ← Previous; Season 4 Next → Season 6

The fifth season of the Canadian television anthology series Festival broadcast on CBC Television from 7 October 1964 to 30 June 1965. Twenty-seven new episodes aired this season.

== Synopsis ==
This season features classical music from Antonio Vivaldi's Harmonic Inspiration and Johann Sebastian Bach's harpsichord and string compositions, and Eugene Istomin, Isaac Stern, and Leonard Rose debut in North America as a chamber ensemble, playing trios for piano, violin and cello by Ludwig van Beethoven and Johannes Brahms. Also in his North American debut, Soviet master pianist Sviatoslav Richter plays Intermezzo No. 5 from Fantasies by Johannes Brahms, compositions by impressionist Maurice Ravel, and Sonata No. 2 by Sergei Prokofiev. The Toronto Symphony Orchestra performs Romantic era program music in Symphonie Fantastique (1830) by Hector Berlioz conducted by Seiji Ozawa of Japan. Later works include The Planets by Gustav Holst and a piano Rhapsody on a Theme of Paganini by Sergei Rachmaninoff with the CBC Montreal Orchestra. A full episode is devoted as a portrait of the career of jazz composer Duke Ellington and his orchestra, along with jazz vocalist Joya Sherrill.

For the fifth year running Festival produced a Gilbert and Sullivan comedic opera, and this season's choice is Iolanthe. The tragic opera Rigoletto by Giuseppe Verdi is performed. Operatic vocal performances include Giacomo Puccini's love duet from Madama Butterfly, an aria from Gianni Schicchi, and a scene from Tosca featuring Metropolitan Opera soprano Renata Tebaldi, and Canadian baritone Louis Quilico. Arias by George Frideric Handel and Gioachino Rossini are performed, along with Rossini's The Venetian Regatta, Paolo Tosti's song L'ultima canzone, and Pietro Mascagni's 1901 opera Le maschere. French soprano Mathé Altéry sings selections from Oscar Strauss, and from Franz Lehár's operetta The Count of Luxembourg, along with Broadway songs from Rodgers and Hammerstein's musical Carousel, and from Lerner and Loewe's musical My Fair Lady, and songs popular at the turn of the century. Canadian contralto Maureen Forrester sings Siete canciones populares Españolas by Spanish composer Manuel de Falla, and Serenade by Franz Schubert with a choir of twelve women from the Festival Singers of Toronto. Ballets include Sylvia with music by Léo Delibes, Images of Love to music by Peter Tranchell, and Sergei Prokofiev's "drambalet" Romeo and Juliet, based on Shakespeare's play. "In Praise of Great Performers," the choreography of George Balanchine is performed by the New York City Ballet company in The Four Temperaments to music by Paul Hindemith, and Ivesiana to music by Charles Ives.

Plays this season include Henrik Ibsen's tragedy The Master Builder (1892), Bertolt Brecht's anti-war Mother Courage and Her Children (1939), Samuel Beckett's tragicomedy Waiting for Godot (1953), Ray Mathew's drama A Spring Song (1958), and Harold Pinter' menacing comedy The Birthday Party (1959). Contemporary plays include Clive Exton's The Close Prisoner, André Laurendeau's Two Terrible Women, James Hanley's, Say Nothing, and Charles E. Israel's Let Me Count the Ways. Episodes with two offerings include Max Frisch's The Furious Philipp Hotz, Ph.D. (1956) with Lewis John Carlino's Epiphany (1963), and two teleplays by William Hanley, Mrs. Daily Has a Lover and Today is Independence Day. Literary adaptations include Brian Moore's novel The Feast of Lupercal, and Isaac Bashevis Singer's novel The Magician of Lublin.

== Notable guest cast ==
In addition to individuals cast this season, organizations include the CBC Festival Orchestra, the CBC Montreal Orchestra, the Toronto Symphony Orchestra, the Festival Singers of Toronto, the Harkness Ballet Company of New York, and the New York City Ballet company.

- Sharon Acker
- William "Cat" Anderson
- Mathé Altéry
- Brenda de Banzie
- Ivor Barry
- Len Birman
- Maurice Blackburn
- Lloyd Bochner
- Michel Brault
- Bunny Briggs
- Lawrence Brown
- Geneviève Bujold
- Helen Burns
- Jackie Burroughs
- Zoe Caldwell
- Giuseppe Campora
- Len Cariou
- Harry Carney
- Barbara Chilcott
- Patricia Collins
- Guy L. Coté
- Davis Cunningham
- James Daly
- Jean Deslauriers
- Peter Donat
- John Drainie
- Duke Ellington
- Victor Feldbrill
- Maureen Forrester
- Henderson Forsythe
- Christopher Gable
- Claire Gagnier
- Gabriel Gascon
- Claude Gauthier
- Howell Glynne
- Nonnie Griffin
- Suzanne Grossmann
- Gilles Groulx
- Barbara Hamilton
- Jimmy Hamilton
- Martha Henry
- Roland Hewgill
- Donald Hewlett
- Johnny Hodges
- Marilyn Horne
- Eric House
- William Hutt
- Frances Hyland
- Elmer Iseler
- Eugene Istomin
- Claude Jutra
- Greta Kraus
- Sara Leland
- Rex Loring
- Lois Marshall
- Paul Massie
- Kay Mazzo
- Neil McCallum
- Ed McNamara
- Jolanda Meneguzzer
- Arthur Mitchell
- Francisco Monción
- Barry Morse
- Patricia Neary
- William Needles
- Boyd Neel
- David Oistrakh
- Igor Oistrakh
- Seiji Ozawa
- Gerard Parkes
- Pierre Patry
- Adrian Pecknold
- Jennifer Phipps
- Louis Quilico
- Henry Ramer
- Richard Rapp
- Kate Reid
- Sviatoslav Richter
- Leonard Rose
- Norman Rossington
- Mstislav Rostropovich
- Jan Rubeš
- Michael Sarrazin
- Suki Schorer
- Lynn Seymour
- Joya Sherrill
- Lister Sinclair
- Brett Somers
- Dorothy Spencer
- Ruth Springford
- Isaac Stern
- Sean Sullivan
- Walter Susskind
- Powys Thomas
- Franchot Tone
- Renata Tebaldi
- John Vernon
- Sandy Webster (as Alexander Webster)
- William Weslow
- Murray Westgate
- Chris Wiggins
- Patricia Wilde
- Jeremy Wilkin
- Austin Willis
- Sam Woodyard
- Theresa Wright

== Episodes ==
Notes:

- Three episodes from season four reaired this season; "Roots" on 21 October 1964, "A Very Close Family" on 24 February 1965, and "Pale Horse, Pale Rider" on 17 March 1965.
- Weeks pre-empted by other programming, including; Intertel on 23 December 1964, Hallmark Hall of Fame on 27 January 1965, NHL hockey on 10 March 1965, Camera Canada on 16 June 1965, and a special on China called The 700 Million on 4 November 1964 and its repeat airing on 30 December 1964.
- The Festival time-slot was also filled for special productions:
  - On 13 January 1965, Festival aired the National Film Board of Canada one-hour documentary Bethune produced by Donald Brittain and John Kemeny, which had debuted earlier in November 1964 at the Leipzig International Festival in East Germany.
  - On 17 February 1965, the Cariboo Country episode "The Education of Phyllistine" aired on Festival after its screening at the Montreal International Film Festival (August 7th-13th 1964). The one-hour episode was edited together from two half-hour shows, and won a Canadian Film Award.
  - On 14 April 1965, Claude Jutra's 1963 film À tout prendre aired on Festival.

No. overall	No. in season	Title	Directed by	Written by	Original release date	Ref.
105	1	"The Feast of Lupercal"	George McCowan	Novel by : Brian Moore; Adapted by : Fletcher Markle	7 October 1964	
Please add a Plot Summary here, replacing this text. For guidance, see How to write a plot summary. Episode summaries must be expressed in your own words. Do NOT submit content you find from another web site as it is plagiarism and likely a copyright violation, which Wikipedia cannot accept and will be removed or reverted. Superficially modifying copyrighted content or closely paraphrasing it, even if the source is cited, still constitutes a copyright violation. As per Television Plot Manual of Style,^{MOS:TVPLOT} summaries should be about 100 to 200 words in length, and those substantially less than 100 words are most likely to be scrutinized for possible copyright violation.
106	2	"Mrs. Daily Has a Lover"	Harvey Hart	Teleplay by : William Hanley	14 October 1964	
106	2	"Today is Independence Day"	Harvey Hart	Teleplay by : William Hanley	14 October 1964	
107	3	"Premiere"	Franz Kraemer	Brahms · Ravel · Handel · Rossini · Nin	28 October 1964	
107	3	"Premiere"	Eric Till	Music by : Prokofiev · Tranchell; Choreography by : Kenneth MacMillan	28 October 1964	
The Dean of the Royal Conservatory of Music in Toronto, Dr. Boyd Neel hosts this season's premiere concert. Part 1: In his North American television debut, Soviet pianist Sviatoslav Richter plays Johannes Brahms' Intermezzo from Fantasies, Op. 116, and Maurice Ravel's Jeux d'eau, and Alborada del gracioso. In her Canadian television debut, American mezzo-soprano opera singer Marilyn Horne sings arias by George Frideric Handel, Gioachino Rossini and Nin, with the orchestra conducted by Ernesto Barbini. Produced by Franz Kraemer. Part 2: Two principal dancers from the Royal Ballet, London, Canadian ballerina Lynn Seymour and British choreographer Christopher Gable, premiere two works by English choreographer Kenneth MacMillan, the balcony scene from Sergei Prokofiev's ballet Romeo and Juliet, and an excerpt from Images of Love set to music by Peter Tranchell. They are accompanied by the CBC Festival Orchestra directed by Victor Feldbrill, musical director of the Winnipeg Symphony Orchestra. Produced by Eric Till.
108	4	"The Close Prisoner"	Paul Almond	Play by : Clive Exton; Teleplay by : Alice Sinclair	11 November 1964	
109	5	"The Master Builder"	Eric Till	Play by : Henrik Ibsen; Adapted by : Peter Donat; Music by : Gustav Holst	18 November 1964	
Please add a Plot Summary here, replacing this text. For guidance, see How to write a plot summary and Television Plot Manual of Style.^{MOS:TVPLOT} Notes: The play is accompanied by Gustav Holst's music from the orchestral suite, The Planets. Cast: Franchot Tone, Martha Henry, Len Cariou, Hilary Vernon, Alfred Gallagher, Suzanne Grossmann, and William Needles.
110	6	"Gala of Favourites"	Unknown	Music by : Sergei Rachmaninoff · Léo Delibes; Opera by : Giacomo Puccini; Choreography by : Michel Conte	25 November 1964	
In this one-hour celebration of favourites, opera soprano Claire Gagnier portrays Butterfly, and tenor Davis Cunningham plays Pinkerton, singing the Love Duet from Act.1 of Giacomo Puccini's opera Madame Butterfly. Pianist Dale Barlett plays Rhapsody on a Theme of Paganini, Op. 43 by Sergei Rachmaninoff with the CBC Montreal Orchestra, conducted by Jean Deslauriers. Ballerina Margaret Mercier and guest artist Nicholas Polajenko from the Harkness Ballet Company of New York perform the ballet Sylvia, ou La nymphe de Diane set to music by Léo Delibes, choreographed by Michel Conte. Notes: The concert was also broadcast from Montreal; Armand Landry, supervisor of music programming for Société Radio Canada.
111	7	"Waiting for Godot"	George Bloomfield	Samuel Beckett	2 December 1964	
112	8	"Masters from Soviet Russia"	Unknown	Antonio Vivaldi · Johann Sebastian Bach	9 December 1964	
Before a live studio audience at Massey Hall, Toronto, Canadian soprano Lois Marshall introduces internationally known Soviet musicians who perform a one-hour concert, accompanied by the Toronto Symphony Orchestra, directed by Walter Susskind. Father and son violinists David Oistrakh and Igor Oistrakh, and cellist Mstislav Rostropovich play from Antonio Vivaldi's collection, L'estro armonico (The Harmonic Inspiration), specifically, Op. 3 No. 11 Double Concerto in D minor for two violins, cello and strings (RV 565). Distinguished Canadian harpsichordist Greta Kraus joins the Oistrakh's, playing Johann Sebastian Bach's Sonata in C for two violins. Two movements from J.S. Bach's Suite No. 3 in C major, BWV 1009 for unaccompanied cello is also performed.
113	9	"The Magician of Lublin"	George Bloomfield	Novel by : Isaac Bashevis Singer; Adapted by : Alvin Goldman	16 December 1964	
114	10	"The Birthday Party"	Paul Almond	Harold Pinter	6 January 1965	
115	11	"Mother Courage"	George McCowan	Play by : Bertolt Brecht; Translated by : Eric Bentley	20 January 1965	
116	12	"Rigoletto"	Unknown	Opera by : Giuseppe Verdi; Choreography by : Alan Lund	3 February 1965	
Please add a Plot Summary here, replacing this text. For guidance, see How to write a plot summary and Television Plot Manual of Style.^{MOS:TVPLOT} Cast: Louis Quilico, Giuseppe Campora, Jolanda Meneguzzer, June Genovese, and Jan Rubeš. Notes: Produced by Franz Kraemer. Music conducted by Ernesto Barbini.
117	13	"The Furious Philipp Hotz, Ph.D."	Peter Boretski	Max Frisch	10 February 1965	
117	13	"Epiphany"	Michael Sinelnikoff	Lewis John Carlino	10 February 1965	
118	14	"The Duke"	Paddy Sampson	Music by : Duke Ellington	3 March 1965	
The Duke is a one-hour portrait of the past-to-present music career of jazz pianist and composer Duke Ellington, joined by his orchestra, singer Joya Sherrill, dancer Bunny Briggs, with Byng Whittaker conducting interviews with Ellington. Musical numbers and excerpts include Soda Fountain Rag (1914), Rockin' in Rhythm (1931), Happy Go Lucky Local (1946), Jam with Sam (1951), Kinda Dukish (1960), the banquet scene from Timon of Athens (commissioned by the Stratford Shakespeare Festival, 1963), My Heritage, David Danced Before the Lord With All His Might (1965), My Mother, My Father, The Blues from his latest release, My People (1965), Far Eastern Suite (ca. 1963-4), and early versions of compositions yet to be released on his 1967 album Far East Suite, including Agra, Amad, and Bluebird of Delhi. Members of the Duke Ellington Orchestra who appear include Jimmy Hamilton (clarinet/saxophone), Harry Carney (clarinet/saxophone), Johnny Hodges (alto saxophone), Lawrence Brown (trombone), William "Cat" Anderson (trumpet), Nat Woodyard (trumpet), and Sam Woodyard (drums). Notes: Produced by Paddy Sampson with Floor Director Mark Warren, it was recorded early September 1964.
119	15	"Two Terrible Women"	Mario Prizek	Play by : André Laurendeau; Translated by : Gwethalyn Graham	24 March 1965	
120	16	"Concert Italian Style"	Unknown	Puccini · Rossini · Tosti · Mascagni	31 March 1965	
Metropolitan Opera soprano Renata Tebaldi, and Canadian baritone Louis Quilico are featured singing arias and songs by Italian composers in this one-hour program, produced by Franz Kraemer. Ms. Tebaldi performs the aria O mio babbino caro (Oh my dear Papa) from Giacomo Puccini's comic 1918 opera Gianni Schicchi, as well as La regata veneziana (The Venetian Regatta) by Gioachino Rossini. Mr. Quilico performs Paolo Tosti's song L'ultima canzone, and the monologue from Puccini's 1918 one-act opera Il tabarro (The Cloak). Tebaldi and Quilico are highlighted together in a staged scene from Act II of Puccini's 1900 opera Tosca. Also performed is Pietro Mascagni's 1901 opera Le maschere (The Mask). The concert includes an Overture, conducted by Ernesto Barbini.
121	17	"Cine Boom"	Robert Russel, Claude Jutra	Unknown	7 April 1965	
This one-hour cinéma vérité by producer Robert Russel about feature film-making in Montreal is presented by Festival executive producer Robert Allen. Director Claude Jutra worked with Russell to prepare the program, and serves as guide to viewers. Through informal interviews and film clips, the film-making work, attitudes and approach of five directors are examined. The directors and their films include: Claude Jutra's 1963 drama À tout prendre (All Things Considered, aka Take It All in the United States), Michel Brault's 1963 ethnofiction documentary Pour la suite du monde (So That the World May Go On), Gilles Groulx's 1964 drama Le chat dans le sac (The Cat in the Bag), Pierre Patry's 1964 drama Trouble fête (Trouble Maker) and his 1965 drama Caïn - Les marcheurs de la nuit (The Night Walkers), and; Guy L. Coté's 1960 documentary short, Roughnecks: The Story of Oil Drillers.; Also appearing are actors Geneviève Bujold, Claude Gauthier, Barbara Ulrich, Claude Godbout, and music composer Maurice Blackburn.
122	18	"Let Me Count the Ways"	Paul Almond	Charles Israel	21 April 1965	
123	19	"Iolanthe"	Norman Campbell	Gilbert and Sullivan	28 April 1965	
124	20	"Say Nothing"	Peter Boretski	Play by : James Hanley; Adapted by : William Emms	5 May 1965	
125	21	"A Spring Song in Six Scenes"	Paul Almond	Ray Mathew	12 May 1965	
126	22	"Bernard Shaw: Who the Devil Was He?"	Vincent Tovell	Autobiography by : George Bernard Shaw; Teleplay by : Lister Sinclair	19 May 1965	
Narrated by Lister Sinclair, this one-hour production by Vincent Tovell is a look at Irish dramatist, Fabian socialist, and Dublin-born George Bernard Shaw, focusing on his formative years and struggle for recognition, from his so-named "devil of a childhood" to his fame as a playwright. Shot in Dublin, London, and Shaw's hometown of Ayot St. Lawrence, England, the program combines film sequences, newsreel clips, and still photographs to illustrate Shaw's autobiographical writings on his life and work. Shaw's writings are spoken by Barry Morse, with appearances by Diana Maddox, Alexander Webster, and Gillie Fenwick.
127	23	"The Season of Love"	Unknown	Unknown	26 May 1965	
In this one-hour bilingual concert, love songs are performed in French and English, featuring Parisian soprano Mathé Altéry and Montreal singer Aime Major, with music from the turn of the century such as Frou-Frou, Fascination, Petite Maison Grise (Little Grey Home in the West), and Reviens (Come Back). Ms. Altéry performs numbers from Franz Lehár's operetta The Count of Luxembourg, and the Oscar Strauss song Rêve de vasle (A Waltz Dream). Altéry is accompanied by Montreal actor Gabriel Gascon bridging dialogue with the music. Ms. Altéry is joined by Montreal singer Yolande Guérard, performing songs from Rodgers and Hammerstein's Broadway musical Carousel, and Lerner and Loewe's musical My Fair Lady, including I Could Have Danced All Night. The finale includes the whole cast in a "pot-pourri" of music heard earlier. Notes: Personnel involved in this production include Pierre Morin, Armand Landry, Neil Chotem, and Michel Conte.
128	24	"Balanchine - In Praise of Great Performers"	Pierre Morin	Music by : Paul Hindemith · Charles Ives; Choreography by : George Balanchine	2 June 1965	
This one-hour production is the first in a series of four programs "In Praise of Great Performers." Produced by Pierre Morin, this presentation focuses on the works of choreographer George Balanchine, director of the New York City Ballet company. Dancers from the company perform two abstract ballets choreographed by Balanchine, The Four Temperaments set to the music of Paul Hindemith, and Ivesiana set to music by Charles Ives. Dancers include William Weslow, Carol Sumner, Earle Sieveling, Marnee Morris, Kay Mazzo, Bettuane Sills, Richard Rapp, Sara Leland, Francisco Monción, Deni Lamont, Ramon Segarra, Suki Schorer, Arthur Mitchell, Patricia Neary, Anthony Blum, and Patricia Wilde. Notes: Production and crew include Franz Kreamer, Leon Baldwin (technical producer), Gordon Boelzner (piano), Calvin Sieb (violin), and Robert Irving (musical conductor). Produced for Société Radio Canada and telecast on L'Heure du concert.
129	25	"Meet Seiji Ozawa - In Praise of Great Performers"	Unknown	Hector Berlioz	9 June 1965	
Produced by Franz Kraemer, in a second hour "In Praise of Great Performers" we meet Seiji Ozawa of Japan who will lead the Toronto Symphony Orchestra as its new conductor for the next three years. Ozawa and the orchestra rehearse before performing Symphonie Fantastique an Episode in the Life of an Artist … in Five Sections (Op. 14). It is a programmatic symphony written by Hector Berlioz in 1830, complete with semi-autobiographical concert programme notes that allude to the story within the aforementioned Episode in the Life. Notes: Technical producer, Victor Ferry. Concert master, Hyman Goodman.
130	26	"Music In Camera - In Praise of Great Performers"	Vincent Tovell	Ludwig van Beethoven · Johannes Brahms	23 June 1965	
This third hour "In Praise of Great Performers" features three distinguished soloists who make their North American debut as a The Stern-Istomin-Rose Trio; violinist Isaac Stern, pianist Eugene Istomin, and cellist Leonard Rose. For this permance, they play chamber music Trios which were scored by the composers for piano, violin and cello: Trio No. 3 in C Minor, Op. 1 by Ludwig van Beethoven, and Trio No. 2 in C Major, Op. 87 by Johannes Brahms. Notes: Executive producer, Franz Kraemer. Technical producer, Joe Parkinson.
131	27	"Ricter and Forrester - In Praise of Great Performers"	Unknown	Schubert · Brahms · Ravel · Prokofiev	30 June 1965	
Introduced by Rex Loring and produced by Franz Kraemer, the last of four programs "In Praise of Great Performers" focuses on Canadian contralto Maureen Forrester and Russian pianist Sviatoslav Richter. Forrester sings Siete canciones populares Españolas (Seven Spanish Folksongs) for Soprano and Piano by Spanish composer Manuel de Falla, accompanied by pianist John Newmark. Forrester performs Serenade, Opus 135 (D 920) by Franz Schubert with a choir of twelve women of the Festival Singers of Toronto under the direction of its founder, Elmer Iseler. Richter plays Intermezzo No. 5 in E minor, Andante con grazia ed intimissimo sentimento from Fantasies, Op. 116 by Johannes Brahms, two works by impressionist Maurice Ravel, his composistion for solo piano Jeux d'eau and his piano suite Alborada del gracioso, and the Piano Sonata No. 2 in D Minor, Op. 14 by Sergei Prokofiev. Notes: Technical producer, Victor Ferry. This episode reaired in season six.

Previous: Season 4	List of Festival episodes	Succeeded by Season 6
