= Medea (play) =

Ancient Greek tragedy by Euripides

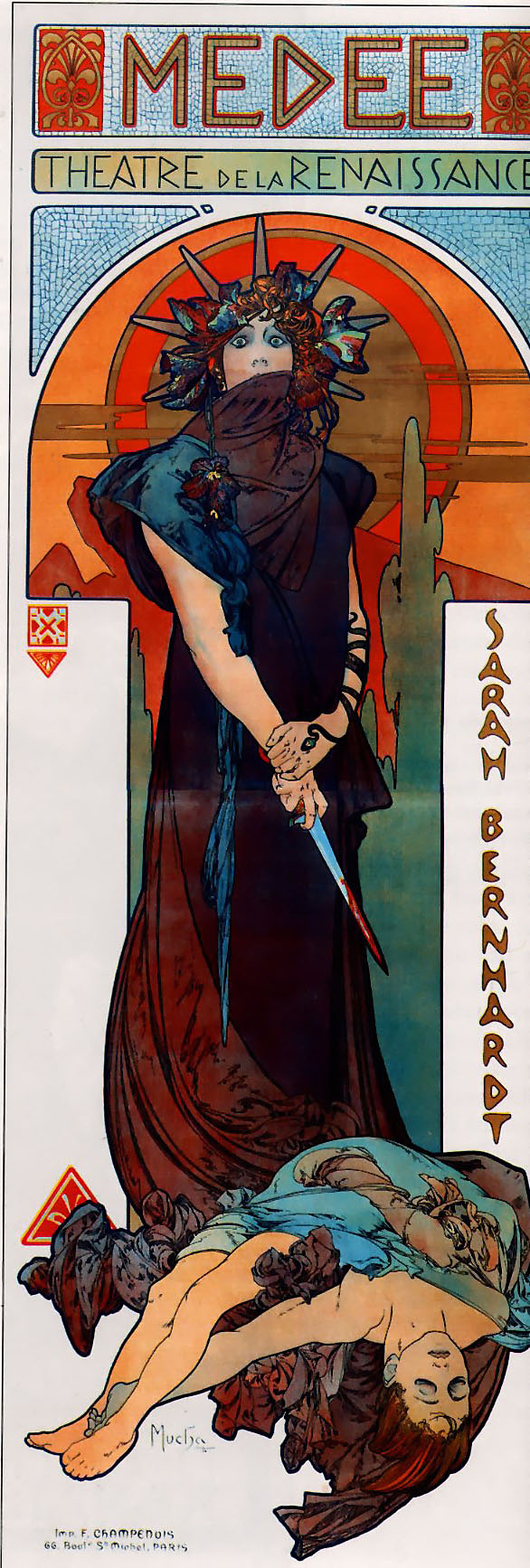
- Poster by Alfons Mucha for performance by Sarah Bernhardt in Medée at the Théâtre de la Renaissance, Paris (1898)
- Original language: Ancient Greek
- Written by: Euripides
- Chorus: Corinthian Women
- Characters: Medea; Nurse; Tutor; Aegeus; Creon; Jason; Messenger; Medea's two children
- Genre: Tragedy
- Setting: Before Medea's house in Corinth

Premiere
- Date: 431 BC
- Place: Athens

Medea (Ancient Greek: Μήδεια, Mēdeia) is a tragedy based on a myth, written by the ancient Greek playwright Euripides. It was first performed in 431 BC as part of a trilogy, the other plays of which have not survived. Its plot centers on the actions of Medea, a former princess of the kingdom of Colchis and the wife of Jason. She finds her position in the world threatened as Jason leaves her for a princess of Corinth and takes vengeance on him by murdering his new wife, his new father-in-law, and her own two sons. She then escapes to Athens to start a new life.

Euripides's play has been retold and reinterpreted for centuries. Playwrights across the world have explored it in a variety of ways, offering political, psychoanalytical, feminist, and many other original readings of Medea, Jason, and the core themes of the play.

Medea, along with three other plays, (Note: Philoctetes, Dictys, and Theristai, all three of which are now lost) earned Euripides third prize in the City Dionysia. Some believe that this indicates a poor reception, but "the competition that year was extraordinarily keen"; Sophocles, often winning first prize, came second. The play was initially rediscovered with Rome's Augustan drama, and then again in the 16th century. It has remained part of the tragedic repertoire, becoming a classic of the Western canon and the most frequently performed Greek tragedy in the 20th century. It experienced renewed interest in the feminist movement of the late 20th century, often being interpreted as a nuanced and sympathetic portrayal of Medea's struggle to take charge of her own life in a male-dominated world.

== History ==
Medea was first performed in 431 BC at the City Dionysia festival. Here every year, three tragedians competed against each other, each writing a tetralogy of three tragedies and a satyr play (alongside Medea were Philoctetes, Dictys and the satyr play Theristai). In 431 the competition was among Euphorion (the son of famed playwright Aeschylus), Sophocles (Euripides's main rival) and Euripides. Euphorion won, and Euripides placed third (and last). Medea has survived the transplants of culture and time and continues to captivate audiences with its riveting power. The play's influence can be seen in the works of later playwrights, such as William Shakespeare.

While Medea is considered one of the great plays of the Western canon, Euripides's place in the competition suggests that his first audience might not have responded so favorably. A scholium to line 264 of the play suggests that Medea's children were traditionally killed by the Corinthians after her escape; so Euripides's apparent invention of the filicide might have offended, as his first treatment of the Hippolytus myth did. That Euripides and others took liberties with Medea's story may be inferred from the 1st-century-BC historian Diodorus Siculus: "Speaking generally, it is because of the desire of the tragic poets for the marvellous that so varied and inconsistent an account of Medea has been given out." A common legend claimed that Euripides put the blame on Medea because the Corinthians had bribed him with a sum of five talents.

In the 4th century BC, South-Italian vase painting offers a number of Medea representations that are connected to Euripides's play — the most famous is a krater in Munich. However, these representations always differ considerably from the plots of the play or are too general to support any direct link to Euripides's play. But the violent and powerful character of Medea, and her double nature — both loving and destructive — became a standard for later periods of antiquity. Medea has been adapted into numerous forms of media, including operas, films, and novels.

With the text's rediscovery in 1st-century Rome (the play was adapted by the tragedians Ennius, Lucius Accius, Ovid, Seneca the Younger and Hosidius Geta, among others), again in 16th-century Europe, and the development of modern literary criticism, Medea has provoked multifarious reactions.

== Form and themes ==
The form of the play differs from many other Greek tragedies by its simplicity; most scenes involve only Medea, one other character, and The Chorus, representing the women of Corinth. These simple encounters highlight Medea's skill and determination in manipulating powerful male figures. The play is also the only Greek tragedy in which a kin-killer makes it unpunished to the end of the play, and the only tragedy about child-killing in which the deed is performed in cold blood, as opposed to in a state of temporary madness. Medea's rebellion shakes the world as she tells of her history, shedding light on the actions that ultimately lead to her denigration and dethronement. Euripides depicts Medea as a witch and a devourer of men and children, rather than as a wife and mother wronged.

Euripides' characterization of Medea exhibits the inner emotions of passion, love, and vengeance. According to classics scholar Fiona Macintosh, "[Medea] has successfully negotiated her path through very diverse cultural and political contexts: either by being radically recast as 'exemplary' mother and wife, or by being seen as a proto-feminist wrongly abandoned by a treacherous husband." Feminist readings have interpreted the play as either a sympathetic exploration of the disadvantages of being a woman in a patriarchal society, or as an expression of misogynist attitudes. In conflict with this sympathetic undertone (or reinforcing a more negative reading) is Medea's barbarian identity, which some argue might antagonize a 5th-century BC Greek audience.

It can be argued that in the play Euripides portrays Medea as an enraged woman who kills her children to get revenge on her husband Jason because of his betrayal of their marriage. Medea is often cited as an example of the "madwoman in the attic" trope, in which women who defy societal norms are portrayed as mentally unstable. A competing interpretation is that Medea kills her children because she cares for them and worries about their well-being; once she commits to her plan to kill Creon and Jason's new bride, she knows her children are in danger of being murdered. This is not a paranoid fantasy; at this time in myth and history, helping one's friends and hurting one's enemies was considered a virtue. Thus, by their code of ethics, the Corinthians would do right to avenge their king and princess. (In another version of the myth, the people of Corinth kill her children to avenge the deaths of Creon and his daughter Glauce.) Conversely, a focus on Medea's rage leads to the interpretation that "Medea becomes the personification of vengeance, with her humanity 'mortified' and 'sloughed off'" (Cowherd, 129). Medea's heritage places her in a position more typically reserved for males. Hers is the power of the sun, appropriately symbolized by her great radiance, tremendous heat and boundless passion. In this view Medea is inhuman and her suffering is self-inflicted, just as Jason argues in his debate with her. And yet, if we see events through Medea's eyes, we view a wife intent on vengeance, and a mother concerned about her children's safety and quality of life. Thus, Medea as a wife kills Creon and Glauce in the act of vengeance, and Medea as a mother thinks her children will be better off killed by her hand than left to suffer at the hands of an enemy intent on vengeance.

Medea is often described as having a "heroic temper" and a strong motivation to avoid the laughter of her enemies, "even at the cost of decisions that contradict self-interest, personal safety, or strongly held moral beliefs". Although some may say that her motive was jealousy over Jason’s new bride, her pride also made her unwilling to let her enemies, in this case Jason and his new wife, look down on her. Medea stated that "her enemies [would] cause her pain and rejoice," and that her priority was to "avoid her enemies’ derision." Although the murder of her children would cause her pain, Medea’s temperament caused her to prioritize Jason’s unhappiness over anything else.

== Story ==
Medea is centered on Medea's calculated desire for revenge against her unfaithful husband. Medea is of divine descent and has the gift of prophecy. She married Jason and used her magic powers and advice to help him find and retrieve the golden fleece. The play is set in Corinth some time after Jason's quest for the Golden Fleece, where he met Medea. The play begins with Medea in a blind rage towards Jason for arranging to marry Glauce, the daughter of king Creon. The nurse, overhearing Medea's grief, fears what she might do to herself or her children.

Creon, in anticipation of Medea's wrath, arrives and reveals his plans to send her into exile. Crouching at Creon's feet, Medea begs him in the name of her children to allow her one day's delay. At this Creon is moved and grants to her one more day in Corinth. Medea's unexpected power of persuasion or even of fascination lies in her change of attitude: instead of preaching to Creon about the unpopularity of the sophoi she plays the role of a desperate mother, needing one day to prepare for exile. Medea is aware of the humiliating quality of this tactic, but she justifies it on the grounds of a gain and of her need to remain in Corinth: "Do you think that I would ever have flattered that man unless I had some gain to make or some device to execute? I wouldn't have even spoken or touched him with my hands". In the next scene Jason arrives to explain his rationale for his apparent betrayal. He explains that he could not pass up the opportunity to marry a royal princess, as Medea is only a barbarian woman, but hopes to someday join the two families and keep Medea as his mistress. Medea, and the chorus of Corinthian women, do not believe him. She reminds him that she left her own people for him ("I rescued you [...] I betrayed both my father and my house [...] now where should I go?"), and that she saved him and slew the dragon. Jason promises to support her after his new marriage ("If you wish me to give you or the children extra money for your trip into exile, tell me; I'm ready to give it with a lavish hand"), but Medea spurns him: "Go on, play the bridegroom! Perhaps [...] you've made a match you'll one day have cause to lament."

In the following scene Medea encounters Aegeus, king of Athens. He reveals to her that despite his marriage he is still without children. He visited the oracle who merely told him that he was instructed "not to unstop the wineskin's neck". Medea relays her current situation to him and begs for Aegeus to let her stay in Athens if she gives him drugs to end his infertility. Aegeus, unaware of Medea's plans for revenge, agrees.

Medea then returns to plotting the murders of Glauce and Creon. She decides to poison some golden robes (a family heirloom and gift from the sun god Helios, her grandfather) and a coronet, in hopes that the bride will not be able to resist wearing them, and consequently be poisoned. Medea resolves to kill her own children as well, not because the children have done anything wrong, but because she feels it is the best way to hurt Jason. She calls for Jason once more and, in an elaborate ruse, apologizes to him for overreacting to his decision to marry Glauce. When Jason appears fully convinced that she regrets her actions, Medea begins to cry in mourning of the exile. She convinces Jason to allow their two sons to give gifts to Glauce in hopes that Creon will lift the exile against the children. Eventually Jason agrees.

Forgive what I said in anger! I will yield to the decree, and only beg one favor, that my children may stay. They shall take to the princess a costly robe and a golden crown, and pray for her protection.

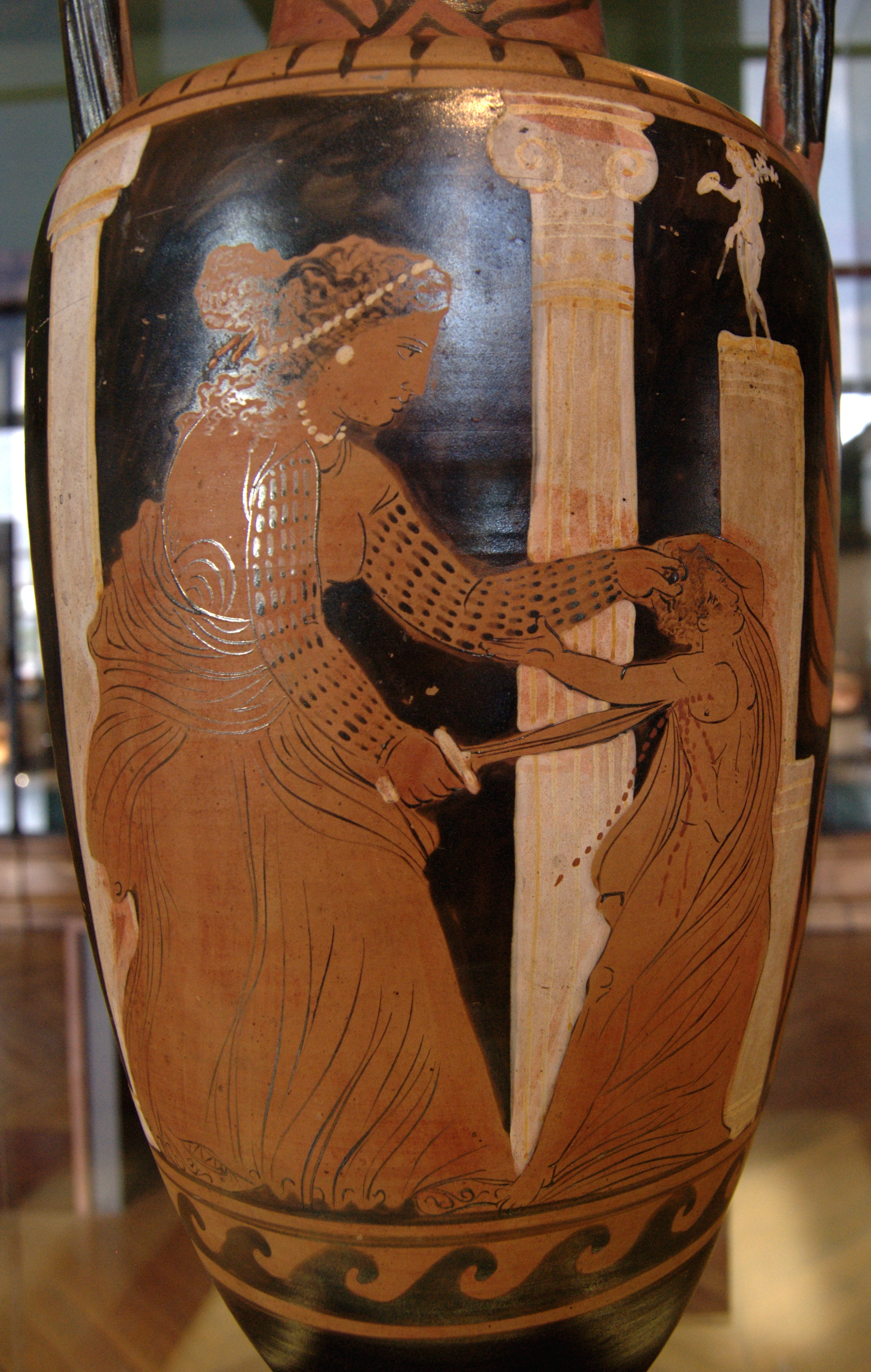
Medea kills her son, Campanian red-figure amphora, c. 330 BC, Louvre (K 300).

In the next scene a messenger recounts Glauce and Creon's deaths. When the children arrived with the robes and coronet, Glauce gleefully put them on and went to find her father. The poison overtook her and she fell to the floor, dying horribly and painfully. Creon clutched her tightly as he tried to save her and, by coming in contact with the robes and coronet, was poisoned and died as well.

Alas! The bride had died in horrible agony; for no sooner had she put on Medea's gifts than a devouring poison consumed her limbs as with fire, and in his endeavor to save his daughter the old father died too.

While Medea is pleased with her current success she decides to take it one step further. Since Jason brought shame upon her by trying to start a new family, Medea resolves to destroy the family he was willing to give up by killing their sons. Medea does have a moment of hesitation when she considers the pain that her children's deaths will put her through. However, she steels her resolve to cause Jason the most pain possible and rushes offstage with a knife to kill her children. Determined to stop Medea, the chorus runs after her only to hear the children scream. Jason then rushes onto the scene to confront Medea about murdering Creon and Glauce, and he quickly discovers that his children have been killed as well. Medea then appears above the stage with the bodies of her children in a chariot given to her by the sun god Helios. When this play was put on, this scene was accomplished using the mechane device usually reserved for the appearance of a god or goddess. She confronts Jason, reveling in his pain at being unable to ever hold his children again:

I do not leave my children's bodies with thee; I take them with me that I may bury them in Hera's precinct. And for thee, who didst me all that evil, I prophesy an evil doom.

Although Jason calls Medea most hateful to gods and men, the fact that the chariot is given to her by Helios indicates that she still has the gods on her side. As Bernard Knox points out, Medea's last scene with concluding appearances parallels that of a number of indisputably divine beings in other plays by Euripides. Just like these gods, Medea "interrupts and puts a stop to the violent action of the human being on the lower level, … justifies her savage revenge on the grounds that she has been treated with disrespect and mockery, … takes measures and gives orders for the burial of the dead, prophesies the future," and "announces the foundation of a cult."

She then escapes to Athens in the divine chariot. The chorus is left contemplating the will of Zeus in Medea's actions:

Manifold are thy shapings, Providence! / Many a hopeless matter gods arrange / What we expected never came to pass / What we did not expect the gods brought to bear / So have things gone, this whole experience through!

This deliberate murder of her children by Medea appears to be Euripides' invention, although some scholars believe Neophron created this alternate tradition. Her filicide would go on to become the standard for later writers. Pausanias, writing in the late 2nd century AD, records five different versions of what happened to Medea's children after reporting that he has seen a monument for them while traveling in Corinth.

== Modern productions and adaptations ==
=== Theatre ===
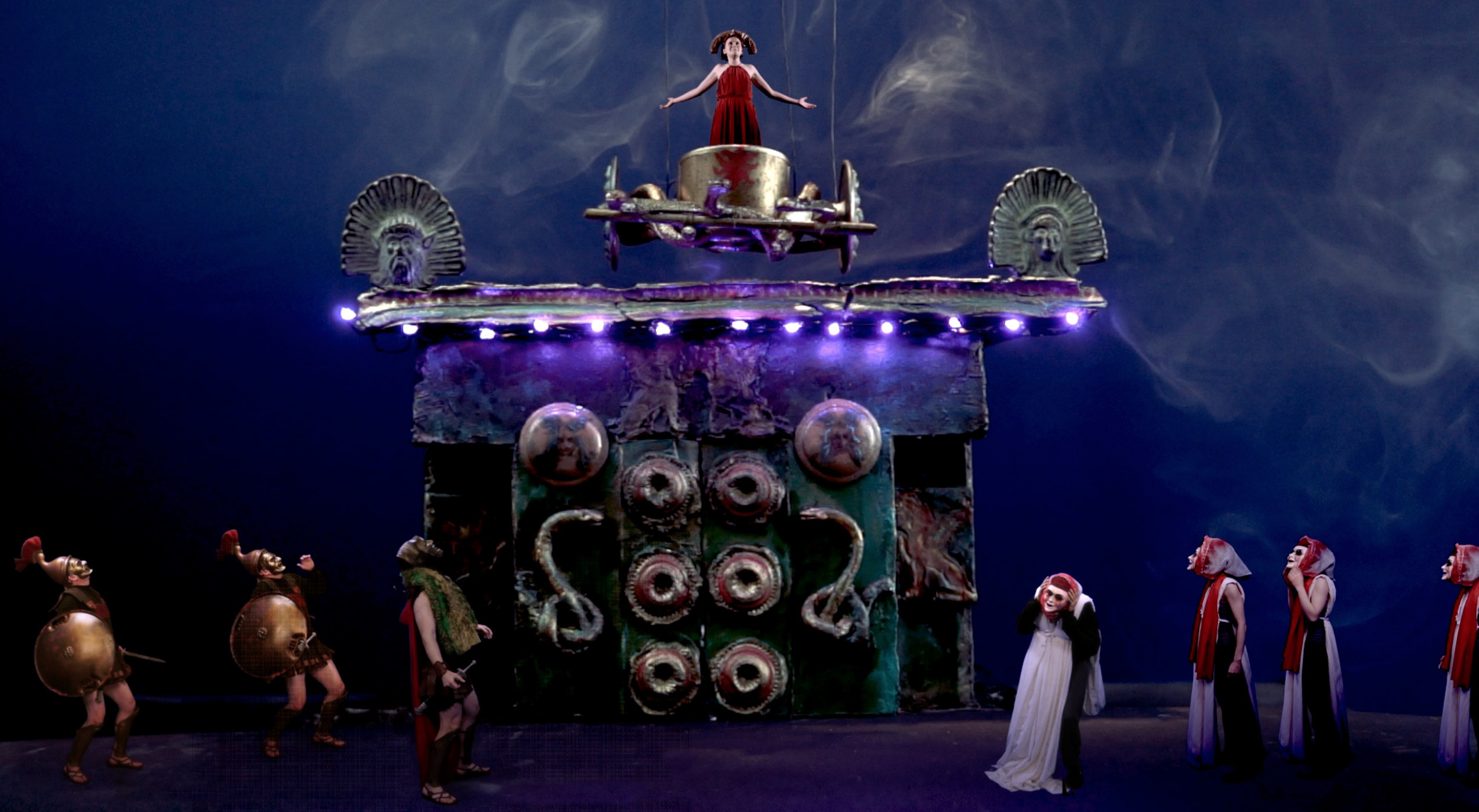
Olivia Sutherland stars in MacMillan Films' Medea

- Catulle Mendès adapted Medea into his play Medée in 1898, in three acts and in verse. Alfons Mucha drew a poster for a performance of this play starring Sarah Bernhardt.
- Jean Anouilh adapted the Medea story in his French drama Médée in 1946.
- Robinson Jeffers adapted Medea into a hit Broadway play in 1947, in a famous production starring Judith Anderson, the first of three actresses to win a Tony Award for the role. It was directed by John Gielgud, who co-starred as Jason. Medea opened on Broadway at the National Theatre on 20 October 1947, transferred to the Royale Theatre on 15 December, and closed on 15 May 1948, after 214 performances. At the 2nd Tony Awards on 28 March 1948, Judith Anderson shared (with Katharine Cornell and Jessica Tandy) the Award for Best Actress in a Play. Another staging, produced and directed by Guthrie McClintic at the City Center, premiered on 2 May 1949, and closed, after 16 performances, on 21 May. A staging in 1982, at the Cort Theatre, brought a Tony win for Zoe Caldwell, who played Medea, and a Best Featured Actress in a Play nomination for Judith Anderson as Nurse. With a subsequent Tony win for Diana Rigg in 1994, the play holds the American Theatre Wing's Tony Award record for most wins for the same female lead character in a play.
- Ben Bagley's Shoestring Revue performed a musical parody off-Broadway in the 1950s which was later issued on an LP and a CD, and was revived in 1995. The same plot points take place, but Medea in Disneyland is a parody, in that it takes place in a Walt Disney animated cartoon.
- Canada's Stratford Festival staged an adaptation of Medea by Larry Fineberg in 1978, which starred Patricia Idlette in the title role.

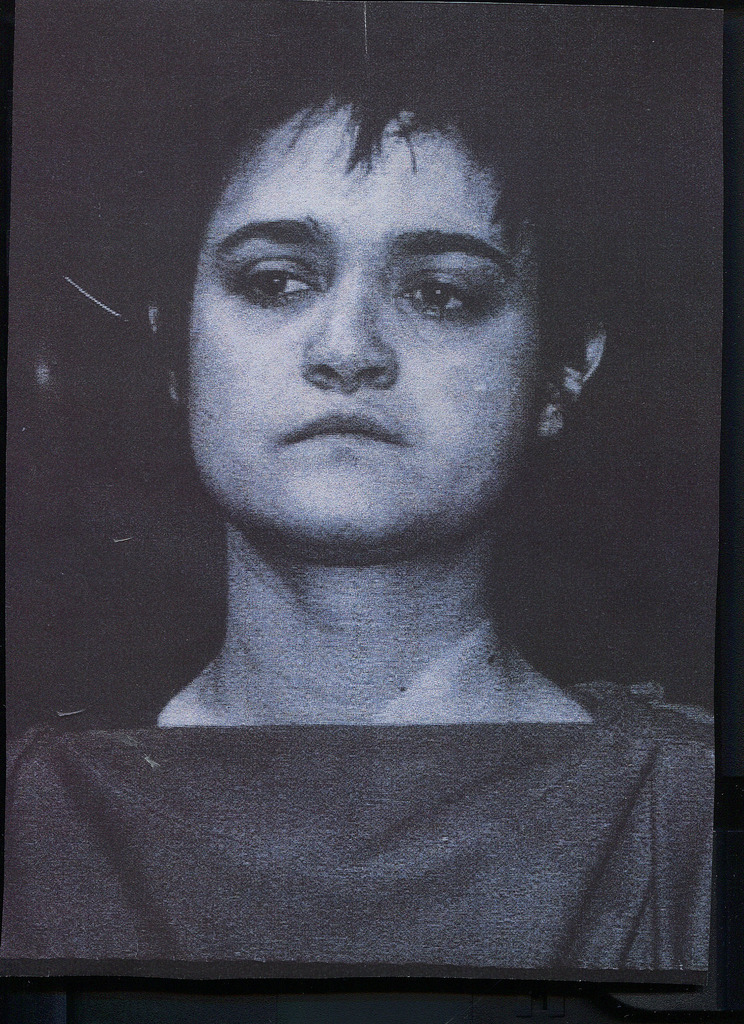
Angelique Rockas as Medea, Theatro Technis directed by George Eugeniou

- Yukio Ninagawa staged a production called Ohjo Media (王女メディア) in 1978, followed by a second version in 2005.
- In 1982, George Eugeniou at Theatro Technis London directed Medea as a barefooted unwanted refugee played with "fierce agility" and "dangerous passions" by Angelique Rockas.
- In 1983, kabuki Master Shozo Sato created Kabuki Medea uniting Euripides' play and classical Kabuki storytelling and presentation. It debuted at Wisdom Bridge Theater in Chicago.
- The 1990 play Pecong, by Steve Carter, is a retelling of Medea set on a fictional Caribbean island around the turn of the 20th century
- The play was staged at the Wyndham's Theatre in London's West End, in a translation by Alistair Elliot. The production opened on 19 October 1993.
- Chrysanthos Mentis Bostantzoglou makes a parody of this tragedy in his comedy Medea (1993).
- A 1993 dance-theatre retelling of the Medea myth was produced by Edafos Dance Theatre, directed by avant-garde stage director and choreographer Dimitris Papaioannou.
- John Fisher wrote a camp musical version of Medea entitled Medea the Musical that re-interpreted the play in light of gay culture. The production was first staged in 1994 in Berkeley, California.
- Christopher Durang and Wendy Wasserstein co-wrote a sketch version for the Juilliard School's Drama division 25th Anniversary. It premiered 25 April 1994, at the Juilliard Theater, New York City.
- In November 1997 National Theatre of Greece launched a worldwide tour of Medea, a critically acclaimed production directed by Nikaiti Kontouri, starring Karyofyllia Karambeti as Medea, Kostas Triantafyllopoulos as Creon and Lazaros Georgakopoulos as Jason. The tour included performances in France, Australia, Israel, Portugal, United States, Canada, Turkey, Bulgaria, China and Japan and lasted almost two years, until July 1999. The play opened in the United States at Shubert Theatre in Boston (18 and 19 September 1998) and then continued at City Center Theatre in Manhattan, New York City (23 to 27 September 1998), receiving a very positive review from The New York Times.
- Neil LaBute wrote Medea Redux, a modern retelling, first performed in 1999 starring Calista Flockhart, as part of his one-act trilogy entitled Bash: Latter-Day Plays. In this version, the main character is seduced by her middle-school teacher. He abandons her, and she kills their child out of revenge.
- Michael John LaChiusa created a Broadway musical adaptation work for Audra McDonald entitled Marie Christine in 1999. McDonald portrayed the title role, and the show was set in 1890s New Orleans and Chicago.
- Liz Lochhead's Medea previewed at the Old Fruitmarket, Glasgow as part of Theatre Babel's Greeks in 2000 before the Edinburgh Fringe and national tour. "What Lochhead does is to recast MEDEA as an episode-ancient but new, cosmic yet agonisingly familiar- in a sex war which is recognisable to every woman, and most of the men, in the theatre", wrote The Scotsman.
- In 2000, Wesley Enoch wrote and directed a modern adaptation titled Black Medea, which was first produced by Sydney Theatre Company's Blueprint at the Wharf 2 Theatre, Sydney, on 19 August 2000. Nathan Ramsay played the part of Jason, Tessa Rose played Medea, and Justine Saunders played the Chorus. Medea is re-characterised as an indigenous woman transported from her homeland to the city and about to be abandoned by her abusive social-climbing husband.
- Tom Lanoye (2001) used the story of Medea to bring up modern problems (such as migration and man vs. woman), resulting in a modernized version of Medea. His version also aims to analyze ideas such as the love that develops from the initial passion, problems in the marriage, and the "final hour" of the love between Jason and Medea.
- Roger Kirby's 2004 adaptation of the play, Medea in Jerusalem, was set in modern day Israel, and featured an Israeli-Jewish Jason and a Palestinian Medea who opts to turn her children into suicide bombers after being divorced by Jason. It premiered at the Rattlestick Playwrights Theatre in New York City.
- Kristina Leach adapted the story for her play The Medea Project, which had its world premiere at the Hunger Artists Theatre Company in 2004 and placed the story in a modern-day setting.
- Peter Stein directed Medea in Epidaurus 2005.
- Irish playwright Marina Carr's By the Bog of Cats is a modern re-telling of Euripides' Medea.
- In November 2008, Theatre Arcadia, under the direction of Katerina Paliou, staged Medea at the Bibliotheca Alexandrina (University of Alexandria, Egypt). The production was noted (by Nehad Selaiha of the weekly Al-Ahram) not only for its unexpected change of plot at the very end but also for its chorus of one hundred who alternated their speech between Arabic and English. The translation used was that of George Theodoridis.
- US Latina playwright Caridad Svich's 2009 play Wreckage, which premiered at Crowded Fire Theatre in San Francisco, tells the story of Medea from the sons' point of view, in the afterlife.
- Paperstrangers Performance Group toured a critically acclaimed production of Medea directed by Michael Burke to U.S. Fringe Festivals in 2009 and 2010.
- Bart Lee's interpretation of Medea, renamed Medea, My Dear, was performed in Surrey and later toured the south of England from 2010 to 2011.
- Luis Alfaro's re-imagining of Medea, Mojada, world premiered at Victory Gardens Theater in 2013.
- Theatre Lab's production, by Greek director Anastasia Revi, opened at The Riverside Studios, London, on 5 March 2014.
- The Hungry Woman: A Mexican Medea by Cherríe Moraga takes elements of Medea and of other works.
- 14 July – 4 September 2014 London Royal National Theatre staging of Euripides in a new version by Ben Power, starring Helen McCrory as Medea, directed by Carrie Cracknell, music by Will Gregory and Alison Goldfrapp.
- 25 September – 14 November 2015 London Almeida Theatre a new adaptation by Rachel Cusk, starring Kate Fleetwood as Medea, directed by Rupert Goold.
- 17 February – 6 March 2016 in Austin at the Long Center for the Performing Arts starring Franchelle Stewart Dorn as Medea and directed by Ann Ciccolella.
- May 2016 – MacMillan Films released a full staging of the original Medea which was staged for camera. The DVD release shows the entire play. complete with the Aegis scenes, choral odes and triumphant ending. Directed by James Thomas and starring Olivia Sutherland, the staging features Peter Arnott's critically acclaimed translation.
- Chico Buarque and Paulo Pontes, Gota d'Água (musical play set in 1970s Rio de Janeiro, based on Euripides, 1975). Several times revived, including a 2016/2017 production starring Laila Garin (celebrated for her title role in the highly regarded musical biography of Elis Regina, staged in Brasil in 2015).
- February 2017: the play was staged in South Korea, directed by Hungarian theatre director Róbert Alföldi, with Lee Hye-young in the titular role.

=== Film ===
- Pier Paolo Pasolini adapted the legend into a movie of the same name in 1969 starring Maria Callas as Medea
- In the 1983 film Storia di Piera by Marco Ferreri, Isabelle Huppert as the protagonist learns the part of Medea at school and plays it when she is an adult actress.
- Asian-American filmmaker Michael Justin Lee reinterpreted the story into a noir short film set in modern-day America starring Amy Gordon as Medea. (2018)

=== Television ===
- Australian actress Zoe Caldwell's performance in the 1982 Broadway adaptation of the Jeffers' script was recorded for broadcast on the PBS series Kennedy Center Tonight.
- Lars von Trier made a version for television in 1988, based on the script adaptation by Carl Theodor Dreyer.
- Theo van Gogh directed a miniseries version that aired 2005, the year following his murder.
- OedipusEnders, a documentary broadcast on BBC Radio 4 on 13 April 2010, discussed similarities between soap opera and Greek theatre. One interviewee revealed that the writers for the ITV police drama series The Bill had consciously and directly drawn on Medea in writing an episode for the series.
- Playwright Mike Bartlett was inspired to create a modern-day suburban Medea after adapting the Euripides play for a theatre production in 2012. Bartlett's 2015–2017 BBC1 miniseries Doctor Foster follows the structure of the Greek tragedy. A Korean remake of the series, The World of the Married, became the highest-rated cable drama in Korean history, with its final episode reaching a nationwide rating of 28.371%.

== English translations ==
- Robert Potter, 1781 - verse: full text
- Michael Wodhull, 1782 – verse
- Edward P. Coleridge, 1891 – prose: full text
- Theodore Alois Buckley, 1892 – prose: full text
- Gilbert Murray, 1912 – verse: full text
- Arthur S. Way, 1912 – verse
- F. L. Lucas, 1924 – verse
- Augustus T. Murray, 1931 – prose
- Countee Cullen, 1935
- Moses Hadas and John McLean, 1936 – prose
- R. C. Trevelyan, 1939 – verse
- Rex Warner, 1944 – verse
- Robinson Jeffers, 1946 – verse
- Ray Mathew, 1953 – verse
- Peter D. Arnott, 1961 – verse
- Philip Vellacott, 1963
- Rush Rehm, 1973 - prose
- John Davie, 1996
- James Morwood, 1997 – prose
- Paul Roche, 1998 – verse
- Ruby Blondell, 1999 – verse
- George Theodoridis, 2004 – prose: full text
- Stephen Esposito, 2004 – verse
- Joseph Goodrich, 2005 – verse: full text
- Graham Kirby, 2006 – verse (The Bloomsbury Theatre)
- Diane Arnson Svarlien, 2008 – verse
- Robin Robertson, 2008 – verse
- J. Michael Walton, 2008 – prose
- Ian C. Johnston, 2008 – verse: full text
- Tom Paulin, 2010 - full text
- Judith Mossman (classicist), 2011 – prose
- Brian Vinero, 2012 – rhymed verse: full text
- Mike Bartlett, 2012 – play
- Diane Rayor, 2013
- David Stuttard, 2014 – prose
- Alan Chriztopher R. Aranza, 2015 – prose
- Rachel Kitzinger, 2016 – verse
- Charles Martin, 2019
- Dr. Richard W. Swanson, 2020 – prose
- Michael Ewans, 2022 – verse
