= Op. 116 =

In music, Op. 116 stands for Opus number 116. Compositions that are assigned this number include:

- Brahms – Fantasies, Op. 116
- Prokofiev – Ivan the Terrible
- Schumann – Der Königssohn (Uhland), for solos, chorus and orchestra
