= Marie Denise Pelletier =

Canadian singer (born 1960)

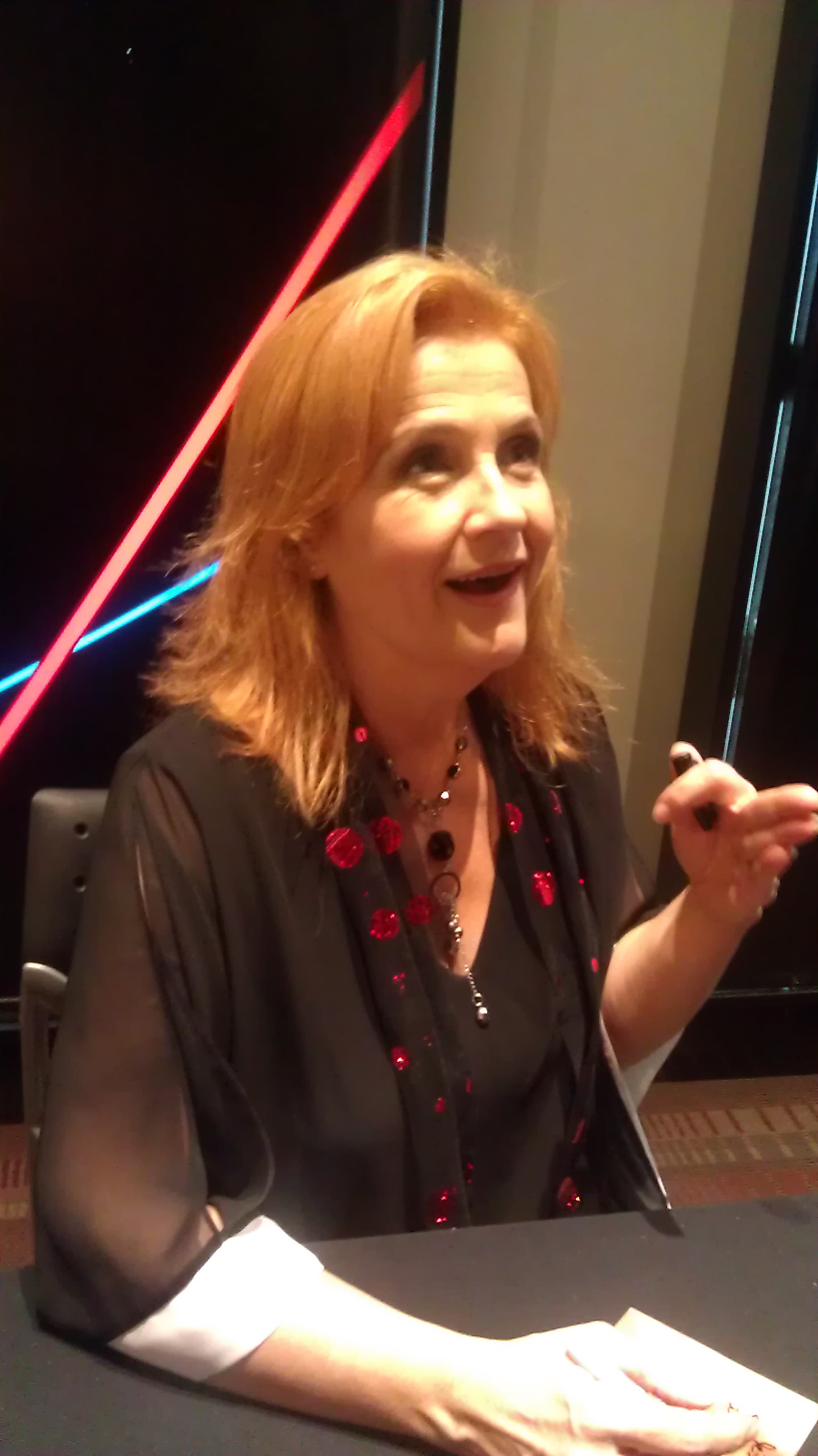

Background information
- Born: 3 April 1960 (age 65); Montreal, Quebec, Canada
- Genres: Pop, Adult contemporary
- Occupation: Singer
- Years active: 1982–present
- Label: GSI
- Website: mariedenisepelletier.com

Marie Denise Pelletier (born 3 April 1960) is a francophone Canadian singer. She served as President of Artisti, a copyright collective for music artists operated by Quebec's l'Union des artistes (UDA).

== Biography ==
While studying literature and cinema at the CÉGEP de Rosemont, Pelletier developed her song technique under veteran Quebec singer Lucille Dumont.

In 1982, she won honours at the Granby Festival of song and also first place in a CKMF-FM contest for song talent. In 1985, she recorded a 45 RPM vinyl single entitled "Échec et Mat" (Checkmate) before beginning studies at Berklee College of Music in Boston.

Upon returning to Quebec, she was offered the role of Stella Spotlight in the second Quebec production of the rock opera Starmania. In 1986 Pelletier composed and recorded her first album Premier Contact which received a nomination as "Discovery of the Year" at the Félix Awards.

In 1987, she recorded an album based on Starmania then proceeded to record her second album, À l'état pur (Pure State), that October, with the singles "Pour une histoire d'un soir" and "Tous les cris, les S.O.S.", composed by Balavoine. This was followed by 150 performances and some music videos, establishing Pelletier's career as a Quebec artist.

Her album Entre la tête et le cœur (Between the Head and the Heart) was awarded the best popular album of the year at the Gala de l'ADISQ in 1994.

Her 2011 album Marie Denise Pelletier reached 19 on the Top Canadian Albums chart.

In March 2019, she was one of 11 singers from Quebec, alongside Ginette Reno, Diane Dufresne, Céline Dion, Isabelle Boulay, Luce Dufault, Louise Forestier, Laurence Jalbert, Catherine Major, Ariane Moffatt and Marie-Élaine Thibert, who participated in a supergroup recording of Renée Claude's 1971 single "Tu trouveras la paix" after Claude's diagnosis with Alzheimer's disease was announced.

In 2020, Pelletier, Marie Carmen and Joe Bocan announced the joint concert tour Pour une histoire d'un soir, although the tour was delayed by the COVID-19 pandemic in Quebec and instead launched in 2022. The tour won the Félix Award for Variety or Reinterpretation Concert of the Year at the 44th Félix Awards.

== Discography ==
=== Albums ===
- 1986: Premier contact
- 1987: À l'état pur
- 1989: Survivre
- 1991: Le rendez-vous
- 1993: Entre la tête et le cœur (mixed by Andy Scott)
- 1996: Le sixième jour
- 1997: Ses plus grandes ballades (compilation)
- 2000: Plaisir d'amour
- 2003: Les mots de Marnay
- 2004: Ses plus belles chansons (compilation)
- 2005: Noël, parle-moi
- 2011: Marie Denise Pelletier

=== Singles ===
- 1985: "Échec et mat"
- 1986: "Parti via Vancouvert"
- 1986: "T'es pas Brando"
- 1987: "En courant"
- 1988: "Pour une histoire d'un soir"
- 1988: "Pourquoi (C'est si difficile d'aimer)"
- 1989: "Surprise"
- 1989: "Tous les cris, les S.O.S."
- 1990: "À dix-sept ans"
- 1990: "L'âme soeur"
- 1990: "L'amie de coeur"
- 1990: "Survivre ensemble"
- 1991: "J'ai douze ans"
- 1994: "Inventer la terre"
- 1994: "Manquer d'amour"
- 1994: "On ne sait pas c'que c'est"
- 1995: "Entre la tête et le coeur"
- 1995: "Entre moi et lui"
- 1995: "J'me meurs de toi"
- 1997: "Si c'était vrai"
- 1997: "Partie de loin"
- 1998: "Mon enfance m'attend"
- 1998: "Corsica"
- 2004: "Dis-moi ce qui ne va pas"
- 2005: "Noël parle-moi" (duo with Sylvie Tremblay)
