= Mary Ann Wells =

American dance teacher (1894–1971)

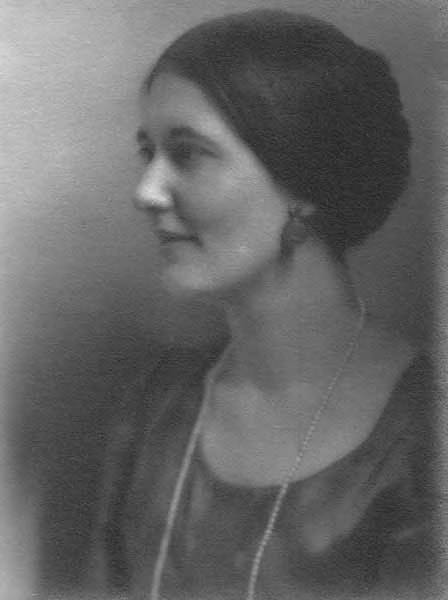
- Mary Ann Wells, member of the Soroptimist Club of Seattle, ca. 1920s.
- Born: June 7, 1894; Appleton, Wisconsin, U.S.
- Died: January 8, 1971 (aged 76)
- Occupation: Dance teacher
- Spouse: A. Forest King (m. 1916)

Mary Ann Wells (June 7, 1894 – January 8, 1971) was an American dance teacher known for her significant contributions to the field of dance education. Born in Appleton, Wisconsin, Wells began her career as the first ballet teacher at the Cornish School of Music in Seattle. She later established her own studio in c. 1922, where she emphasized a philosophy of artistic exploration and expression over technical precision. Throughout her career, Wells mentored numerous talented dancers, many of whom went on to achieve prominence in the dance world.

She is considered a noted ballet teacher in the Pacific Northwest.

== Biography ==
=== Early life and education ===
Mary Ann Wells was born on June 7, 1894, in Appleton, Wisconsin, to Charles Wells and Nell (last name unknown). Her dance training included studying with the noted ballet teacher Luigi Albertieri, who was associated with the Chicago Opera at the time. Wells's only performing experience was a brief stint with the Minnesota Stock Company.

=== Career ===
In 1916, at the age of 21, Wells relocated to Seattle and took on the role of the inaugural ballet instructor as well was the founder and head of the dancing department at the Cornish School of Music, a position she held until 1922. During her time at the Cornish School, Wells played a key role in establishing the ballet department and overseeing student performances, fostering an environment that nurtured aspiring dancers. It was also in 1916 that Wells married A. Forest King, a Seattle-based businessman, with whom she bore no children.

We wouldn't have this company today without her (Ms. Wells') vision. When we fell into her hands, we fell into her way of thinking.

– Gerald Arpino, in an interview with the Observer-Reporter in 1982

After her tenure at the Cornish School, Wells founded her own dance studio in Seattle in c. 1922. The studio named "Mary Ann Wells School of Dance," featured a quote from poet Kahlil Gibran on its walls, reflecting Wells' approach to dance instruction. Despite her association with the I AM Temple, which held to strict vegetarian practices, Wells focused on cultivating her students' passion for dance rather than enforcing rigid technical standards. Her teaching style encouraged exploration of many forms of dance.

Wells' studio, strategically located above a restaurant owned by the father of one of her most talented students, Robert Joffrey, served as an incubator for emerging dance talent. Under Wells' mentorship, several of her student dancers found success in the dance industry. Among them, Gerald Arpino, Martin Buckner, William Weslow, and Richard Englund gained prominence as choreographers and directors after honing their skills under her guidance. Arpino later co-founded the Joffrey Ballet.

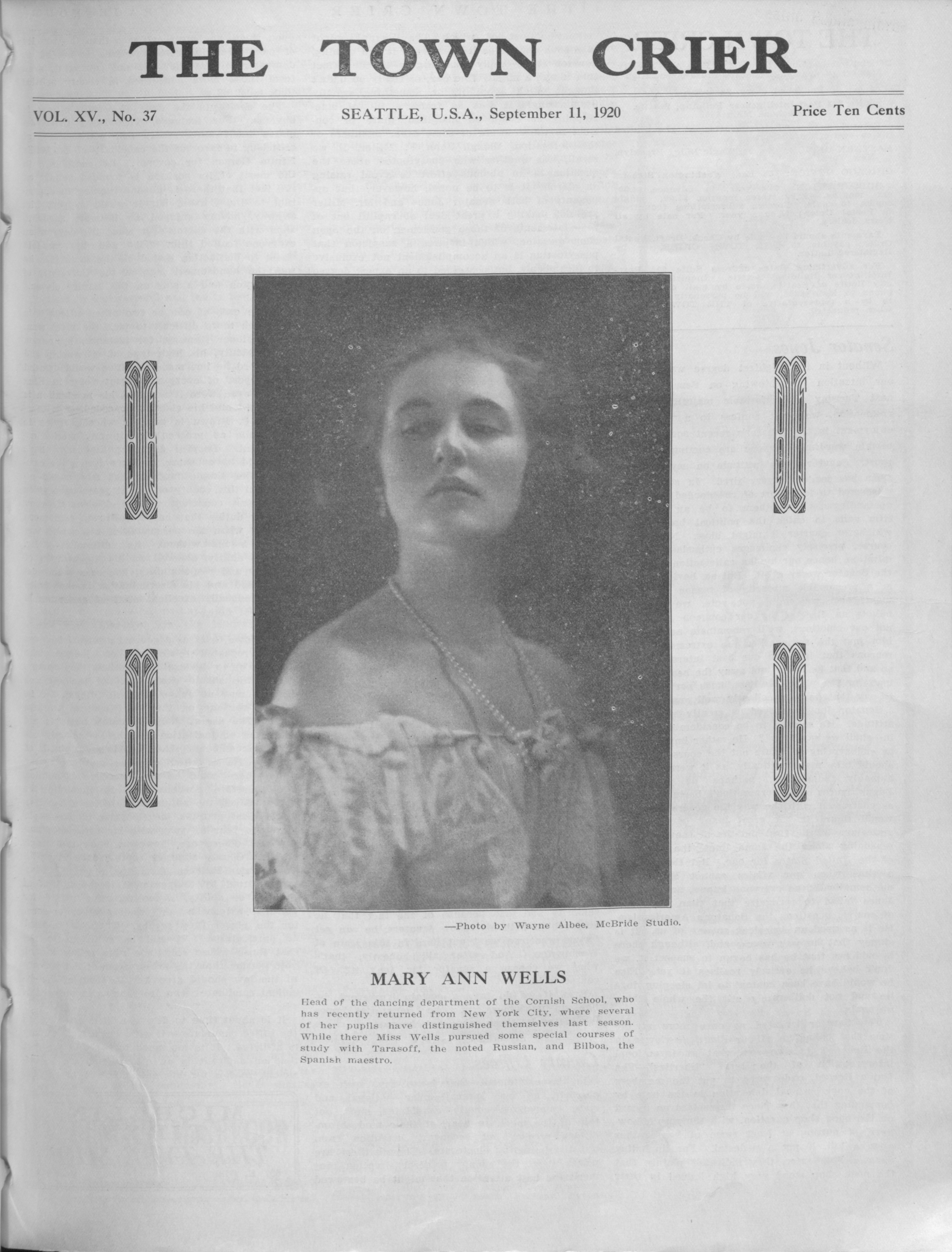
The Town Crier, v.15, no.37, Sep 11, 1920

=== Later life and legacy ===
She retired in 1958 due to poor eyesight. Despite minimal direct involvement with the Joffrey Ballet, its style echoed her teachings. The company dedicated its 1971–1972 season to her memory, following her death in 1971 in Seattle.

== See also ==
- List of dancers

== Bibliography ==
- Doris, Hering (February 2000). "Wells, Mary Ann". American National Biography. New York: Oxford University Press. doi:10.1093/anb/9780198606697.article.1802274. (subscription required)
- DoWW (2007). Commire, Anne; Klezmer, Deborah (eds.). Dictionary of Women Worldwide: 25,000 Women Through the Ages. Vol. 2. Yorkin Publications. p. 1980.
