= Denyse Benoit =

Canadian actress, director and screenwriter

Denyse Benoit is a Canadian actress, director and screenwriter from Montreal, Quebec. She is mostly known for La Crue (1977), La belle Apparence (1979) and Le dernier Havre (1986).

== Early life and education ==
Denyse Benoit was born on June 28, 1949, in Sainte-Dorothée, Quebec, Canada. She studied painting and sculpture from 1966 to 1968 at the School of Fine Arts in Montreal. After finishing her two years of university studies in Quebec, she moved to Belgium to continue to broaden her education. She studied at the Institute des arts de diffusion in Brussels. During those three years of studying she broadened her knowledge in multiple mediums associated to the arts. She took classes such as mass media, literature history, theater history, music, text manipulations, vocal expression, and text analysis.

== After her studies ==
In January 1971, once she obtained her diploma, she started an internship with actress and stage director Catherine Dasté in Paris at the Green Apples Theatre. During the month, she assisted Dasté in the direction of her play Glomoël et les pommes de terres géantes. In a paper she wrote, Catherine Dasté explains that Denyse Benoit was a hard working women and that she achieved her objectives with diligence and competence. After this internship she decided to continue working as a stage director for a while in Europe. In Belgium she took part in shows designed for children as an actress, host and stage director.

== Career ==
Back in Quebec she taught theatre and did cultural animation in Gaspésie and Montreal. At that time she already had written multiple scenarios such as La rué verte, Un instant près d’elle, Les sourires passagers, and Jeux de relations. In 1973 she wrote and directed her first short film Coup d'œil blanc (1973) and in 1974 she wrote her second one Un instant près d’elle (1974).

In 1976 she wrote and directed her third short film La Crue (1976), which takes place during the yearly spring flood in the Montreal suburbs of the same name. La Crue was created with the help of her friends and an extremely small budget. It was filmed during the weekends, which lasted a month, in which the flood took place that spring. The film won Best Scenario at the Festival de l'image de Montréal and was selected in many international festivals. In one French festival, her film was considered one of the best projections out of the ten that were presented.

In 1979 she directed, wrote and produced her first feature-length film La belle apparence (1979). Her film was selected in multiple festivals in Montreal and in France. At that time, French people did not know much about Quebec cinema and the film was an eye opening experience for them. In 1980 she wrote a script for an RTBF documentary named L’Étiquette (1980) that was directed by Manu Simon. In 1986 she wrote and directed her second feature-length film Le dernier havre, which is an adaptation of Yves Thériault’s book of the same name. The film is about the last days of an old fisherman's life and was filmed in the Baies des chaleurs. It won the Public Prize of the seven-day festival of Hull-Ottawa cinema. It also won a special mention at the festival of the sea in Toulou, France. She started working on the film in 1979 and it was only in 1982 that the script was finally ready to be brought to the big screen. The writer Yves Thériault, unfortunately died before the film was finished and never saw the result.

In 1986 she gave birth to her son and decided to concentrate her time on writing scripts. In 1991 she came back and wrote and directed a docudrama named Two Thieves (1991), which was about a Montreal sculptor and was presented on CBC Toronto. In 2003 to 2004 she wrote and directed a feature-length drama film named Le Secret de Cyndia, which was produced by Daniel Morin in Video format with an extremely low budget. During this time she also co-wrote another feature-length film named Station Nord, a Christmas story.

== After career ==
From 2005 to 2006 she stopped making movies and concentrated her work on writing literature for adults and for children. She wrote "Le lieu fit", "Olivia du Tarn", "Les contes de l'enfant aux tissous". She also started drawing illustrations for books and in 2009 she built her own studio where she concentrates her time on doing artistic work. Like she said in an interview, plastic arts are her favourite past-time.

== Important position ==
From 1976 to 1990 she was the vice-president and treasurer of the Quebec directors association.

== Filmography ==
Short film

Year	Title	Director	Writer	Prize
1973	Coup d'oeil blanc	Yes	Yes	
1974	Un Instant près d'elle	Yes	Yes	
1976	La Crue	Yes	Yes	Prize of the best scenario at the Montreal festival of Images Selected in multiple international festivals

Feature film

Year	Title	Director	Writer	Prize
1979	A Beautiful Facade (La belle apparence)	Yes	Yes	
1980	L'étiquette	No	Yes	
1986	Le dernier havre	Yes	Yes	Public Prize at the seven-day festival of Hull-Ottawa cinema
1991	Two Thieves	Yes	Yes	
2002	Le Secret de Cyndia	Yes	Yes	
2002	North Station (Station Nord)	No	Yes	
