= Greta Kraus =

Canadian classical pianist

Greta Kraus (3 August 1907 – 30 May 1998) was a Canadian pianist, harpsichordist and music teacher of Austrian origin.

== Life ==
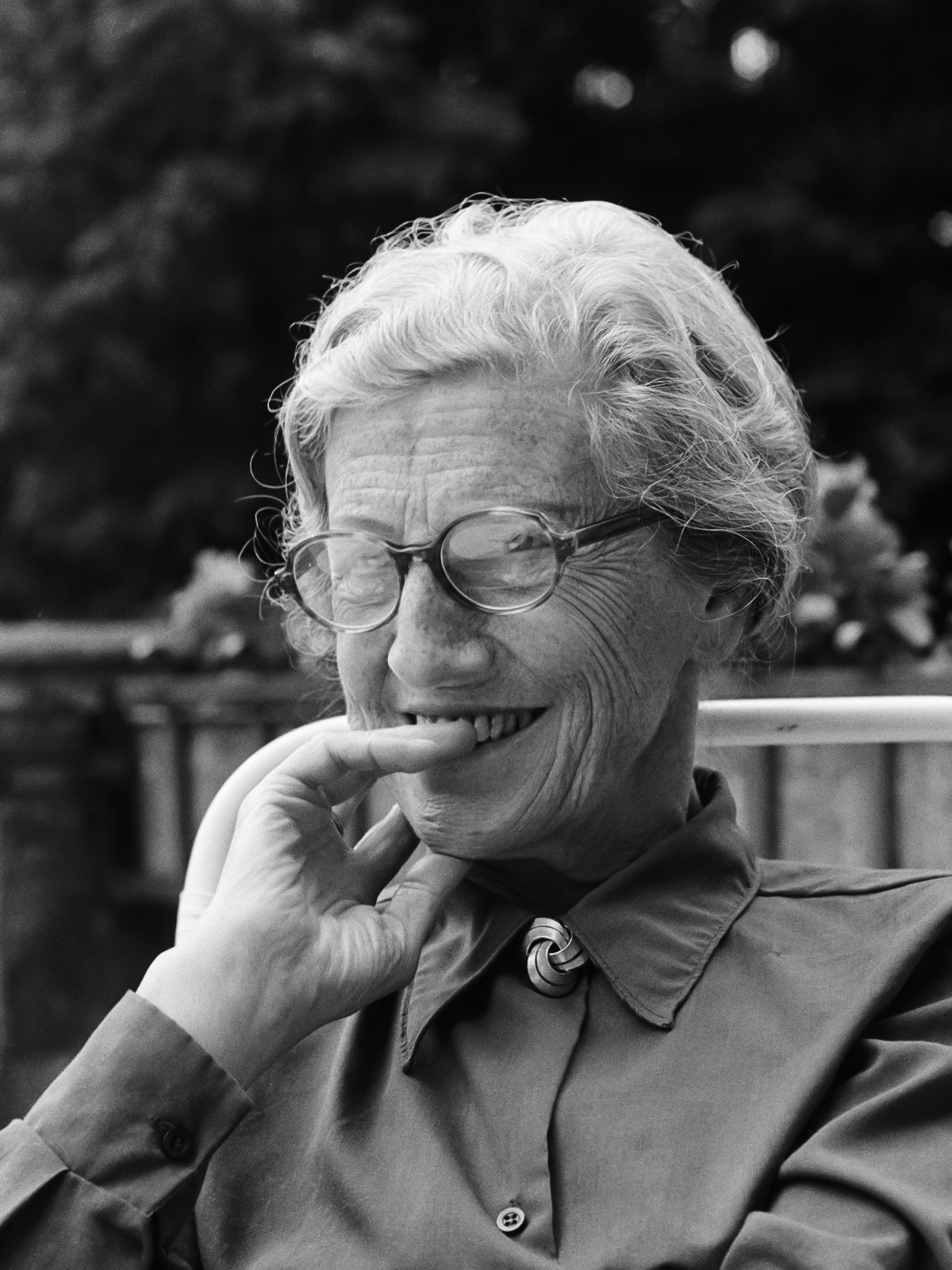
Greta Kraus during a visit to Vienna in June 1974

Born in Vienna, Kraus attended the University of Music and Performing Arts Vienna from 1923, where she received a diploma as a music teacher in 1930. She studied piano and music history with Hans Weisse (1924-31) and music analysis with Heinrich Schenker (1931-34), to whose book Five Graphic Musical Analyses she contributed a part on Fryderyk Chopin's Etude in F Major.

In 1935, she made her debut as harpsichord soloist with the Vienna Bach Society. The following year, she participated in a performance of Bach's Musical Offering in a version for eight instruments conducted by Hermann Scherchen. In 1937, she performed in London with the Boyd Neel Orchestra and with the BBC. In 1938, she moved to Canada and in 1939 began teaching at the Havergal College in Toronto.

She soon became known as a harpsichord soloist and chamber musician (including duo partner with Arnold Walter), and from 1942 to 1956 was continuo player in performances of Bach's Passions and Mass in B Minor and Messiah by Handel at the Massey Hall, conducted by Ernest MacMillan. In 1964, she accompanied David and Igor Oistrakh on their visit to Canada. Her repertoire also included harpsichord works by 20th century composers such as Francis Poulenc and Frank Martin.

Starring Elizabeth Benson Guy (soprano), Nicholas Fiore (flute), Donald Whitton (cello) and Corol McCartney (violin), she founded the Toronto Baroque Ensemble in 1958. In 1965, she formed the Aitken-Kraus Duo with flutist Robert Aitken, which was active until 1986. On the piano, she accompanied Lois Marshall in 1979 in a performance of Franz Schubert's Die schöne Müllerin and in 1981 in a concert of Hugo Wolff songs at Toronto's Hartt House.

Kraus gave private piano lessons from 1939. She also taught song and chamber music, harpsichord, piano accompaniment and baroque performance practice at the Royal Conservatory of Music in Toronto from 1943 to 1969 and at the University of Toronto from 1963. From 1963 to 1976, she succeeded Ernesto Barbini director of the Collegium Musicum; she also gave master classes at the Banff Centre for the Arts, at the Shawnigan Summer School of the Arts and at various universities. Her students have included Douglas Bodle, Austin Clarkson, Elizabeth Keenan, R. Murray Schafer, Patrick Wedd and Valerie Weeks as well as singers Russell Braun, Elizabeth Benson Guy, Ingemar Korjus, Andrew MacMillan, Mary Morrison, Gary Relyea, Roxolana Roslak and Teresa Stratas.

The Ontario Confederation of University Faculty Associations honoured her in 1973 for her exceptional contribution to university teaching. In 1975, she was named Outstanding Woman of the Province of Ontario. She received the Toronto Arts Award in 1990, the Order of Toronto in 1991 and became a member of the Order of Canada in 1992. In Vienna, the Greta-Kraus-Weg was named after her in 2004.

Kraus died in Toronto at the age of 90.
