= North Station (film) =

2002 Canadian film

- French: Station Nord
- Directed by: Jean-Claude Lord
- Written by: Denyse Benoit; Daniel Morin
- Produced by: Pierre Gendron; Daniel Morin
- Starring: Benoît Brière; Renée Claude; Xavier Morin-Lefort; Lansana Kourouma; Catherine Florent
- Cinematography: Serge Desrosiers
- Edited by: Claude Palardy
- Music by: Daniel Constantineau; Daniel Bélanger
- Production companies: Bloom Films; Z Productions
- Distributed by: Les Films Equinoxe
- Release date: November 11, 2002
- Running time: 102 minutes
- Country: Canada
- Language: French

North Station (French: Station Nord) is a Canadian children's comedy film, directed by Jean-Claude Lord and released in 2002.

The film is set in the town of North Station, where children's letters to Santa Claus (Benoît Brière) were delivered for many years and answered by a local family; after the death of his grandfather, Samuel (Xavier Morin-Lefort) and his girlfriend Évelyne (Roxanne Gaudette-Loiseau) decide to carry on the tradition, but Samuel goes missing and is presumed dead after trying to deliver the letters in a snowstorm, when in fact he has been saved and taken to Santa's workshop at the North Pole. When a letter arrives fifty years later from Satia, the granddaughter of Évelyne (Renée Claude), requesting Santa's help in curing Évelyne of cancer, Samuel becomes motivated to go out to reunite with his lost love.

The cast also includes Lansana Kourouma, Catherine Florent, Genevieve Déry, Nathalie Simard, Gaston Lepage and Louis-Georges Girard.

The film was released in theatres on November 11, 2002.

The film received a Jutra Award nomination for Best Art Direction at the 5th Jutra Awards in 2003.

== Plot ==
In 1950, Samuel, a 14-year-old mail carrier, is saved from death by a young elf who takes him to Santa’s workshop, where he becomes in charge of the mail in the magical world. A few decades later, at the special request of a seven-year-old girl and at the risk of his own life, he returns to the human world with his friends to save his former sweetheart from illness by bringing her back with him to the magical realm of the most beloved mythological figure on Earth: Santa Claus.
