= Lucille Dumont =

Canadian singer and radio and television host

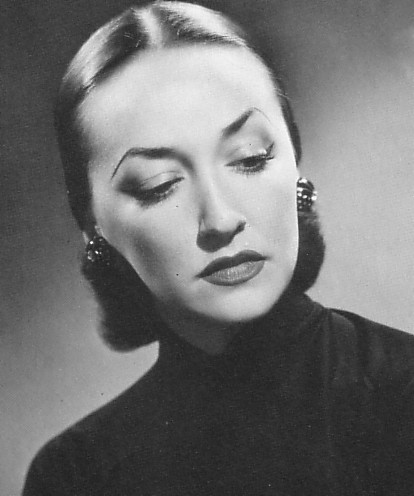
- Dumont, pictured in 1940.
- Born: Lucelle Dumont; January 20, 1919; Montreal, Quebec, Canada
- Died: July 29, 2016 (aged 97)
- Other name: Micheline Lalonde
- Occupations: Singer, radio/television host
- Years active: 1935–1999
- Spouse: Jean Maurice Bailly

Lucille Dumont (born Lucelle Dumont; January 20, 1919 – July 29, 2016) was a Canadian singer and radio and television host. She is credited by the Canadian Songwriters Hall of Fame with having "served and personified Quebec popular music" and popularized the music of Quebec songwriters by singing their songs. She is also credited with being "at the birth of Quebec television," participating in Radio Canada's first television shows.

She was inducted into the Canadian Songwriters Hall of Fame in 2006 and was an Officer of the Order of Canada and an Officer of the National Order of Quebec.

== Early life ==
Lucelle Dumont was born on January 20, 1919, in Montreal, Quebec. At a young age, she was encouraged by her mother – who possessed a somewhat unorthodox attitude for the time – to perform on a radio station.

== Career ==
Dumont first performed under the name of Micheline Lalonde due to the then-prevailing societal stigma around being a performer.

On October 16, 1935, at age 16, Dumont made her professional debut, performing on the Sweet Caporal radio show, produced by Léo Le Sieur, a pianist, organist, and composer who served as her mentor. She began hosting the Linger Awhile and Two Messengers of Melody radio show the same year, with Le Sieur performing the organ on the latter show at James S. Ogilvy's Tudor Hall. Radio Canada hired Dumont to participate in or host shows including Variétés françaises, Rêverie, Sur les boulevards, Le moulin qui jazze, Le p’tit bal des copains, Connaissez-vous la musique, Tambour battant and Hier, aujourd'hui.

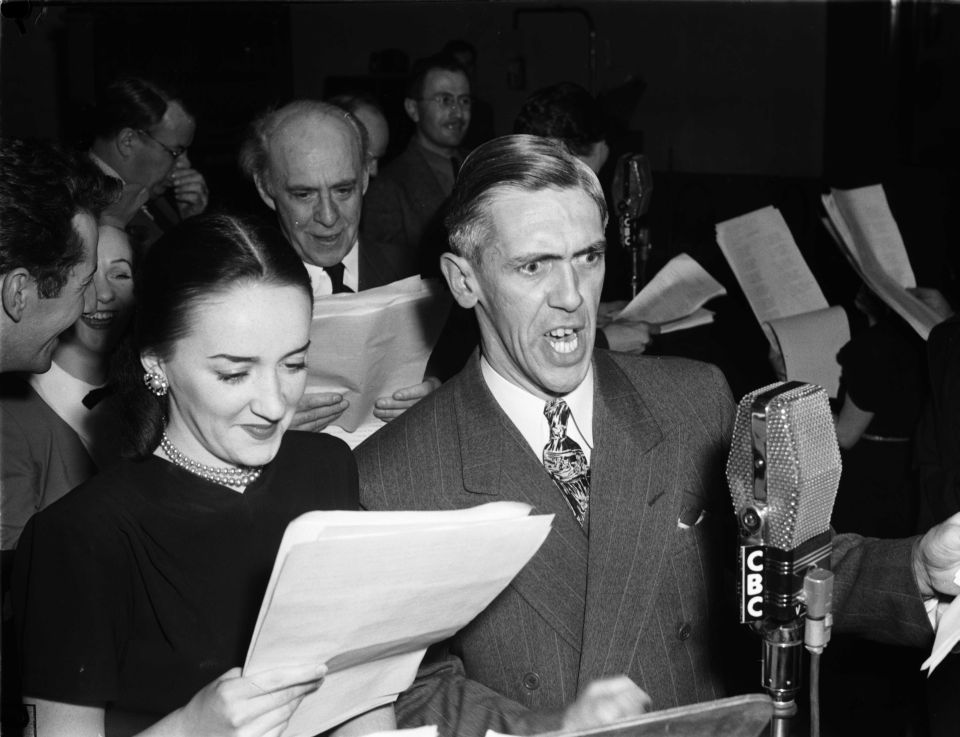
Dumont pictured with singer Rolland Bédard at Radio-Canada's "Soirée du samedi soir" ("Saturday night party") in Montreal, November 30, 1946.

In the early stages of her career, Dumont primarily performed Lucienne Boyer's songs, focusing on French music from the start. In April 1945, at a War Loan Drive concert, she performed Insensiblement, composed by Paul Misraki and conducted by Ray Ventura. This was the Quebec premiere of the song and was known as an "astounding success." Ventura invited Dumont to travel to France and go on a performing tour; however, she turned down the offer as she would marry Jean Maurice Bailly, a sports commentator at Radio Canada, in two months.

The Canadian Encyclopedia describes Dumont as songwriter Jacques Blanchet's "greatest interpreter." Performing his songs, Dumont placed first at the Concours de la chanson canadienne in 1957 and second in 1962 at the Chansons sur mesure competition.

In 1965, she hosted Lucille Dumont, a television show. That same year, she recorded her second album; it featured Canadian songwriters and was released by Columbia Records.

In 1968, Dumont began giving lessons in performance. She established Atelier de la Chanson, a music school in Montreal, and dedicated a large amount of time to teaching, explaining in an interview that she found it enriching. Marie-Denise Pelletier, Suzanne Stevens, and Julie Arel were among the students she instructed. The National Order of Quebec credited her with having contributed to launching several Quebec artists' careers.

Dumont retired in 1999 and died on July 29, 2016 at the age of 97.

=== Partial discography ===
Title	Composer(s)
Avant	Clémence DesRochers Pierre Calvé
Chanson inutile	Gilles Vigneault Pierre Calvé
Ciel se marie avec la mer (Le)	Jacques Blancet
En do majeur	Michel Conte
Je resterai tout seul	Michel Conte Neil Chotem
Machines (Les)	Michel Conte
Main noire (La)	Unknown
Maître Pierre	Henri Betti Jacques Plante
Mon Saint-Laurent si grand si grand	R. Tournier

=== Awards and honours ===
In 1947, Dumont was elected as Miss Radio by Radiomonde's readership. She was the first singer to win the title. In 1950, Jean Baulu named Dumont the "Grande Dame de la Chanson." Dumont was inducted into the Canadian Songwriters Hall of Fame in 2006.

In 2009, she was made an Officer of the Order of Canada. Two years later, she became an Officer of the National Order of Quebec.
