= Mena Kasmiri Abdullah =

Australian writer and poet

Mena Kasmiri Abdullah (born 1930) is an Australian writer and poet who has been widely published in The Bulletin, Quadrant, Coast to Coast and in numerous Australian anthologies. She is best known for her stories about Indian immigrant families and the difficulties of adjusting to a new culture.

== Life ==
Mena Abdullah was born in Bundarra, New South Wales, in 1930, the daughter of immigrant Indian parents. She grew up on her family's sheep farm in northern New South Wales. She attended Sydney Girls High School. Later she became an accountant and worked for the CSIRO for 40 years. Her portrait by Fred Martin was a finalist in the Archibald Prize in 1953.

== Writing career ==
Abdullah started writing poetry, influenced by her love for Australian bush ballads. She had many of these poems published in The Bulletin in the 1950s. She wanted Australians to better understand the immigrant Indian experience. She was one of the first writers to describe the Australian experience from this perspective.

She met Ray Mathew at CSIRO and he suggested she submit her stories to The Bulletin. She wrote several short stories with Mathew which were published as The Time of the Peacock in 1965. The collection "depicts the life of an Indian family in rural Australia, evoked in lyrical terms, sensitive to the slightest sway of emotion and thought, conjuring up simultaneously, the pain of exile and the sheer joy of living."

== Bibliography ==
=== Collection of short stories ===
- The Time of the Peacock (1965) with Ray Mathew

=== Poetry ===
- The Red Koran (1955)
- The Red Wattle (1959)
- Chuppaty Chap (1955)
- The Prison (1956)
