= Renée Claude =

Canadian actress (1939–2020)

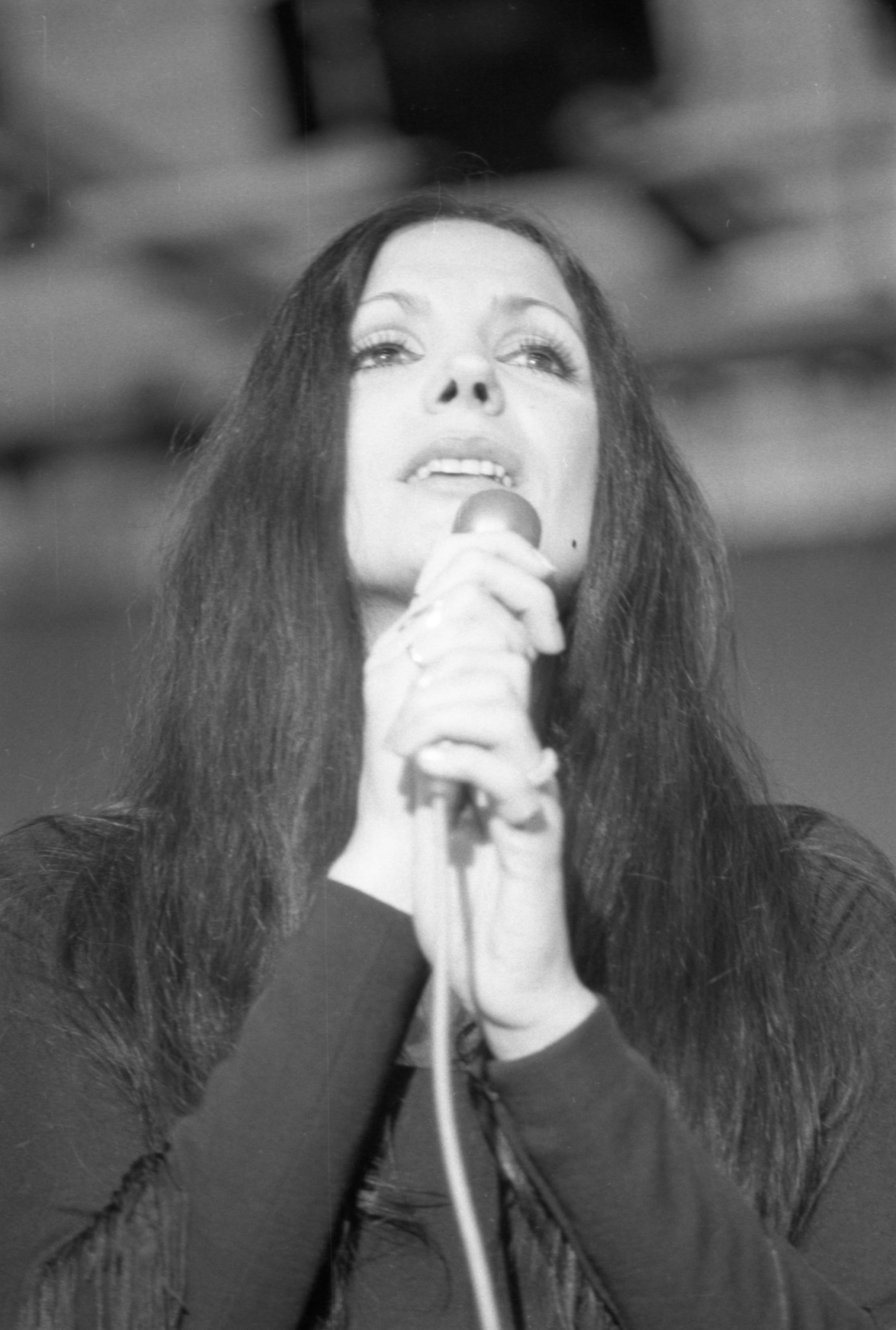

Background information
- Born: Renée Bélanger; July 3, 1939; Montreal, Quebec, Canada
- Died: May 12, 2020 (aged 80) Montreal, Quebec, Canada
- Genres: Chanson, pop
- Occupations: Singer, actress
- Instrument: Vocals
- Years active: 1959–2015
- Labels: Sélect, Columbia, Barclay, London, Solset, Transit

Renée Claude CM (born Renée Bélanger; July 3, 1939 – May 12, 2020) was a Canadian actress and singer who was known as an interpretive singer, particularly of songs by Stéphane Venne, Michel Conte, Georges Brassens and Léo Ferré.

== Early life ==
She was born Renée Bélanger in Montreal. She studied piano at the École de musique Vincent-d'Indy, took singing lessons from Alphonse Ledoux, and won a music competition on CKVL radio program Découvertes de Billy Munro in 1955.

== Musical career ==
In 1960 she made her first major television appearance on Clémence DesRochers's Télévision de Radio-Canada variety show Chez Clémence. Around the same era she began performing in Quebec City's boîtes à chanson, specializing in the songs of Ferré, Brassens and Jean-Pierre Ferland. She released her self-titled first album on Distribution Select in 1963, and followed up with three more albums on the label by 1966.

In 1967 she made an appearance on The Tonight Show with Johnny Carson, and performed at Expo 67 in Montreal. In the same year she moved to Columbia Records and released her breakthrough album Shippagan; the album's title track was her first major hit single in Quebec, and she won the award for best singer at the Gala des artistes in 1968. However, Shippagan was her sole album for Columbia, as she moved to Barclay for her 1969 album C'est notre fête aujourd'hui. She released five further albums on Barclay between 1969 and 1973, and scored popular hits in this era with the songs "C'est notre fête aujourd'hui", "Le Tour de la terre", "La Rue de la Montagne", "Tu trouveras la paix", "Le Début d'un temps nouveau", "C'est toi, c'est moi, c'est lui, c'est nous autres", "Quand le temps tournera au beau", "T'oublier, t'oublier" and "Sais-tu que je t'aime depuis longtemps".

She then moved to London Records, for whom she released two albums in 1975 and 1976, and then to Solset Records, releasing an album in 1979.

In the 1980s, with pop tastes changing, Claude began creating shows and albums that paid tribute to specific artists who had inspired her, including DesRochers, Brassens and Ferré. She won the Grand Prix du Disque for French Song from the Académie Charles Cros in 1996 for her Ferré album On a marché sur l'amour.

In the 1990s she began taking acting roles, appearing in stage productions of Nelligan, Tu faisais comme un appel and Marcel poursuivi par les chiens, in the television series Avec un grand A, Lance et compte and Triplex, and in the films It's Your Turn, Laura Cadieux (C't'à ton tour, Laura Cadieux) and North Station (Station Nord).

She was appointed a member of the Order of Canada in 2009.

== Alzheimer's diagnosis and tributes ==
In February 2019, it was announced that Claude had been diagnosed with Alzheimer's disease. Following the announcement, singers Ginette Reno, Diane Dufresne, Céline Dion, Isabelle Boulay, Luce Dufault, Louise Forestier, Laurence Jalbert, Catherine Major, Ariane Moffatt, Marie Denise Pelletier and Marie-Élaine Thibert participated in a supergroup recording of "Tu trouveras la paix" as a charitable fundraiser for Alzheimer's research. Some of the same artists, as well as Clémence DesRochers and Kathleen Fortin, performed at a fundraising benefit concert on November 15, 2019 at Montreal Symphony House.

== Death ==
Claude died from COVID-19 on May 12, 2020, during the COVID-19 pandemic in Canada.

== Discography ==
- 1963: Renée Claude Volume 1
- 1964: Renée Claude Volume 2
- 1965: Renée Claude Volume 3 – Il y eut un jour
- 1966: Renée Claude Volume 4
- 1967: Shippagan
- 1969: C'est notre fête aujourd'hui
- 1969: Le tour de la terre
- 1970: Le début d'un temps nouveau
- 1971: Tu trouveras la paix
- 1972: Je reprends mon souffle
- 1973: Ce soir je fais l'amour avec toi
- 1975: Je suis une femme
- 1976: L'enamour, le désamour
- 1979: Bonjour
- 1981: Moi c'est Clémence que j'aime le mieux
- 1983: Renée Claude chante Georges Brassens
- 1986: Renée Claude
- 1990: Nelligan
- 1993: J'ai rendez-vous avec vous: Renée Claude chante Georges Brassens
- 1994: On a marché sur l'amour: Renée Claude chante Léo Ferré
