= The Medea of Euripides (radio play) =

1954 Australian radio play by Ray Mathew

- Running time: 80 mins (9:15 pm – 10:45 pm)
- Country of origin: Australia
- Language: English
- Home station: 2BL
- Starring: Sybil Thorndike
- Written by: Ray Mathew
- Directed by: John Casson

The Medea of Euripides is a 1954 Austraslian radio play by Ray Mathew. It was his adaptation of Medea by Euripides.

The play was written for Sydney John Kay's Mercury Theatre radio division. Mathews said he "kept, in my very free version, strictly to the form of Euripides’ play, and I tried by adding and subtracting to bring out for a contemporary audience exactly what I thought was the play's content... , I tried to make the play mean for us what I imagined it meant for the original Greek audience." There was controversy over how much the work was an original by Mathews.

The play was performed on ABC radio in December 1954 with Sybil Thorndike and Lewis Casson in the cast. Their son directed. This was prestigious for an Australian play at the time.

== Premise ==
"Medea, the barbaric princess, who for love of Jason betrayed her father and her own people, and left her native land to sail back with Jason to Greece, using her witchcraft to save him from Innumerable dangers, and then at last found herself betrayed."

== Cast ==
- Stewart Ginn as Narrator/Attendant
- Sybil Thorndike as Medea
- Agnes Dobson as Nurse
- John Morgan as Creon, King of Corinth
- Williams Lloyd as Aegeus, King of Athens
- Robert Peach as Messenger
- Lewis Casson as Jason
- Marica Hunt as Woman of the House
- Peter Oliver as Elder child
- Jane Casson as Younger child
- Patricia Kennedv as Chorus 1
- Moira Carletoh as Chorus 2
- Peggv Nunn as Chorus 3
- Bettine Kauffmann as Chorus 4

== Reception ==
The Brisbane Truth said "Those great idols of the theatre, Dame Sybil Thprndike and Sir Lewis Casson, with no stage movement to charm the eye of the beholder, sounded in this more restricted medium, frankly old, and there was almost a touch of the ridiculous about the whole production."

The Age called it "poor material... only saved from complete failure by the calibre of the artists who plav'ed In it."

The Daily Telegraph sadid "The entire production was interpreted, over a period of 90 minutes, in a sostenuto of the most depressing howlings-and hootings, punctuated... with a number of piercing screams,, calculated to crack he eardrum like a window pane."
