= A Spring Song =

1958 Drama play by Australian author Ray Mathew

- Original language: English
- Written by: Ray Mathew
- Characters: Dad Dennison; Margaret Dennison; Kerry Dennison; Helen Dennison; Peter; Geoff
- Genre: Drama
- Setting: an outback property

Premiere
- Date: March 1958
- Place: Brisbane, Queensland, Australia

A Spring Song is a 1958 drama play by Australian author Ray Mathew.

The play was published in 1961 and 1985 and was adapted for Canadian television in 1965.

== Synopsis ==
The play tells the story of a farming family consisting of a father, Dad Dennison, and his three daughters, Margaret, Kerry and Helen. Margaret is dying of brain cancer and falls in love with their boarder, Peter, a poet. Helen moves to Sydney. Kerry is in love with Geoff, a grazier's son, but is trapped into staying at home.

== Performances ==
=== Australian productions ===
Mathew's play The Life of the Party had recently been a finalist in a play competition. A Spring Song was given a reading by the Elizabethan Theatre Trust in 1957. The Age called the script "immature, pretentious and unskilled" but "moving in a way not often encountered in our country."

It played at Gowrie Hall in Brisbane, followed by the Sydney Pocket Theatre in 1958 and the Sydney Morning Herald said it was "not a success... but there is enough thoughtfulness and originality to suggest that his [Mathews'] future will contain plays of solid importance". It was the financially the most successfulplay at the Pocket theatre for 1958.

It was performed at Willard Hall in Adelaide in 1963.

Since then, the play has been presented in various Australian locations, including The Playhouse, Broken Hill (1967), Taylor Street, Brisbane (1980), Stables Theatre, Sydney (1983), Studio Theatre, Melbourne (1985), Cremorne Theatre, Brisbane (1988) Newtown Theatre, Sydney (1993) and Acton Street Theatre, Canberra (1994). A 1977 NIDA production starred Annie Byron, Wayne Jarratt and Debra Lawrance and was directed by Robert Menzies.

Leslie Rees called it an "underdeveloped drama" with "hints of poetic insight, of pathos and the pain of living.

=== British productions ===
The play was successfully presented at the Edinburgh Festival in 1964 and transferred to the West End that year.

The Evening Standard called it a "mellow, sentimental melodrama".

== Television adaptation ==
"A Spring Song"
- Festival episode
- Based on: play by Ray Mathew
- Original air date: May 12, 1965

Guest appearances
- Zoe Caldwell as Margaret; Sharon Acker as Helen; Martha Henry as Kerry; John Drainie as Mr. Dennison; Amelia Hall as Mrs. Dennison; Paul Massie as Peter; Michael Sarrazin as Jeff

The play was broadcast in Canada on the CBC Television anthology series Festival on 12 May 1965 with the story relocated to the Canadian prairies. A Spring Song in Six Scenes starred Zoe Caldwell as Margaret and special guest star Paul Massie as Peter with Martha Henry (Kerry), Sharon Acker (Helen), Michael Sarrazin (Jeff), and playing Mr. and Mrs. Dennison, John Drainie and Amelia Hall.
