= CBC Montreal Orchestra =

Canadian radio orchestra

- Orchestra
- Founded: 1947; 78 years ago
- Disbanded: 1968; 57 years ago
- Location: Montreal, Canada
- Principal conductor: Alexander Brott; Roland Leduc

The CBC Montreal Orchestra was a radio orchestra based in Montreal, Canada, that was active from 1947 through 1968. It was operated by the Canadian Broadcasting Corporation.

== History ==
The CBC Montreal Orchestra was established in 1947. Its inaugural broadcast on November 26, 1947, featured the world premiere of Alexander Brott's symphonic suite From Sea to Sea with Brott leading the musical forces which consisted of 65 players. Following this, the ensemble was reduced and operated as a chamber orchestra under conductor Roland Leduc for the CBC Radio concert series The Little Symphonies (French: Les Petites Symphonies); a radio program which was established in 1948 and continued to run for over a decade. The orchestra occasionally operated as a larger ensemble during these years, bringing in extra players for special concerts and recordings.

When The Little Symphonies ceased in the early 1960s, the CBC Montreal Orchestra expanded to a full size symphony orchestra for broadcasts and recordings during the remaining part of the decade; usually under the direction of Leduc. The Canadian Broadcasting Corporation disbanded the ensemble in the Spring of 1968. ·
