= William Weslow =

American dancer (born 1925)

- Born: 1925; Seattle, Washington, USA
- Died: January 29, 2013 (aged 87); New York City, New York
- Occupation: Dancer

William Weslow was an American dancer who split his career between ballet and musical theatre.

== Dance career ==
Weslow studied ballet with the noted teacher Mary Ann Wells, whose other students included Marc Platt and Tommy Rall. He spent most of his career with the New York City Ballet, where he was promoted to soloist by 1960. In addition to featured roles in George Balanchine's Night Shadows (or La Somnambula), Theme and Variations, The Prodigal Son, Western Symphony, and The Four Temperaments, Weslow also danced in ballets by Frederick Ashton, Todd Bolender, Willam Christensen, and Lew Christensen. At American Ballet Theatre, he was featured in Katherine Litz's The Enchanted. Some of his performances were filmed and have been archived at the New York Public Library.

On Broadway, Weslow was featured in Annie Get Your Gun and appeared in the original casts of four other musicals, including Call Me Madam, Wonderful Town, and Plain and Fancy. He also performed at Radio City Music Hall.

Weslow's television credits include being a regular on Your Hit Parade, as well as guest appearances on Omnibus and various specials.

== Later life ==
By the late 1960s, Weslow had already gained a reputation as a skilled masseur, working with dancers like his friend Edward Villella. After retiring from dance, Weslow became a successful massage therapist.

== Personal life ==
Weslow was involved at various times with photographer George Platt Lynes and choreographer Jerome Robbins.
