= Michel Conte =

Canadian choreographer, lyricist and composer (1932–2008)

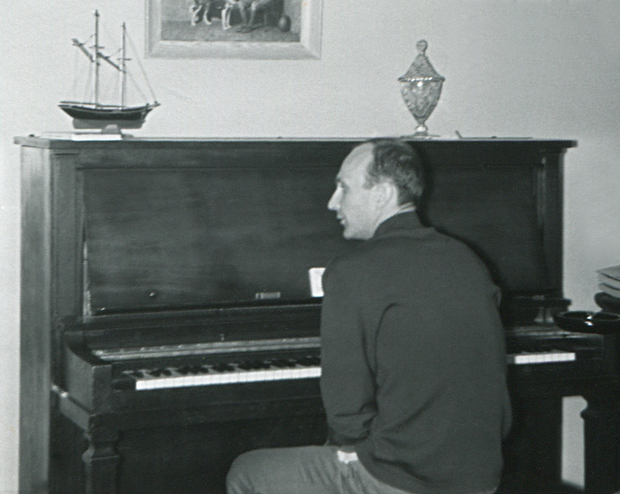
Michel Conte at the piano at a private concert in 1964.

Michel Conte (born Michel Seunes; 17 July 1932 in Villeneuve-sur-Lot – 5 January 2008) was a French-born, naturalized Canadian choreographer, lyricist and composer of film music and television music.

His compositions were first sung by Lucille Dumont, then by Renée Claude, Monique Leyrac, Suzanne Stevens and Julie Arel.
