= Ray Mathew =

Australian writer (1929–2002)

Raymond Frank "Ray" Mathew (14 April 1929 – 27 May 2002) was an Australian author. Mathew wrote poetry, drama, radio plays and filmscripts, short stories, novels, arts and literature criticism, and other non-fiction. He left Australia in 1960 and never returned, dying in New York City, where he had lived since 1968.

== Early life and education ==
Raymond Frank "Ray" Mathew was born on 14 April 1929 in Sydney.

He lived in Leichhardt and Bondi during his childhood, attending Sydney Boys High School.

He attended Sydney Teachers' College from 1947 to 1949.

== Teaching and work in Australia ==
Between 1949 and 1951 Mathew taught at small country schools in New South Wales, where he was often the only teacher. His experience as a lone and lonely teacher is expressed in his best-known play, A Spring Song, which was first performed in 1958.

He wrote two plays for radio, Gautama Buddha, aka The Love of Gotama, for which Cecil Fraser wrote the music, and The Medea of Euripides starring Dame Sybil Thorndike and Sir Lewis Casson as Medea and Jason, both broadcast over the Australian Broadcasting Commission radio network, in 1952 and 1954 respectively.

During the 1950s Mathew also worked in shops, moved furniture, gave school broadcasts and adult education lectures, wrote literary reviews for the Sydney Morning Herald as a freelance journalist, worked for the CSIRO as an accounts officer 1952–1954 and was a tutor and lecturer at the University of Sydney 1955–1960.

== Leaving Australia ==
Mathew left Australia for Italy in 1960. After some time there he moved to London, where he lived until 1968 when he went to New York and met the inventor, Paul Kollsman and his wife Eva. His British lover, Tony Hippisley, had committed suicide the year before. The Kollsmans, and especially Eva, assisted Mathew through their literary connections.

Mathew remained in New York for the rest of his life. In 1969, he wrote in a letter to his Australian artist friend, Pixie O'Harris, "I have probably not been happier in my life. There are people here I like immensely.... I'm 40 – I feel very grown up." He worked as a freelance writer and art critic while working on his novels and poetry. While he continued to write for the rest of his life publishing success evaded him. His last published book, The Joys of Possession, appeared in 1967.

Eva Kollsman became a lifelong patron and supporter of Mathews, and theirs was an intensely intimate relationship.

== Death and legacy ==
Mathew died on 27 May 2002 in New York.

Eva Kollsman donated his papers to the National Library of Australia (NLA) following his death and established a trust to support research into Australian writers.

In 2009, the NLA established the annual Ray Mathew Lecture, with Geraldine Brooks giving the inaugural lecture. In 2025, the lecture was given by Christos Tsiolkas.

== List of works ==
=== Plays ===
- Church Sunday (1950)
- Puppet Love (1950)
- Sing for St. Ned (1951)
- The Love of Gautama (radio play, 1952)
- The Boomerang and the Bantam (1953)
- The Medea of Euripides (radio play, 1954)
- We Find the Bunyip (first produced, 1955; published in Khaki, Bush and Bigotry, 1968)
- The Bones of My Toe (first produced, 1957; unpublished)
- Lonely Without You (1957)
- The Life of the Party (first produced 1958; finalist in the 1957 London Observer International Play Competition; published in Plays of the '50s, 2004)
- A Spring Song (first produced, 1958; published, 1961 and 1985)

=== Short-story collections ===
- A Bohemian Affair: Short Stories (1961)
- The Time of the Peacock: Stories with Mena Abdullah (1965)

=== Novel ===
- The Joys of Possession (1967)

=== Poetry collections ===
- With Cypress Pine (1951) (Highly Commended in Grace Leven Prize)
- Song and Dance (1956)
- South of the Equator (1961)
- Moonsong and Other Poems (1962)

=== Prose ===
- Charles Blackman's Paintings (1965)
- Tense Little Lives: Uncollected Prose of Ray Mathew (2007)

== Papers ==
The National Library of Australia holds Ray Mathew's papers. They were donated by Eve Kollsman.
