= Lois Marshall =

Canadian opera singer

- Born: January 29, 1925; Toronto, Ontario, Canada
- Died: February 19, 1997 (aged 72); Toronto, Ontario, Canada
- Education: Royal Conservatory of Music; University of Toronto
- Occupation: singer
- Spouse: Weldon Kilburn

Lois Catherine Marshall, CC (January 29, 1925 – February 19, 1997) was a Canadian soprano. Her husband, Weldon Kilburn, had been her early coach and piano accompanist.

== Early life and studies; awards ==
Born in Toronto, Ontario, Marshall "began voice studies at age 12 with Weldon Kilburn (at the Royal Conservatory of Music in Toronto), her accompanist and coach until 1971 and to whom she was eventually married in 1968." Lois Marshall was a graduate of the University of Toronto. Marshall won the coveted Walter W. Naumburg Award in 1952 and made her New York debut on 2 December at Town Hall. In 1968, Marshall was invested as a Companion of the Order of Canada but was, over her long career, the recipient of many other honours and awards, such as the University of Alberta National Award in Music (1962), the Centennial Medal (1967), a Canada Music Council Medal (1972), the Ontario Arts Council Medal of Excellence (1973), the Molson Prize (1980), the Toronto Arts Award for music (1987), a Governor General's Performing Arts Award for Lifetime Artistic Achievement (1993) and the Order of Ontario (1993). She held honorary degrees from the Universities of Toronto and Regina, and the Royal Conservatory made her an honorary fellow in 1994.

== Career ==
She enjoyed a long career, primarily as a concert and recital singer, first as a soprano and later as a mezzo-soprano. She recorded extensively and in a very wide repertoire. Especially prized are the live recordings, which provide something of the vitality and warmth she radiated on those occasions. The lifelong effects of childhood polio severely limited her mobility, especially in later years. Nevertheless, she appeared occasionally on opera stages and in televised opera, including Boston productions especially staged for her by Sarah Caldwell.

In 1961, she was a soloist for the Naumburg Orchestral Concerts, in the Naumburg Bandshell, Central Park, in the summer series.

Her final performances in opera were as the old nurse in Eugene Onegin, in both Ottawa and Toronto. Early fame came with appearances and recordings with Toscanini and Beecham. For many years, she toured as the soprano soloist in the Bach Aria Group, and sang in annual Toronto performances of Messiah and St. Matthew Passion under Sir Ernest MacMillan and successive conductors of the Toronto Symphony.

== Partial discography ==
Dates in parentheses are the dates of recording.

- Arias, CBC PSCD 2001 (1956–1959).
- Bach, Johann Sebastian. Cantata 51 and Wolfgang Amadeus Mozart Exsultate Jubilate, Toronto Symphony, MacMillan (cond.), Hallmark, CS2 (1953/1954).
- Bach, Johann Sebastian. Mass in B Minor, Redel (cond.) Philips 438 739-2.
- Handel, George Frideric. Messiah, Toronto Mendelssohn Choir, MacMillan (cond.), Beaver Records, LPS 001 (1952).
- Bach, Johann Sebastian. St. Matthew Passion, Toronto Symphony, MacMillan (cond.), Beaver Records, LPS 002 (1953).
- Beethoven, Ludwig van. Missa Solemnis, NBC Symphony, Toscanini (cond.), RCA (1953).
- Celebrity Recital, Lois Marshall, Radio Canada International RCI 427 (1974).
- Elwell, Herbert. Pastorale, Toronto Symphony, MacMillan (cond.), Hallmark, CS1 (1953).
- Folksongs of the British Isles, Marquis MAR 102 (1983).
- Handel, George Frideric. Messiah, Toronto Symphony, MacMillan (cond.), Beaver Records, LPS 001 (1952).
- Handel, George Frideric. Solomon, Royal Philharmonic, Beecham (cond.), [EMI] (1955–1956).
- Mozart, Wolfgang Amadeus. Die Entführung aus dem Serail, Royal Philharmonic, Beecham (cond.), EMI (1957).
- Schubert, Franz. Die schöne Müllerin, CBC PSCD 2010 (1976).
- Schubert, Franz. Winterreise, CBC PSCD 2011 (1979).
- Schumann, Robert. A Schumann Recital, CBC (1978).
- Strauss, Richard. Vier letzte Lieder, Sony SM2K 526674.
- Strauss, Richard. "Ophelia Lieder Nos. 1-3" CBC (1962-1963), Richard Strauss - A Personal View, by Glenn Gould

Much of Lois Marshall's recorded legacy is held in the archives of the Canadian Broadcasting Corporation. Little of it, however, has been released.
