= Fantasies, Op. 116 (Brahms) =

Piano cycle composed by Johannes Brahms

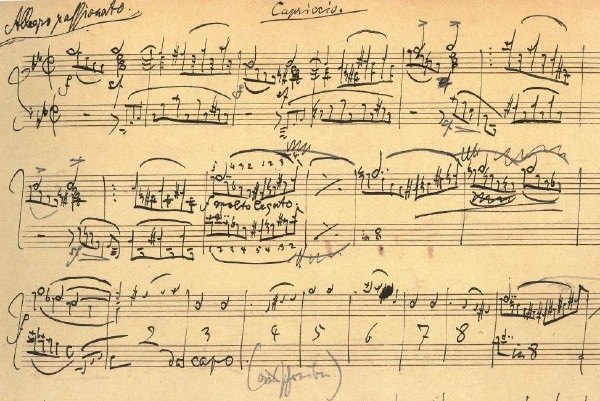
Autograph manuscript of the Capriccio in G minor

The Fantasies (German Fantasien), Op. 116 for solo piano were composed by Johannes Brahms in the Austrian town of Bad Ischl during the summer of 1892. The set consists of seven pieces entitled Capriccio or Intermezzo, though Brahms originally considered using "Notturno" for No. 4 and "Intermezzo" for No. 7. The pieces were published by N. Simrock in December 1892, and represent the end of Brahms's long break from composing piano pieces. The seven movements are:

1. Capriccio in D minor. Presto energico
2. Intermezzo in A minor. Andante
3. Capriccio in G minor. Allegro passionato
4. Intermezzo in E major. Adagio
5. Intermezzo in E minor. Andante con grazia ed intimissimo sentimento
6. Intermezzo in E major. Andantino teneramente
7. Capriccio in D minor. Allegro agitato
